= Aliabad, Kaleybar =

Aliabad علی‌آباد
- Village
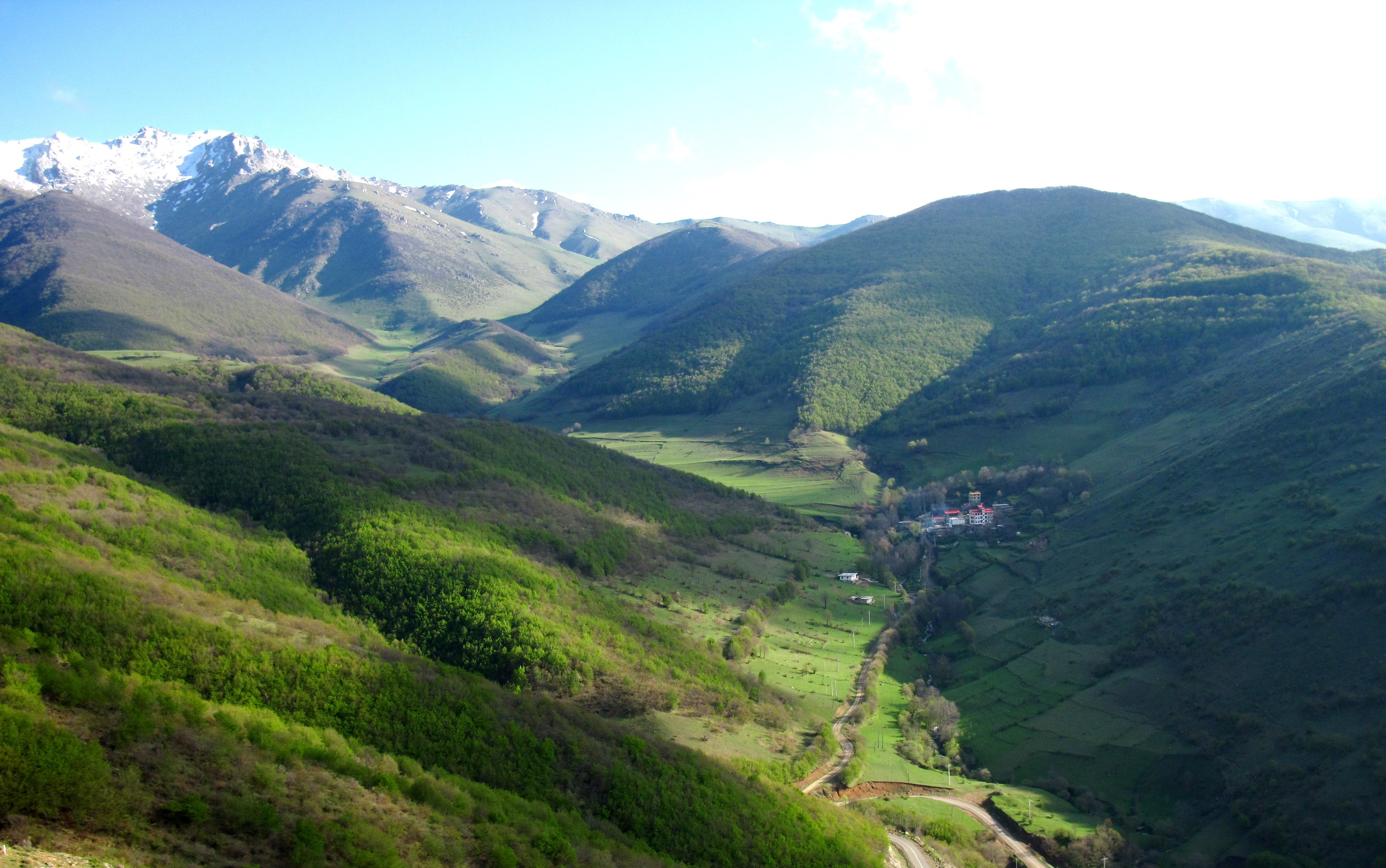
- Village view (2013)

- Location within Iran
- Coordinates: 38°50′40″N 46°55′48″E
- Country: Iran
- Province: East Azerbaijan
- County: Kaleybar
- Bakhsh: Central
- Rural District: Misheh Pareh

Population (2006)
  - Total: 41
- Time zone: UTC+3:30 (IRST)
  - Summer (DST): UTC+4:30 (IRDT)

Aliabad (Persian: علی‌آباد, also Romanized as ‘Alīābād) is a village in Misheh Pareh Rural District, in the Central District of Kaleybar County, East Azerbaijan Province, Iran. At the 2006 census, its population was 41, in 9 families.

== Situation ==
The online edition of the Dehkhoda Dictionary, quoting Iranian Army files, reports a population of 173 people in late 1940s. According to a more recent statistics the population is 35 people in 16 families.

There is a hazelnut forest on the village territory, along the paved road connecting Aghuyeh and Oskelu villages. In addition, a resting area has been built near the village on the Mikandi valley. As a result, Aliabad is one of the most beautiful areas of Arasbaran region.

The grasslands on the village mountains are the summer quarter of Mohammad Khanlu tribe.
