= Mikandi =

Mikandi ميكندي
- Village
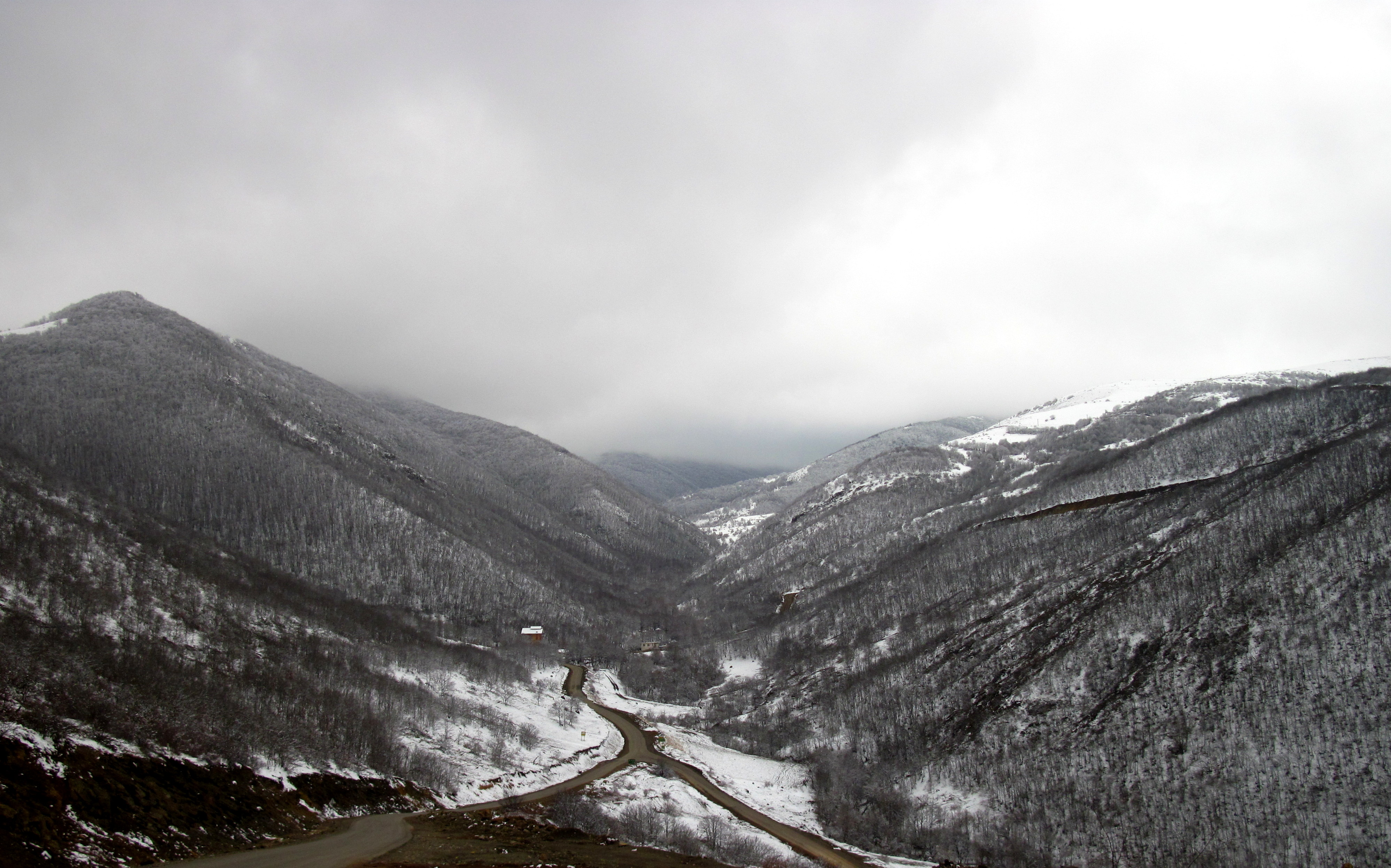
- Mikandi Valley

- Location within Iran
- Coordinates: 38°50′32″N 46°54′20″E
- Country: Iran
- Province: East Azerbaijan
- County: Kaleybar
- Bakhsh: Central
- Rural District: Misheh Pareh

Population (2006)
  - Total: 184
- Time zone: UTC+3:30 (IRST)
  - Summer (DST): UTC+4:30 (IRDT)

Mikandi (Persian: ميكندي, also Romanized as Mīkandī; also known as Makīdī and Myakidi; in Armenian: Միքիդի) is a village in Misheh Pareh Rural District, in the Central District of Kaleybar County, East Azerbaijan Province, Iran. At the 2006 census, its population was 184, in 32 families.

More than half of the population are members of Sarhangzadeh family who had the owned the village before the White Revolution (early 1960s). Due to the ubiquity of nobility, the phrase Landlord of MiKandi is a slang in parts of Arasbaran region, referring to class snobbery. According to the last headman of Mohammad Khanlus, Asadollah Mohammadkhanlu, some inhabitants belong to Mohammad Khanlu tribe.

A patch of forest between Aghaweye and Oskolou includes hazelnut trees. In the past, this unique biosphere provided an important income source for inhabitants. A touristic camp has been built in a valley near Mikandi close to Aghaweye -- Oskolou road.

Historically, Makidi and the surrounding areas were owned by the Armenian Princely family of Meliq-Karagyozians, Lords of Makidi. Many of the Meliq-Karagyozians migrated to the Russian Empire and became entrepreneurs, inter alia owners of the Kapan copper mines.
