= Kardowjin =

Kardowjin كاردوجين
- Village
- Location within Iran
- Coordinates: 38°46′00″N 46°56′13″E
- Country: Iran
- Province: East Azerbaijan
- County: Kaleybar
- Bakhsh: Central
- Rural District: Peyghan Chayi

Population (2006)
  - Total: 28
- Time zone: UTC+3:30 (IRST)
  - Summer (DST): UTC+4:30 (IRDT)

Kardowjin (Persian: كاردوجين, also Romanized as Kārdowjīn; also known as Kārd Chīn, Kārdjīn, Kārdwojīn, Kordejeh, and Kurdadzha) is a village in Peyghan Chayi Rural District, in the Central District of Kaleybar County, East Azerbaijan Province, Iran. At the 2006 census, its population was 28, in 8 families.

== Name ==
According to Vladimir Minorsky, the name of this village is derived from the Mongolian female given name Kardūjin. One prominent historical bearer of this name was the Ilkhanid princess Kurdujin Khatun.
