= Qeran Chay Kandi =

Qeran Chay Kandi قران چاي كندي
- Village
- Location within Iran
- Coordinates: 39°04′06″N 47°12′13″E
- Country: Iran
- Province: East Azerbaijan
- County: Kaleybar
- Bakhsh: Central
- Rural District: Mulan

Population (2006)
  - Total: 112
- Time zone: UTC+3:30 (IRST)
  - Summer (DST): UTC+4:30 (IRDT)

Qeran Chay Kandi (Persian: قران چاي كندي, also Romanized as Qerān Chāy Kandī; also known as Ghāzān Chāy Kandī, Gherān, and Gherān Chāy Kandī) is a village in Mulan Rural District, in the Central District of Kaleybar County, East Azerbaijan Province, Iran. At the 2006 census, its population was 112, in 27 families.
