= Zardughan =

Zardughan زردوغان
- Village
- Location within Iran
- Coordinates: 38°49′00″N 47°06′00″E
- Country: Iran
- Province: East Azerbaijan
- County: Kaleybar
- Bakhsh: Central
- Rural District: Peyghan Chayi

Population (2006)
  - Total: 66
- Time zone: UTC+3:30 (IRST)
  - Summer (DST): UTC+4:30 (IRDT)

Zardughan (Persian: زردوغان, also Romanized as Zardūghān) is a village in Peyghan Chayi Rural District, in the Central District of Kaleybar County, East Azerbaijan Province, Iran. In the 2006 census, its population was 66, in 12 families.
