= Nabi Jan =

Nabi Jan نبي جان
- Village
- Location within Iran
- Coordinates: 38°45′18″N 46°48′11″E
- Country: Iran
- Province: East Azerbaijan
- County: Kaleybar
- Bakhsh: Central
- Rural District: Misheh Pareh

Population (2006)
  - Total: 122
- Time zone: UTC+3:30 (IRST)
  - Summer (DST): UTC+4:30 (IRDT)

Nabi Jan (Persian: نبي جان, also Romanized as Nabī Jān; also known as Nyabidzhan) is a village in Misheh Pareh Rural District, in the Central District of Kaleybar County, East Azerbaijan Province, Iran. At the 2006 census, its population was 122, in 21 families.
