= Kharil =

Kharil خريل
- Village
- Location within Iran
- Coordinates: 38°48′49″N 46°46′19″E
- Country: Iran
- Province: East Azerbaijan
- County: Kaleybar
- Bakhsh: Central
- Rural District: Misheh Pareh

Population (2024)
  - Total: 105
- Time zone: UTC+3:30 (IRST)
  - Summer (DST): UTC+4:30 (IRDT)

Kharil (Persian: خريل, also Romanized as Kharīl and Khoril’; also known as Khowrīl) is a village in Misheh Pareh Rural District, in the Central District of Kaleybar County, East Azerbaijan Province, Iran. At the 2006 census, its population was 96, in 20 families.
