= Owli Qeshlaq =

Owli Qeshlaq اولي قشلاق
- Village
- Location within Iran
- Coordinates: 39°07′30″N 47°11′45″E
- Country: Iran
- Province: East Azerbaijan
- County: Kaleybar
- Bakhsh: Central
- Rural District: Mulan

Population (2006)
  - Total: 242
- Time zone: UTC+3:30 (IRST)
  - Summer (DST): UTC+4:30 (IRDT)

Owli Qeshlaq (Persian: اولي قشلاق, also Romanized as Owlī Qeshlāq) is a village in Mulan Rural District, in the Central District of Kaleybar County, East Azerbaijan Province, Iran. At the 2006 census, its population was 242, in 53 families. The village is populated by the Kurdish Chalabianlu tribe.
