= Shab Khaneh =

Shab Khaneh شبخانه
- Village
- Location within Iran
- Coordinates: 38°52′20″N 46°45′18″E
- Country: Iran
- Province: East Azerbaijan
- County: Kaleybar
- Bakhsh: Central
- Rural District: Misheh Pareh

Population (2006)
  - Total: 48
- Time zone: UTC+3:30 (IRST)
  - Summer (DST): UTC+4:30 (IRDT)

Shab Khaneh (Persian: شبخانه, also Romanized as Shab Khāneh; also known as Shab Khāna and Shebkhane) is a village in Misheh Pareh Rural District, in the Central District of Kaleybar County, East Azerbaijan Province, Iran. At the 2006 census, its population was 48, in 10 families.
