= Mazgar =

Mazgar مزگر
- Village
- Location within Iran
- Coordinates: 38°51′00″N 46°46′00″E
- Country: Iran
- Province: East Azerbaijan
- County: Kaleybar
- Bakhsh: Central
- Rural District: Misheh Pareh

Population (2006)
  - Total: 148
- Time zone: UTC+3:30 (IRST)
  - Summer (DST): UTC+4:30 (IRDT)

Mazgar (Persian: مزگر, also Romanized as Māzgar; also known as Malger, Mesgar, and Misgar) is a village in Misheh Pareh Rural District, in the Central District of Kaleybar County, East Azerbaijan Province, Iran. At the 2006 census, its population was 148, in 22 families.

Mazgar has a significant potential for ecotourism due to its proximity to the pastures of Agdash. In past the location was a transient for migrating nomads of the Mohammad Khanlu tribe.
