= Ferhadlu =

Ferhadlu فرهادلو
- Village
- Location within Iran
- Coordinates: 39°08′13″N 47°09′04″E
- Country: Iran
- Province: East Azerbaijan
- County: Kaleybar
- Bakhsh: Central
- Rural District: Mulan

Population (2006)
  - Total: 36
- Time zone: UTC+3:30 (IRST)
  - Summer (DST): UTC+4:30 (IRDT)

Ferhadlu (Persian: فرهادلو, also Romanized as Ferhādlū) is a village in Mulan Rural District, in the Central District of Kaleybar County, East Azerbaijan Province, Iran. At the 2006 census, its population was 36, in 9 families. The village is populated by the Kurdish Chalabianlu tribe.
