= Bali Beyglu =

Bali Beyglu بالي بيگ لو
- Village
- Location within Iran
- Coordinates: 39°09′27″N 47°13′58″E
- Country: Iran
- Province: East Azerbaijan
- County: Kaleybar
- Bakhsh: Central
- Rural District: Mulan

Population (2006)
  - Total: 82
- Time zone: UTC+3:30 (IRST)
  - Summer (DST): UTC+4:30 (IRDT)

Bali Beyglu (Persian: بالي بيگ لو, also Romanized as Bālī Beyglū; also known as Bālā Beyglū) is a village in Mulan Rural District, in the Central District of Kaleybar County, East Azerbaijan Province, Iran. At the 2006 census, its population was 82, in 14 families. The village is populated by the Kurdish Chalabianlu tribe.
