= Anbastaq =

Anbastaq انباستق
- Village
- Location within Iran
- Coordinates: 38°43′07″N 47°12′34″E
- Country: Iran
- Province: East Azerbaijan
- County: Kaleybar
- Bakhsh: Central
- Rural District: Peyghan Chayi

Population (2006)
  - Total: 230
- Time zone: UTC+3:30 (IRST)
  - Summer (DST): UTC+4:30 (IRDT)

Anbastaq (Persian: انباستق, also Romanized as Anbāstaq; also known as Amasti, Anbastīq, and Anbatīq) is a village in Peyghan Chayi Rural District, in the Central District of Kaleybar County, East Azerbaijan Province, Iran. At the 2006 census, its population was 230, in 46 families.
