= Shekar Ali Kandi =

Shekar Ali Kandi شكرعلي كندي
- Village
- Location within Iran
- Coordinates: 38°44′34″N 47°11′02″E
- Country: Iran
- Province: East Azerbaijan
- County: Kaleybar
- Bakhsh: Central
- Rural District: Peyghan Chayi

Population (2006)
  - Total: 99
- Time zone: UTC+3:30 (IRST)
  - Summer (DST): UTC+4:30 (IRDT)

Shekar Ali Kandi (Persian: شكرعلي كندي, also Romanized as Shekar ‘Alī Kandī; also known as Shekar ‘Alī Qeshlāqī) is a village in Peyghan Chayi Rural District, in the Central District of Kaleybar County, East Azerbaijan Province, Iran. At the 2006 census, its population was 99, in 20 families.
