= Babaylu =

Babaylu بابايلو
- Village
- Location within Iran
- Coordinates: 39°00′49″N 47°08′24″E
- Country: Iran
- Province: East Azerbaijan
- County: Kaleybar
- Bakhsh: Central
- Rural District: Mulan

Population (2006)
  - Total: 61
- Time zone: UTC+3:30 (IRST)
  - Summer (DST): UTC+4:30 (IRDT)

Babaylu (Persian: بابايلو, also Romanized as Bābāylū) is a village in Mulan Rural District, in the Central District of Kaleybar County, East Azerbaijan Province, Iran. At the 2006 census, its population was 61, in 15 families.
