= Lamhuni =

Lamhuni لمهوني
- Village
- Location within Iran
- Coordinates: 39°03′53″N 47°08′20″E
- Country: Iran
- Province: East Azerbaijan
- County: Kaleybar
- Bakhsh: Central
- Rural District: Mulan

Population (2006)
  - Total: 18
- Time zone: UTC+3:30 (IRST)
  - Summer (DST): UTC+4:30 (IRDT)

Lamhuni (Persian: لمهوني, also Romanized as Lamhūnī; also known as Lūmhūnī) is a village in Mulan Rural District, in the Central District of Kaleybar County, East Azerbaijan Province, Iran. At the 2006 census, its population was 18, in 6 families.
