= Qeshlaq-e Kaleybar =

Qeshlaq-e Kaleybar قشلاق كليبر
- Village
- Country: Iran
- Province: East Azerbaijan
- County: Kaleybar
- Bakhsh: Central
- Rural District: Peyghan Chayi

Population (2006)
  - Total: 88
- Time zone: UTC+3:30 (IRST)
  - Summer (DST): UTC+4:30 (IRDT)

Qeshlaq-e Kaleybar (Persian: قشلاق كليبر, also Romanized as Qeshlāq-e Kaleybar) is a village in Peyghan Chayi Rural District, in the Central District of Kaleybar County, East Azerbaijan Province, Iran. At the 2006 census, its population was 88, in 17 families.
