= Saramlu =

Saramlu سراملو
- Village
- Location within Iran
- Coordinates: 39°08′59″N 47°08′43″E
- Country: Iran
- Province: East Azerbaijan
- County: Kaleybar
- Bakhsh: Central
- Rural District: Mulan

Population (2006)
  - Total: 156
- Time zone: UTC+3:30 (IRST)
  - Summer (DST): UTC+4:30 (IRDT)

Saramlu (Persian: سراملو, also Romanized as Sarāmlū; also known as Sīrāmlū) is a village in Mulan Rural District, in the Central District of Kaleybar County, East Azerbaijan Province, Iran. At the 2006 census, its population was 156, in 28 families. The village is populated by the Kurdish Chalabianlu tribe.
