= Kaleybar =

City in East Azerbaijan province, Iran

Kaleybar Persian: كليبر
- City
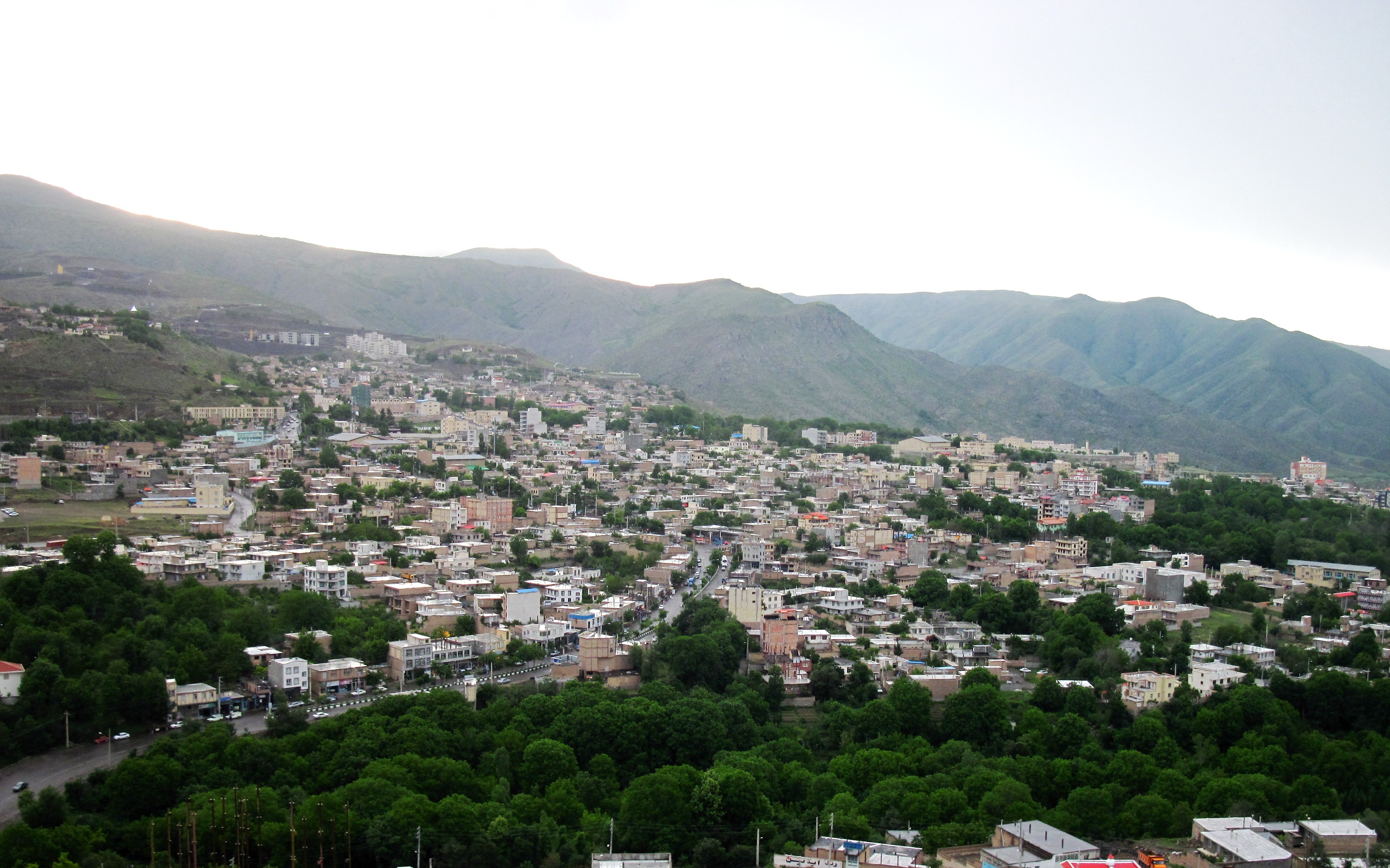
- Kaleybar in May 2013

- Location within Iran
- Coordinates: 38°51′59″N 47°02′26″E
- Country: Iran
- Province: East Azerbaijan
- County: Kaleybar
- District: Central

Population (2016)
  - Total: 9,324
- Time zone: UTC+3:30 (IRST)

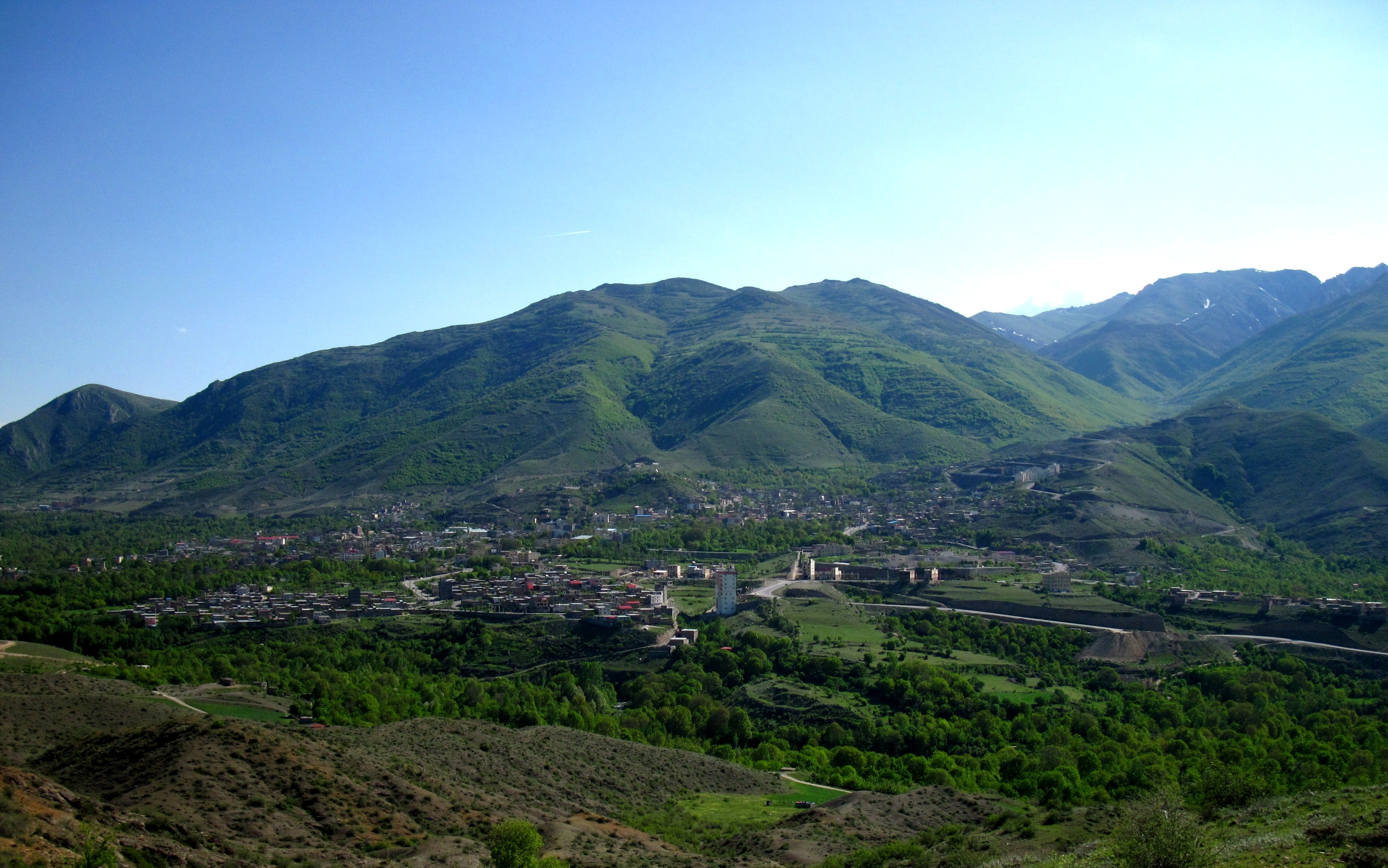
Kaleybar, 30 April 2013

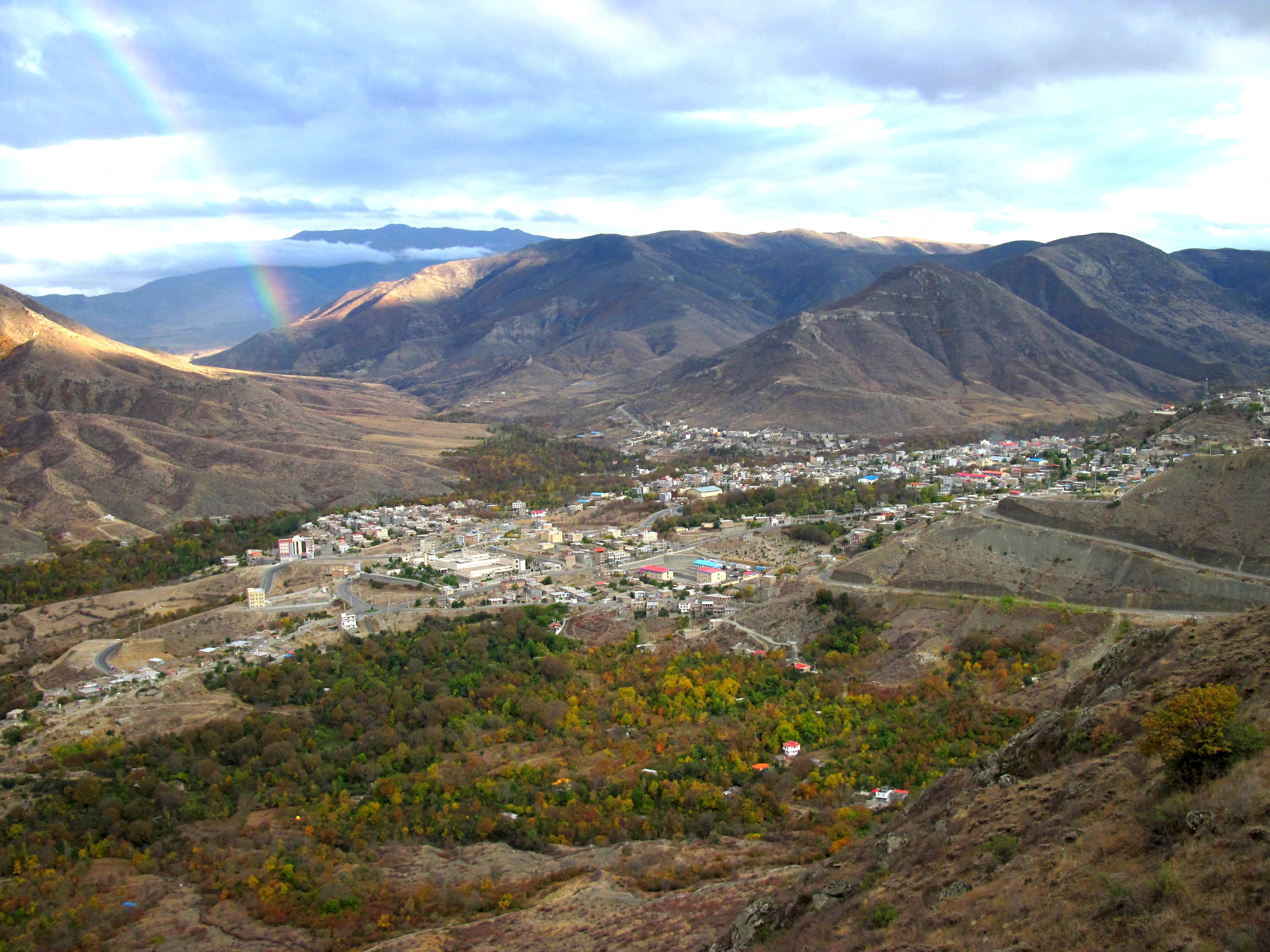
Kaleybar in fall

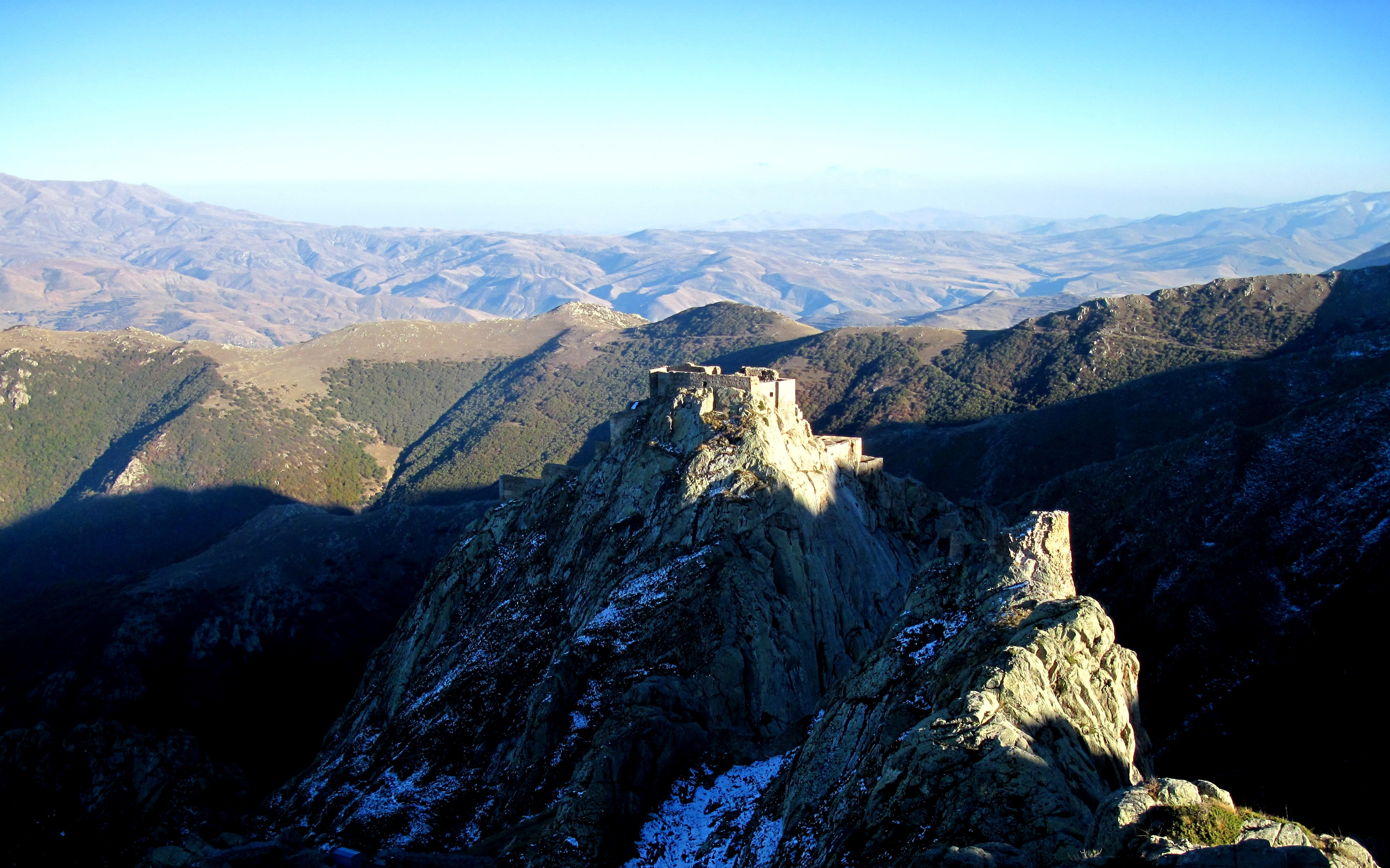
Surrounding mountains, October 2013

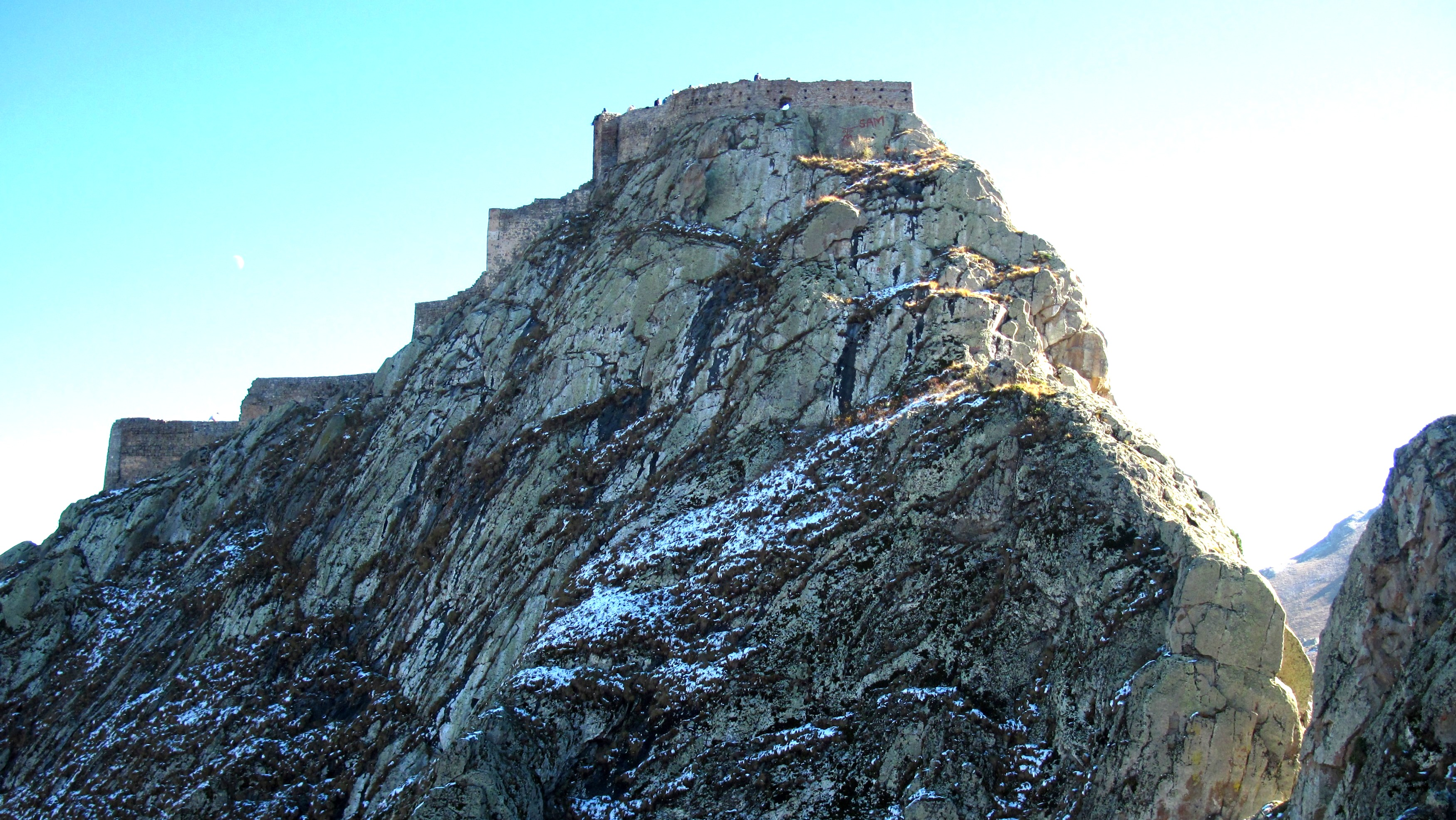
Babak Castle, a touristic site near Kaleybar

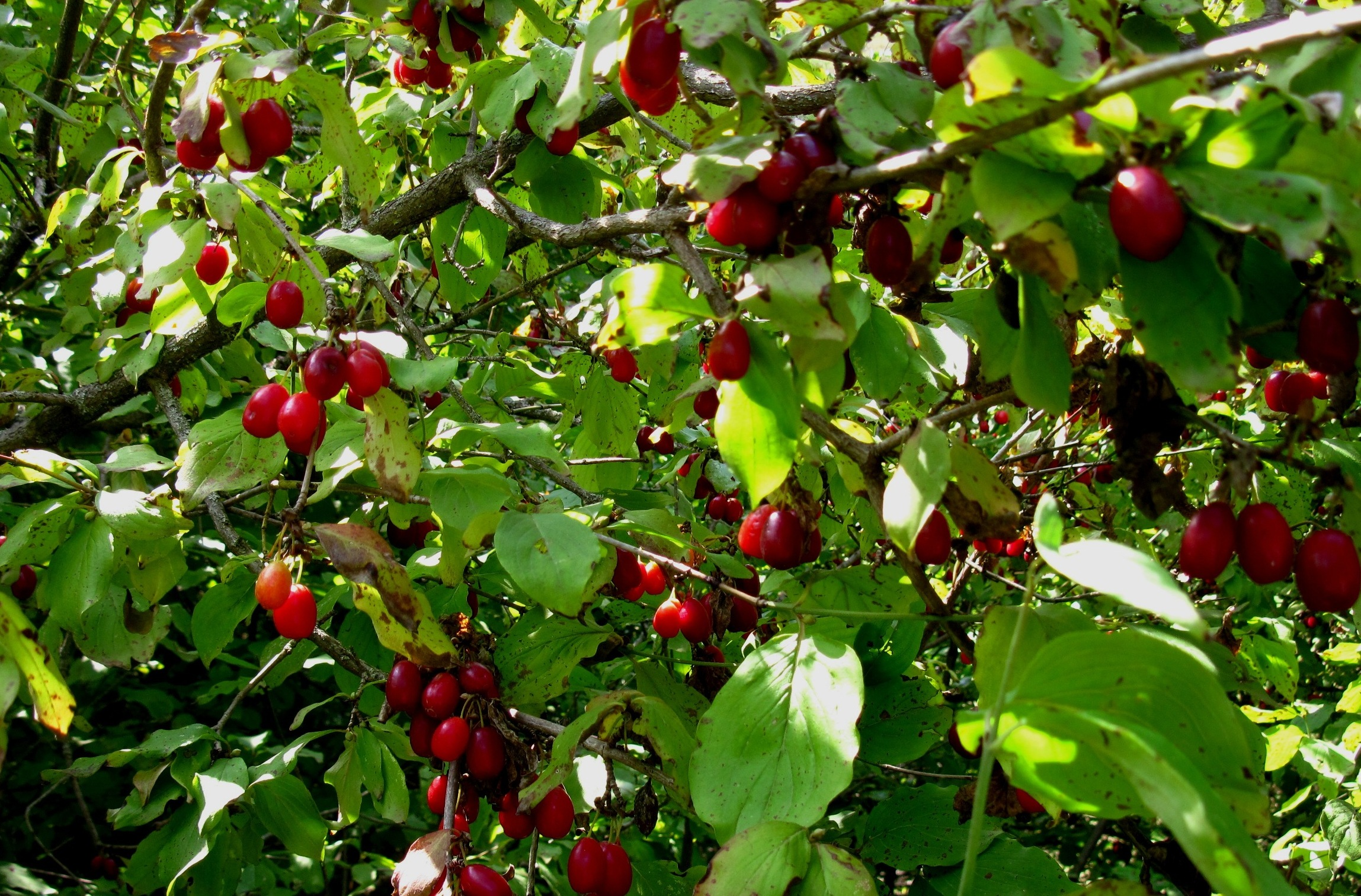
Cornus mas fruit

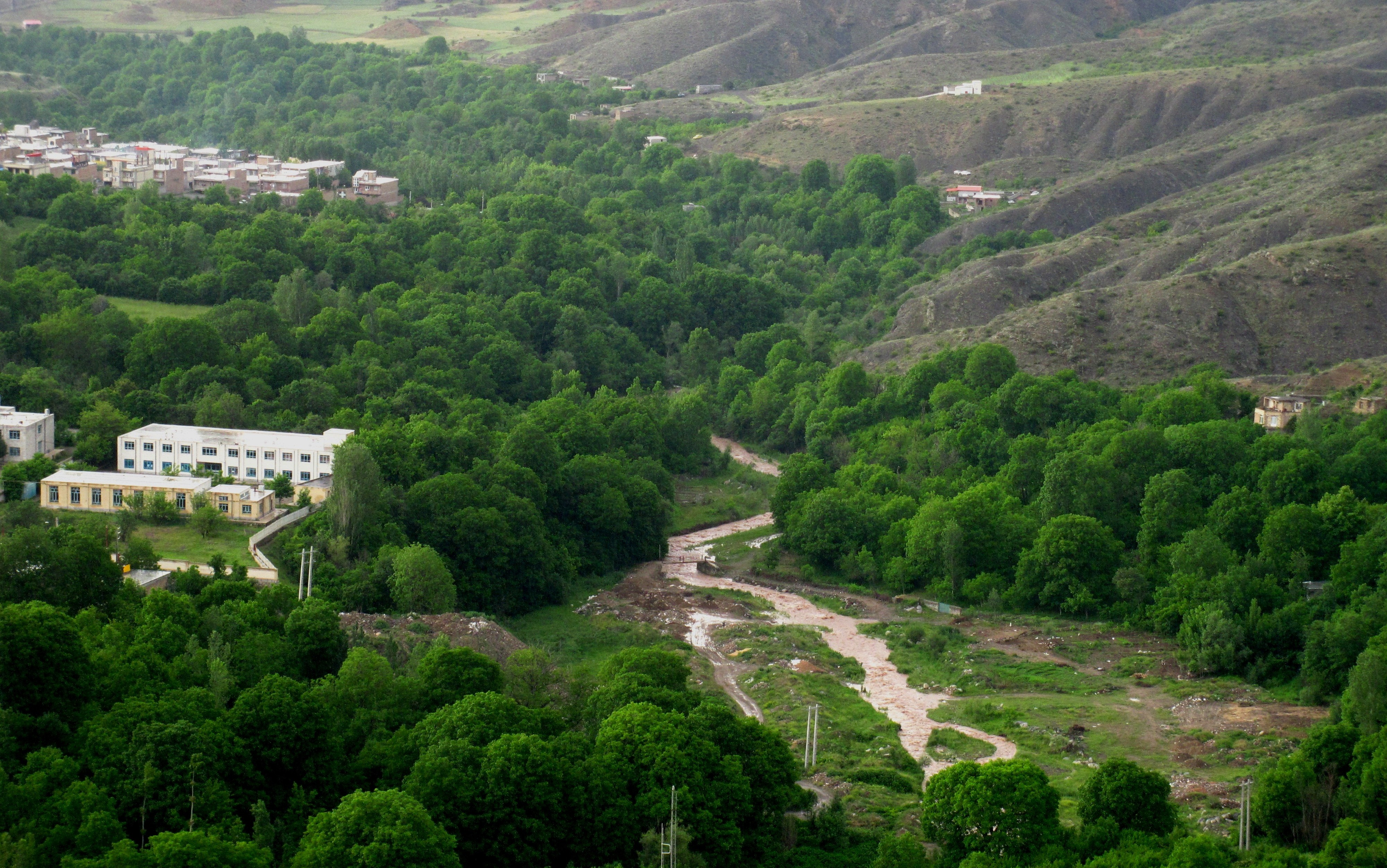
Kaleybar river irrigates the "Cornus mas" orchards

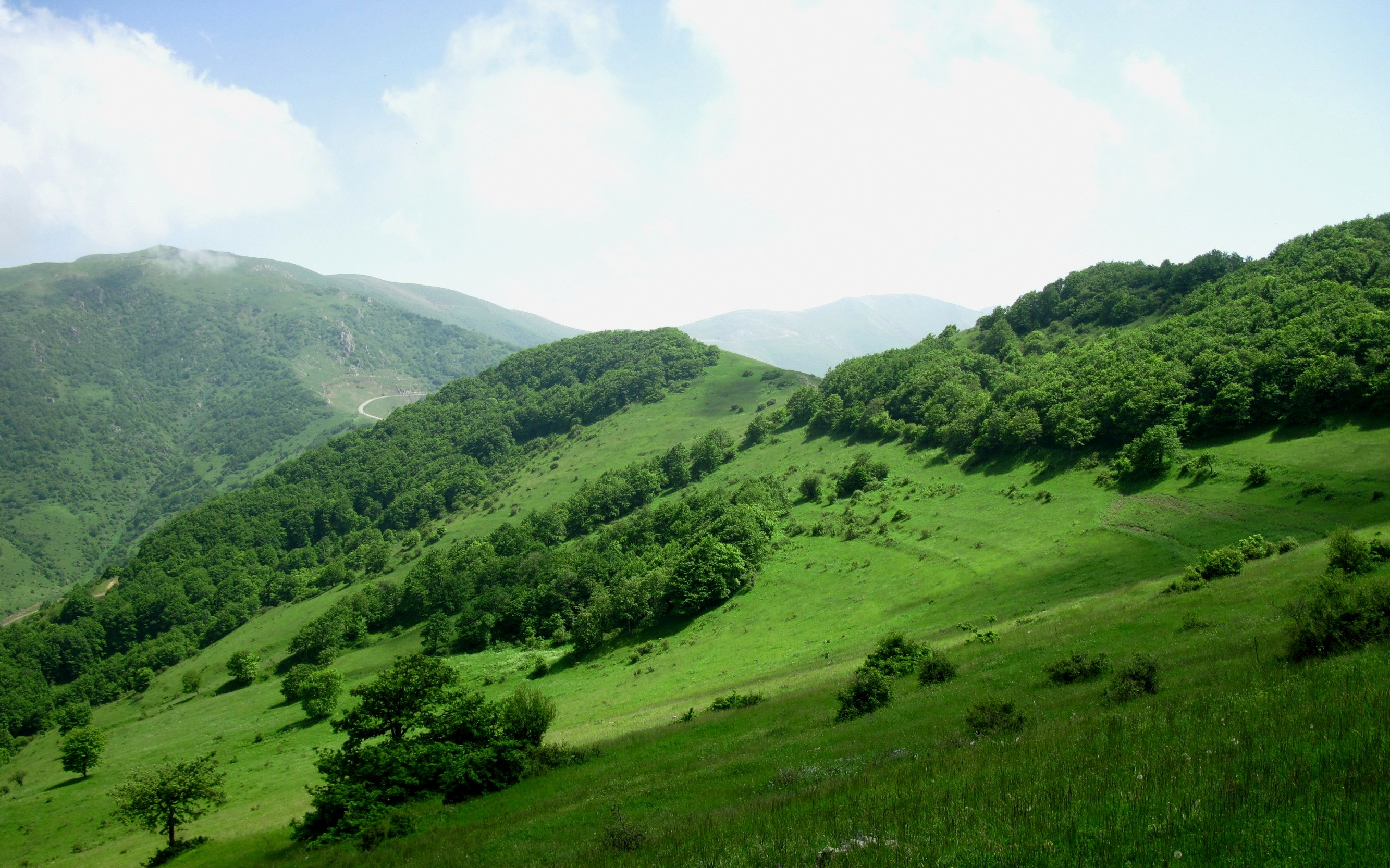
Aqdash summer camp within a driving distance of Kaleybar

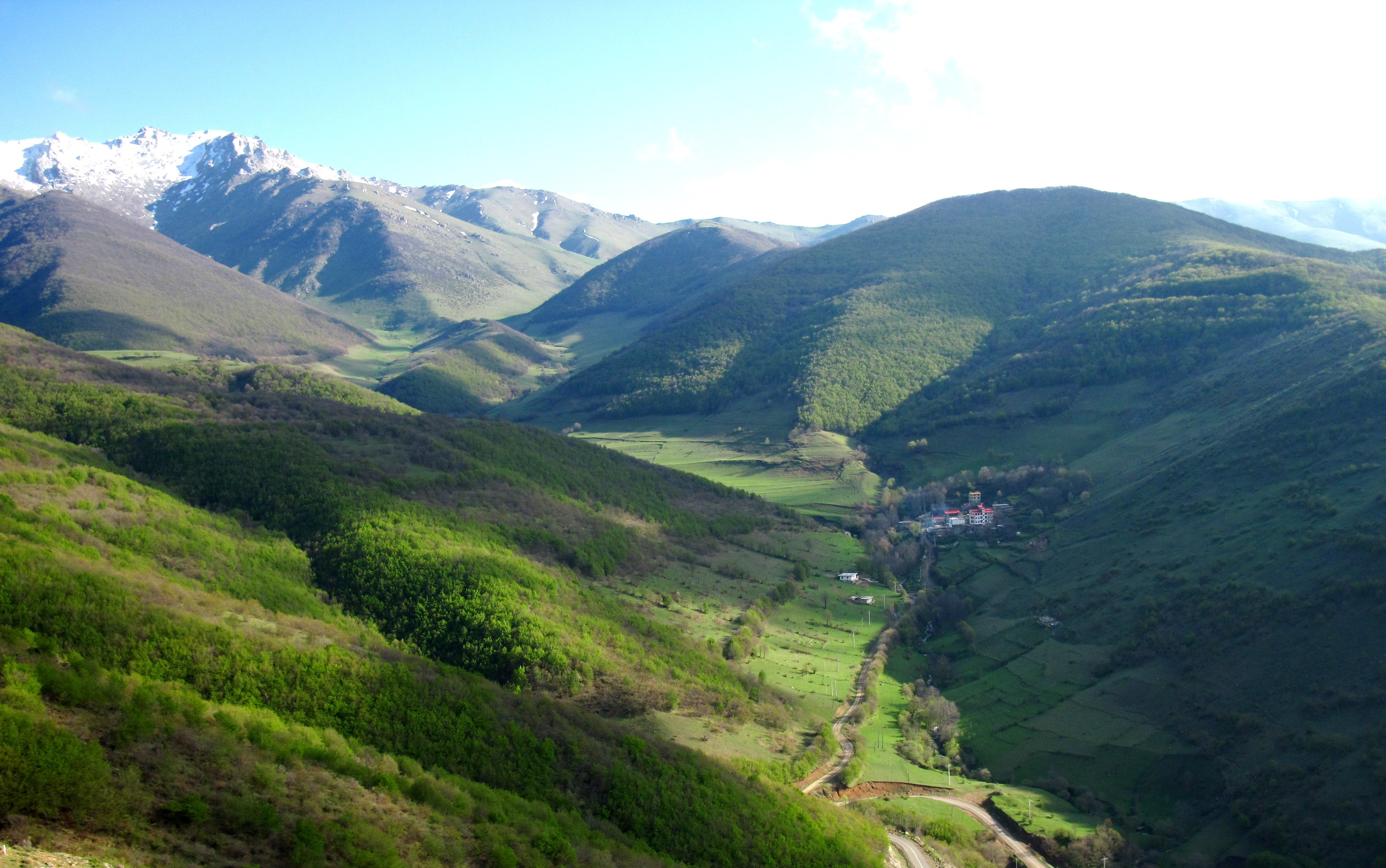
Aliabad village

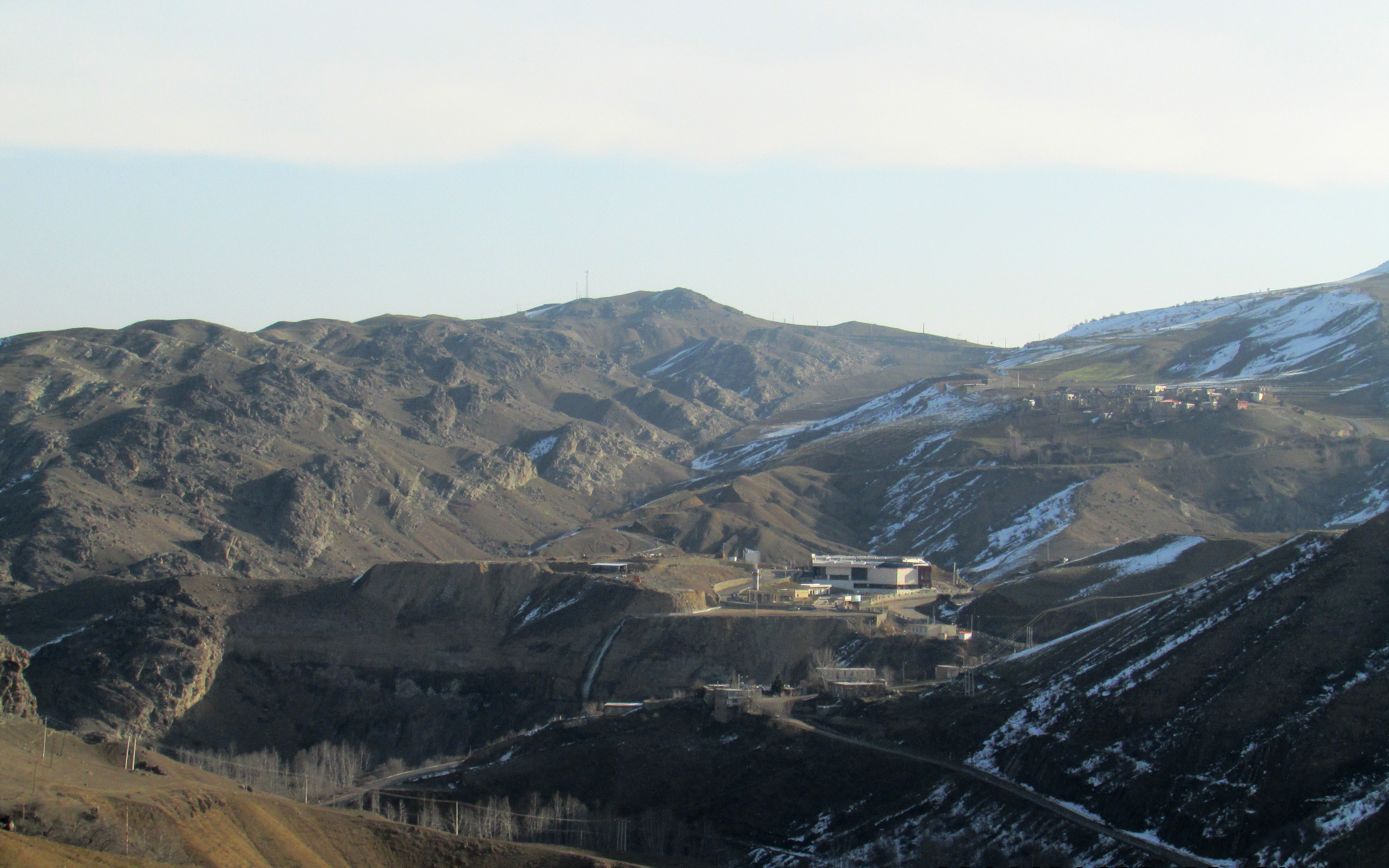
Motaalleq Hot spring therapeutic facility

Kaleybar (Azerbaijani and Persian: كليبر) (Note: Also romanized as Keleibar, Keleivar, Kalībar, and Kalipar) is a city in the Central District of Kaleybar County, East Azerbaijan province, Iran, serving as capital of both the county and the district.

In recent years, the city has become a tourist destination due to its proximity to Babak Castle. In addition, as a result of geopolitical developments Kaleybar is gradually replacing Ahar as the capital city of Qareh Dagh region.

== History ==
Kaleybar, known as Bâdd or Bâddayn (or Bâdhdh) in Islamic chronicles, was the stronghold of Babak Khorramdin who, in 816 AD, revolted against the Islamic Abbasid Caliphate. Bâbak's resistance was ended in 836 when he was defeated by the Iranian general Afshin, acting on behalf of the Caliphate. The two decades of tumultuous events subjected the town to the reports of early Islamic historians.

The first reference to Kaleybar has been by Al-Masudi in The Meadows of Gold, Bâbak revolted in Bâdh region with the disciples of Jâvidân ... Following a series of defeats Bâbak was blockaded in his native town..., which even now is known as Babak's country.

Ibn Athir in his book, The Complete History, has devoted many pages to the description of battles which took place in Kaleybar between the Armies of Caliphate and Bâbak's forces.

Yaqut al-Hamawi, writing in early thirteenth century, describes Kaleybar as the following, County between Azerbaijan and Arân. This is where Bâbak resisted when he rebelled against the Abbasid caliph Mu'tasim. We know these verses Buhturi

God protects you, great warrior who, in the days of Bâbak, have reversed the doors of the ungodly;

It is you who have taken their city Bâdh that you covered the shamelessness in it.

At the bottom, flows a large river which has the property of curing the most inveterate fevers. The Araxes river flows on the border. This county produces pomegranates, figs, and grapes that are dried on fires (because the sun is always obscured by thick clouds).

Hamdallah Mustawfi, writing in the mid-14 century, mentions Kaleybar as, A village of Azerbaijan, in the woods near a mountain which comprises a fortress. Below flows a river. The country produces wheat and fruit, and its inhabitants, who are Turks or Mongols, follow the rite of Schafey.

Kaleybar, perhaps, suffered enormously during Russo-Persian War (1804–13) and Russo-Persian War (1826–28) due to its proximity to the war zone. Moreover, through the involvement of Arasbaran tribes in armed conflicts during the Persian Constitutional Revolution, Kaleybar should have experienced a tumultuous period. The period has been described in the following books, which are dedicated to the contemporary history of Arasbaran region.

- H. Bayburdi "The history of Arasbaran",
- H. Doosti, "The history and geography of Arasbaran",
- N. Sedqi, "The contemporary political and social history of Arasbaran",
- S.R. Alemohammad, "The book of Arasbaran".
- "The Tribes of Qarāca Dāġ: A Brief History" by P. Oberling.

== Demographics ==
=== Language ===
The spoken language in Kaleybar is Azerbaijani, a Turkic language. Some neighboring villageslike Chaykandi, Kelasor, Khuynarud, Arazin, still speak the area's original language of Tati, an Iranic language, there is no evidence that Tati was ever spoken in Kaleybar. A cleric, the late Haji Mohammad Zakeri, told that the name Kaleybar was indeed a Tati word, meaning a town built on rocks.

=== Religion ===
The dominant religion is Shia Islam. However, followers of Yârsân or Ahl-e Haqq constitute an appreciable minority in the town and the surrounding villages. Dr. Mohamad Ali, the only physician of the town until the 1970s, was a member of the Baháʼí Faith.

=== Population ===
At the time of the 2006 National Census, the city's population was 9,030 in 2,397 households. The following census in 2011 counted 9,887 people in 2,687 households. The 2016 census measured the population of the city as 9,324 people in 2,880 households. Kaleybar is the 25th most populous city of the province.

== Climate ==
In Köppen climate classification, Kaleybar's climate is transitional between mediterranean(Csa) and humid subtropical (Cfa) because of receiving little precipitation in August. The weather is cold in winters and relatively hot in summers. Most of the precipitation falls in spring months.

Climate data for Kaleybar (1999-2010 normals)
Month	Jan	Feb	Mar	Apr	May	Jun	Jul	Aug	Sep	Oct	Nov	Dec	Year
Mean daily maximum °C (°F)	5.7 (42.3)	7.5 (45.5)	11.7 (53.1)	14.8 (58.6)	19.7 (67.5)	25.2 (77.4)	28.0 (82.4)	28.1 (82.6)	22.9 (73.2)	17.4 (63.3)	11.9 (53.4)	7.9 (46.2)	16.7 (62.1)
Daily mean °C (°F)	1.9 (35.4)	3.7 (38.7)	7.3 (45.1)	10.6 (51.1)	15.1 (59.2)	20.0 (68.0)	22.8 (73.0)	22.9 (73.2)	18.6 (65.5)	13.5 (56.3)	8.0 (46.4)	4.3 (39.7)	12.4 (54.3)
Mean daily minimum °C (°F)	−2.0 (28.4)	−0.2 (31.6)	2.9 (37.2)	6.4 (43.5)	10.6 (51.1)	14.8 (58.6)	17.6 (63.7)	17.7 (63.9)	14.2 (57.6)	9.6 (49.3)	4.2 (39.6)	0.6 (33.1)	8.0 (46.5)
Average precipitation mm (inches)	20.5 (0.81)	26.6 (1.05)	41.9 (1.65)	69.6 (2.74)	69.5 (2.74)	28.8 (1.13)	21.4 (0.84)	9.5 (0.37)	21.3 (0.84)	28.3 (1.11)	29.6 (1.17)	19.8 (0.78)	386.8 (15.23)
Average relative humidity (%)	59	60	60	68	67	57	52	53	65	69	62	58	61
Average dew point °C (°F)	−5.9 (21.4)	−4.7 (23.5)	−1.8 (28.8)	3.6 (38.5)	8.0 (46.4)	10.2 (50.4)	11.5 (52.7)	12.3 (54.1)	10.6 (51.1)	6.1 (43.0)	−0.1 (31.8)	−4.3 (24.3)	3.8 (38.8)
Source: IRIMO (temperatures) (precipitation)(humidity)(dew point 1999-2005)

== Culture ==
Rezā Shāh, who replaced the last Qajar king Ahmad Shah Qajar in 1925 and founded the Pahlavi dynasty, insisted on ethnic nationalism and cultural Unitarianism and implemented his policies with forced sedentarization of nomadic tribes. He renamed Qaradağ as Arasbaran to deny the Turkic identity of the inhabitants. In recent years, as a reaction to this oppressive acts, there has been an identity-seeking movement which emphasizes the heroic resistance of Babak. In 1998-2006 period Babak Castle considered a shrine for the movement and many cultural events were organized near Kaleybar.

=== Melodic whistling ===
Kaleybar region with mountainous terrain, shepherding and cultivation of hillside possess the isolating features for the development of a sophisticated whistled language. The majority of males are able, and perhaps addicted, to masterfully mimic the melodic sounds of musical instruments using fingerless whistle. Melodic whistling, indeed, appears to be a private version of the Ashug music for personal satisfaction.

=== Ashugh music ===
The mountainous region of Qaradağ, due to its remoteness and inaccessibility, was a guardian of Ashugh music. This frequent allusions of this music to mountains, with the intention of arousing an emotional state with a tone of mild melancholy, is consistent with the geography of Kaleybar. The first verses of an Ashugh song, composed by Məhəmməd Araz, may represent the essence of Ashugh music:

Bəlkə bu yerlərə birdə gəlmədim (I may not come to these places again)

duman səlamət qal dağ səlamət qal (Farewell to the Mist and to the mountain)

arxamca su səpir göydə bulutlar (Behind me the clouds sprinkle drops of rain)

leysan səlamət qal yağ səlamət qal (Farewell to summer days, farewell to the rain)

Aşıq Hoseyn Javan, born in Oti Kandi near Kaleybar, is the legendary Ashik who was exiled to Soviet Union due to his revolutionary songs during the brief reign of Azerbaijan People's Government following the World War II. Hoseyn Javan's music, in contrast to the contemporary poetry in Iran, emphasizes on realism and beauties of real life in line with the mainstream world view of Arasbaran culture.

== Potential for tourism ==
James Morier, the author of The Adventures of Hajji Baba of Ispahan, travelling through Kaleybar in early 19th century described the city in the following words, "Kaleybar... was formerly a considerable place. Its extensive gardens have become a forest of fruit-trees, where the walnuts grow to an immense size..." More recently, Jamie Maslin, a Canadian traveler wrote that Kaleybar " ... was surrounded by steep green mountains, the peaks of which remained unseen, shrouded in a slowly drifting mountain mist. It was a great location and once again so very different from most people's perception of Iran - not dry and parched like its central deserts, but as lush and green as merry old mother England."

=== Zoğal Festival ===
The micro-climate, generated by the surrounding mountains, is particularly suited for the production of zoğal (Cornus mas, Persian: زغال اخته, Azeri language:Kızılcık). The berries, which ripen in mid to late summer, are sold in numerous small shops alongside the Shahid Ansari Street. The surplus berries are sun-dried on flat roof tops and sold to the market as an ingredient of Erişte Aşı (Persian: آش رشته).

In recent years, the local government has organized Zoğal festivals as a means of promoting tourism.

=== Bâbak Castle ===
The relatively well preserved Babak Castle at an altitude of 2300 m is located is located some 3 km of the town. This Sasanid era fortress is named after the ninth century Iranian resistance leader, Babak Khorramdin., who resisted Arab armies until year 839.

=== Summer camp of Arasbaran tribes ===
The mountain ranges southwest of Kaleybar are still used as summer camp of pastoralists belonging to Arasbaran Tribes. This provides an opportunity for observing the relaxed idyllic life style of bygone times. Pastoralists, despite their simple life style during summer months, are often well-educated folks and own modern dwelling in their winter quarters. They, generally, welcome visitors as long as their cultures and mode of life is not ridiculed. The visit should be made on sunny days when the shepherd dogs feel lethargic. During foggy days and between dusk and down dogs regain their vicious character; strangers have to avoid crossing campsite otherwise the attacking dogs cannot be controlled even by their owners. Fending off the dogs by beating is considered an act of aggression towards the owner and should be avoided.

== See also ==
Media related to Kaleybar at Wikimedia Commons

Kaleybar travel guide from Wikivoyage
