= Armanian =

Armanian ارمنيان
- Village
- Location within Iran
- Coordinates: 38°43′25″N 47°06′05″E
- Country: Iran
- Province: East Azerbaijan
- County: Kaleybar
- Bakhsh: Central
- Rural District: Peyghan Chayi

Population (2006)
  - Total: 59
- Time zone: UTC+3:30 (IRST)
  - Summer (DST): UTC+4:30 (IRDT)

Armanian (Persian: ارمنيان, also Romanized as Armanīān; also known as Ermashan) is a village in Peyghan Chayi Rural District, in the Central District of Kaleybar County, East Azerbaijan Province, Iran. At the 2006 census, its population was 59, in 18 families.
