= Kalalaq =

Village in East Azerbaijan province, Iran

Kalalaq Persian: كلالق
- Village
- Location within Iran
- Coordinates: 38°49′16″N 47°03′37″E
- Country: Iran
- Province: East Azerbaijan
- County: Kaleybar
- District: Central
- Rural District: Peyghan Chayi

Population (2016)
  - Total: 413
- Time zone: UTC+3:30 (IRST)

Kalalaq (Persian: كلالق) (Note: Also romanized as Kalālaq; also known as Kalalagh and Kalāleh) is a village in Peyghan Chayi Rural District of the Central District in Kaleybar County, East Azerbaijan province, Iran.

== Demographics ==
=== Population ===
At the time of the 2006 National Census, the village's population was 512 in 107 households. The following census in 2011 counted 476 people in 126 households. The 2016 census measured the population of the village as 413 people in 122 households.
