= Marzrud, East Azerbaijan =

Village in East Azerbaijan province, Iran

Marzrud Persian: مرزرود
- Village
- Location within Iran
- Coordinates: 38°47′38″N 46°53′48″E
- Country: Iran
- Province: East Azerbaijan
- County: Kaleybar
- District: Central
- Rural District: Misheh Pareh

Population (2016)
  - Total: 214
- Time zone: UTC+3:30 (IRST)

Marzrud (Persian: مرزرود) (Note: Also romanized as Marz Rood, Marz Rūd, and Marzrūd; also known as Marzru) is a village in Misheh Pareh Rural District of the Central District in Kaleybar County, East Azerbaijan province, Iran.

== Demographics ==
=== Population ===
At the time of the 2006 National Census, the village's population was 184 in 50 households. The following census in 2011 counted 205 people in 58 households. The 2016 census measured the population of the village as 214 people in 74 households.

In the past, the pastures of Marzrud were the summer quarter of the Mohammad Khanlu tribe.
