= Balan, Kaleybar =

Balan بالان
- Village
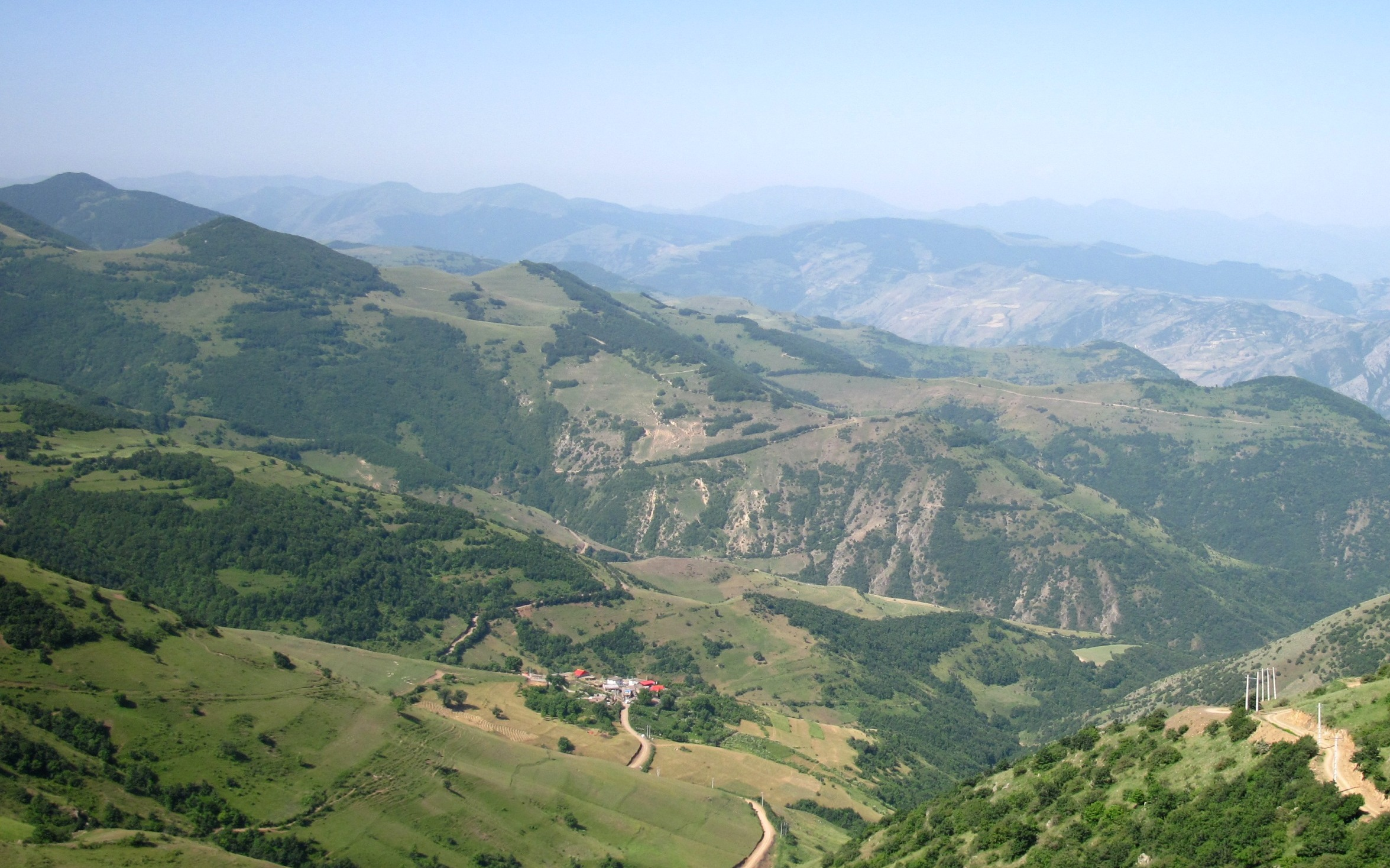
- Balan July 2011

- Location within Iran
- Coordinates: 38°52′32″N 46°48′26″E
- Country: Iran
- Province: East Azerbaijan
- County: Kaleybar
- Bakhsh: Central
- Rural District: Misheh Pareh

Population (2006)
  - Total: 90
- Time zone: UTC+3:30 (IRST)
  - Summer (DST): UTC+4:30 (IRDT)

Balan (Persian: بالان, also Romanized as Bālān) is a village in Misheh Pareh Rural District, in the Central District of Kaleybar County, East Azerbaijan Province, Iran. At the 2006 census, its population was 90, in 11 families.

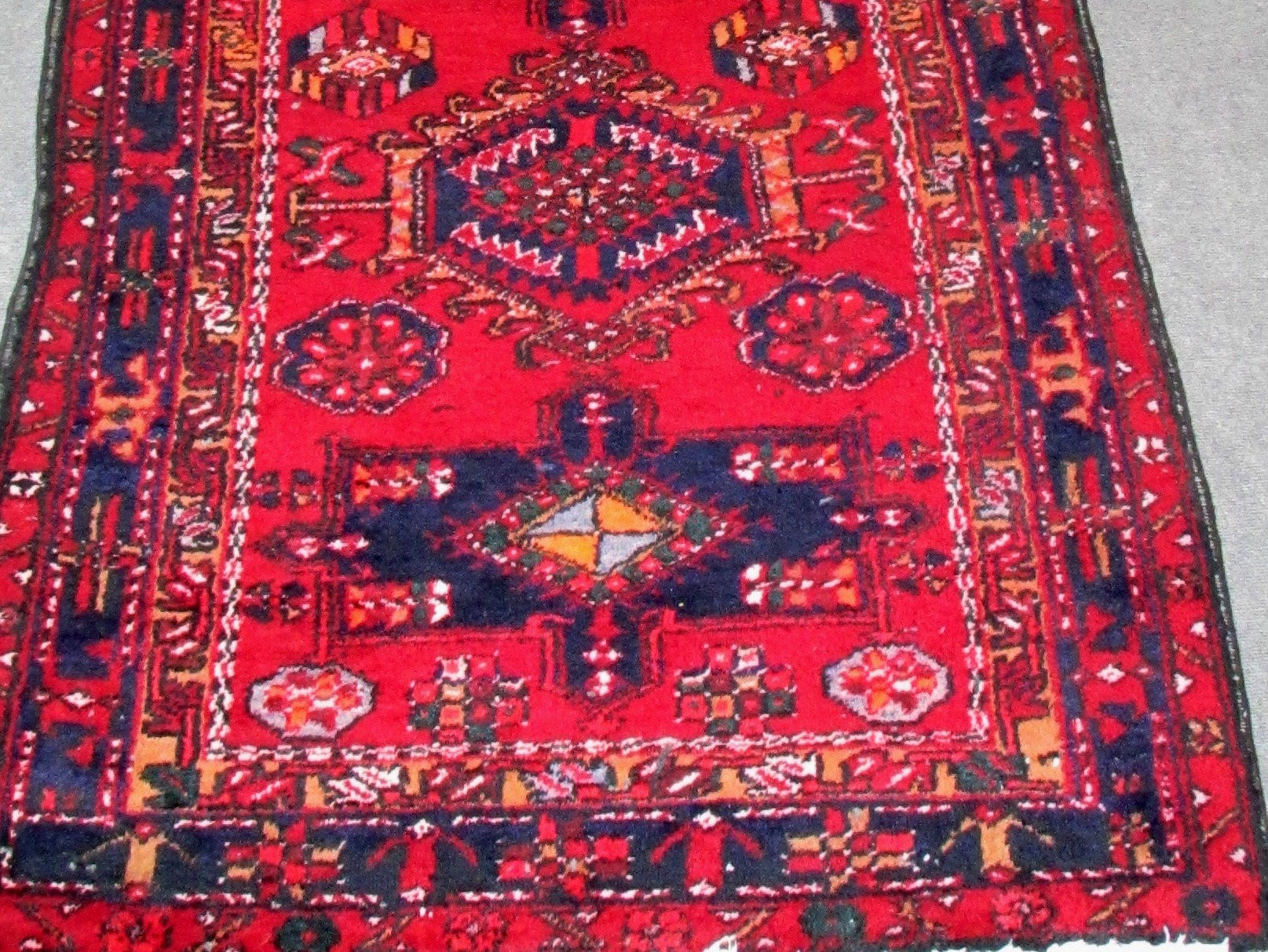
Balan Rug.

Balan was famous for the quality of the carpets which were woven there. These carpets, known as Balan Rug, had a size of approximately 1x4 m^{2} and a characteristic pattern. The village also produced turnips prized in surrounding villages for its taste.

Balan has a significant potential for ecotourism due to its proximity to the pastures of Agdash. In past the location was a transient for migrating nomads of Mohammad Khanlu tribe. Early in May, the tribes would halt there for a few days before leaving for their summer quarters. Nowadays, the number of nomads have dwindled, still few nomadic families occasionally pitch their tents on the hill-tops.
