= Hasanbeyglu =

Hasanbeyglu (Azerbaijani: حسنبیگلو) is one of the six major Tribes of Arasbaran. It is a Turkic tribe dwelling in the Arasbaran region in East Azerbaijan Province of Iran. Its summer quarters were in the western part of Misheh Pareh Rural District and its winter quarters were in the northern part of Dizmar-e Gharbi Rural District. At present the tribe is in most part sedentary, with majority of families living in suburbs of Tehran.

The last headman of the tribe was Mostafa Khan Ahmadi. Three generation of Mirahmadi family from Hasanbeyglu tribe have been significant political players in local and national levels since Constitutional Revolution of early twentieth century.
