= Nowjeh Deh-e Olya =

Village in East Azerbaijan province, Iran

Nowjeh Deh-e Olya Persian: نوجه ده عليا
- Village
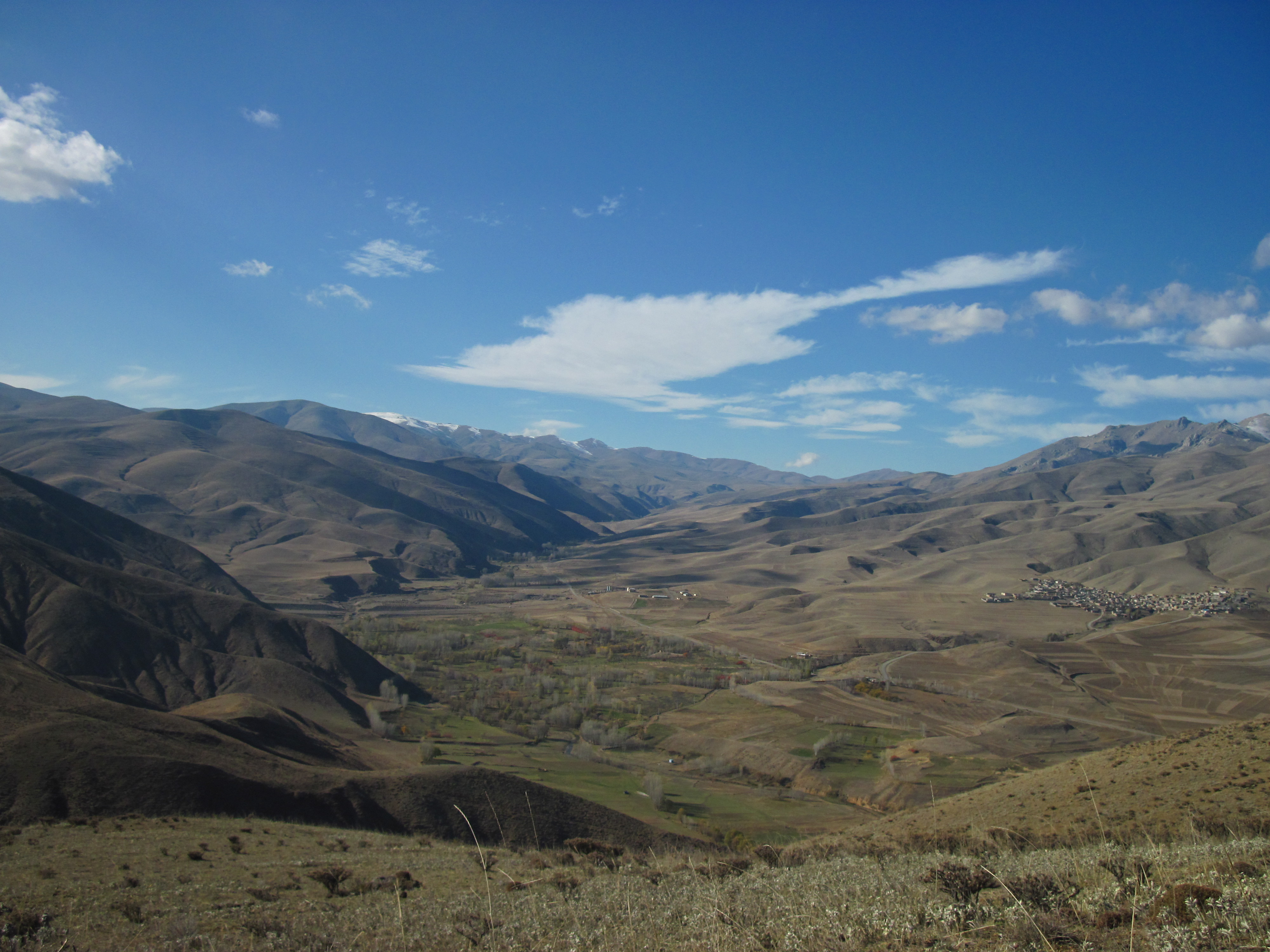
- The village of Nowjeh Deh-e Olya in November 2013

- Location within Iran
- Coordinates: 38°45′03″N 47°01′44″E
- Country: Iran
- Province: East Azerbaijan
- County: Kaleybar
- District: Central
- Rural District: Peyghan Chayi

Population (2016)
  - Total: 562
- Time zone: UTC+3:30 (IRST)

Nowjeh Deh-e Olya (Persian: نوجه ده عليا) (Note: Also romanized as Nowjeh Deh-e ‘Olyā; also known as Nowgadī Yūkhārī, Nowjeh Deh, Nowjeh Deh Karīmī (نوجه ده کريم), Nowjeh Deh-e Karīmī, Nowjeh Deh-ye Bālā, Nowjeh Deh-ye Karīmī, Nugady, Nūjeh Deh-e Karīmī, and Yukāri Nugadi) is a village in Peyghan Chayi Rural District of the Central District in Kaleybar County, East Azerbaijan province, Iran.

== Demographics ==
=== Population ===
At the time of the 2006 National Census, the village's population was 581 in 121 households. The following census in 2011 counted 658 people in 177 households. The 2016 census measured the population of the village as 562 people in 178 households.
