= Bashab =

Village in East Azerbaijan province, Iran

Bashab Persian: بشاب
- Village
- Location within Iran
- Coordinates: 39°04′35″N 47°07′47″E
- Country: Iran
- Province: East Azerbaijan
- County: Kaleybar
- District: Central
- Rural District: Mulan

Population (2016)
  - Total: 283
- Time zone: UTC+3:30 (IRST)

Bashab (Persian: بشاب) (Note: Also romanized as Bashāb) is a village in Mulan Rural District of the Central District in Kaleybar County, East Azerbaijan province, Iran.

== Demographics ==
=== Population ===
At the time of the 2006 National Census, the village's population was 455 in 112 households. The following census in 2011 counted 398 people in 115 households. The 2016 census measured the population of the village as 283 people in 96 households.
