= Peyghan =

Village in East Azerbaijan province, Iran

Peyghan Persian: پيغان
- Village
- Location within Iran
- Coordinates: 38°46′10″N 47°04′07″E
- Country: Iran
- Province: East Azerbaijan
- County: Kaleybar
- District: Central
- Rural District: Peyghan Chayi

Population (2016)
  - Total: 741
- Time zone: UTC+3:30 (IRST)

Peyghan (Persian: پيغان) (Note: Also romanized as Peyghān and Pighan; also known as Peygam and Peyghān Chāy) is a village in Peyghan Chayi Rural District of the Central District in Kaleybar County, East Azerbaijan province, Iran.

== Demographics ==
=== Population ===
At the time of the 2006 National Census, the village's population was 785 in 178 households. The following census in 2011 counted 977 people in 239 households. The 2016 census measured the population of the village as 741 people in 248 households. It was the most populous village in its rural district.
