= Damirchi Haddadan =

Village in East Azerbaijan province, Iran

Damirchi Haddadan Persian: دميرچي حدادان
- Village
- Location within Iran
- Coordinates: 38°50′22″N 46°44′00″E
- Country: Iran
- Province: East Azerbaijan
- County: Kaleybar
- District: Central
- Rural District: Misheh Pareh

Population (2016)
  - Total: 223
- Time zone: UTC+3:30 (IRST)

Damirchi Haddadan (Persian: دميرچي حدادان) (Note: Also romanized as Damīrchī Ḩaddādān; also known as Dameshlar, Dāmeshleyār, Damīrchī, Damīrchī Kandī, Damishliār, Damyshlyar, and Ḩaddādān) is a village in Misheh Pareh Rural District of the Central District in Kaleybar County, East Azerbaijan province, Iran.

== Demographics ==
=== Population ===
At the time of the 2006 National Census, the village's population was 312 in 56 households. The following census in 2011 counted 307 people in 75 households. The 2016 census measured the population of the village as 223 people in 54 households.
