= Misgar =

Misgar may refer to:

- Mazgar, a village in East Azerbaijan Province, Iran
- Misgar, Hunza, a village and a valley in Pakistan
