= Yuzband, Kaleybar =

Village in East Azerbaijan province, Iran

Yuzband Persian: يوزبند
- Village
- Location within Iran
- Coordinates: 38°44′51″N 47°07′14″E
- Country: Iran
- Province: East Azerbaijan
- County: Kaleybar
- District: Central
- Rural District: Peyghan Chayi

Population (2016)
  - Total: 719
- Time zone: UTC+3:30 (IRST)

Yuzband (Persian: يوزبند) (Note: Also romanized as Yūzband; also known as Uzband) is a village in, and the capital of, Peyghan Chayi Rural District in the Central District of Kaleybar County, East Azerbaijan province, Iran.

== Demographics ==
=== Population ===
At the time of the 2006 National Census, the village's population was 574 in 153 households. The following census in 2011 counted 605 people in 184 households. The 2016 census measured the population of the village as 719 people in 255 households.
