= Fathali-ye Soltanlu =

Village in East Azerbaijan province, Iran

Fathali-ye Soltanlu Persian: فتحعلي سلطان لو
- Village
- Location within Iran
- Coordinates: 39°08′34″N 47°12′42″E
- Country: Iran
- Province: East Azerbaijan
- County: Kaleybar
- District: Central
- Rural District: Mulan

Population (2016)
  - Total: 171
- Time zone: UTC+3:30 (IRST)

Fathali-ye Soltanlu (Persian: فتحعلي سلطان لو) (Note: Also romanized as Fatḩ‘alī-ye Solţānlū) is a village in Mulan Rural District of the Central District in Kaleybar County, East Azerbaijan province, Iran.

== Demographics ==
=== Population ===
At the time of the 2006 National Census, the village's population was 352 in 61 households. The following census in 2011 counted 238 people in 49 households. The 2016 census measured the population of the village as 171 people in 48 households.
