= Qayah Bashi-ye Bozorg =

Village in East Azerbaijan province, Iran

Qayah Bashi-ye Bozorg Persian: قيه باشي بزرگ
- Village
- Location within Iran
- Coordinates: 39°06′38″N 47°13′11″E
- Country: Iran
- Province: East Azerbaijan
- County: Kaleybar
- District: Central
- Rural District: Mulan

Population (2016)
  - Total: 1,456
- Time zone: UTC+3:30 (IRST)

Qayah Bashi-ye Bozorg (Persian: قيه باشي بزرگ) (Note: Also romanized as Qayah Bāshī-ye Bozorg; also known as Qayah Bāshī) is a village in Mulan Rural District of the Central District in Kaleybar County, East Azerbaijan province, Iran.

== Demographics ==
=== Population ===
At the time of the 2006 National Census, the village's population was 1,746 in 363 households. The following census in 2011 counted 1,628 people in 410 households. The 2016 census measured the population of the village as 1,456 people in 466 households. It was the most populous village in its rural district.
