= Aslan Beyglu =

Village in East Azerbaijan province, Iran

Aslan Beyglu Persian: اصلان بيگلو
- Village
- Location within Iran
- Coordinates: 39°05′59″N 47°11′43″E
- Country: Iran
- Province: East Azerbaijan
- County: Kaleybar
- District: Central
- Rural District: Mulan

Population (2016)
  - Total: 150
- Time zone: UTC+3:30 (IRST)

Aslan Beyglu (Persian: اصلان بيگلو) (Note: Also romanized as Aṣlān Beyglū) is a village in Mulan Rural District of the Central District in Kaleybar County, East Azerbaijan province, Iran.

== Demographics ==
=== Population ===
At the time of the 2006 National Census, the village's population was 181 in 31 households. The following census in 2011 counted 154 people in 29 households. The 2016 census measured the population of the village as 150 people in 47 households.
