= Hejran Dust =

Village in East Azerbaijan province, Iran

Hejran Dust Persian: هجران دوست
- Village
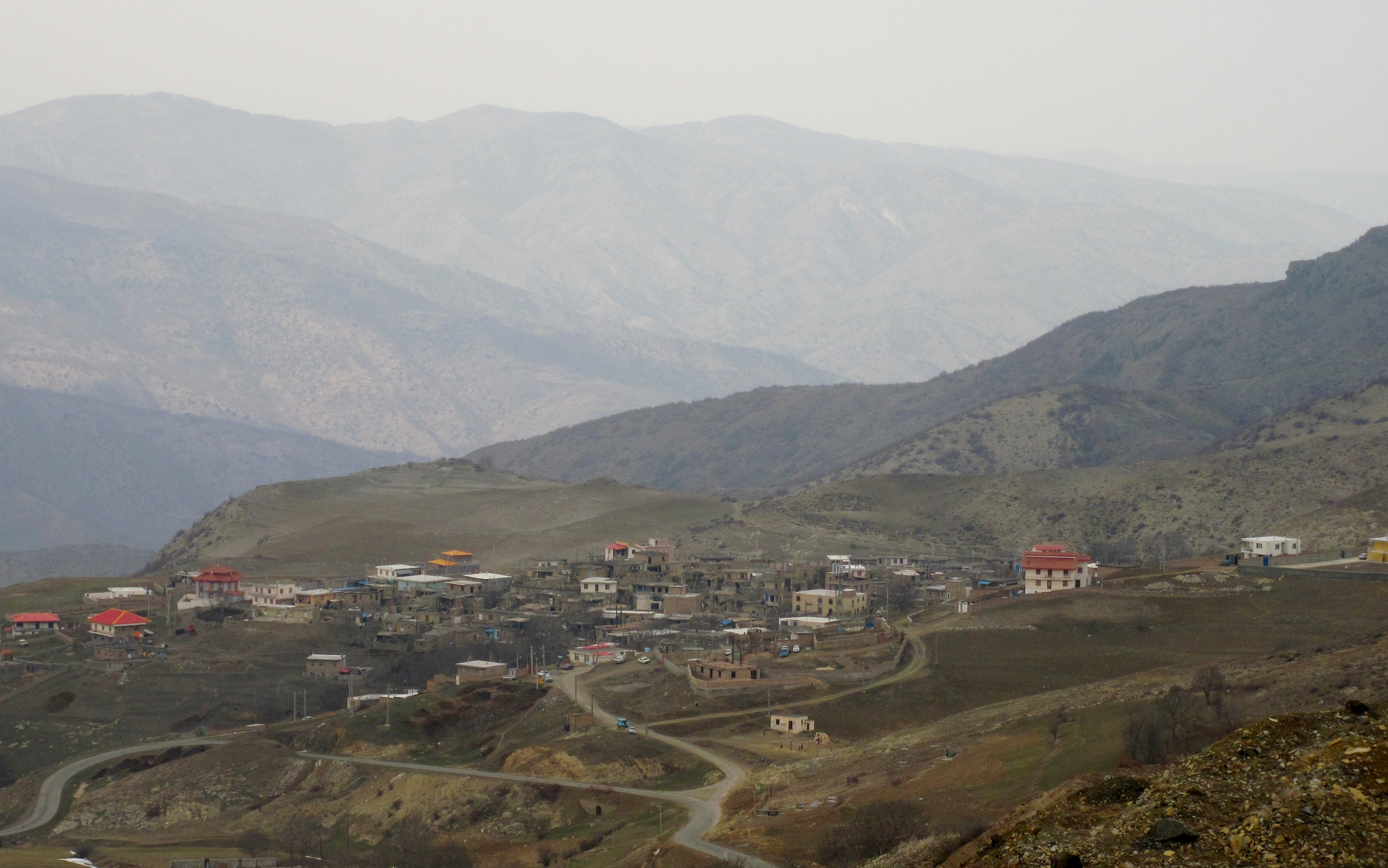
- The village of Hejran Dust in 2012

- Location within Iran
- Coordinates: 38°52′43″N 46°57′26″E
- Country: Iran
- Province: East Azerbaijan
- County: Kaleybar
- District: Central
- Rural District: Misheh Pareh

Population (2016)
  - Total: 273
- Time zone: UTC+3:30 (IRST)

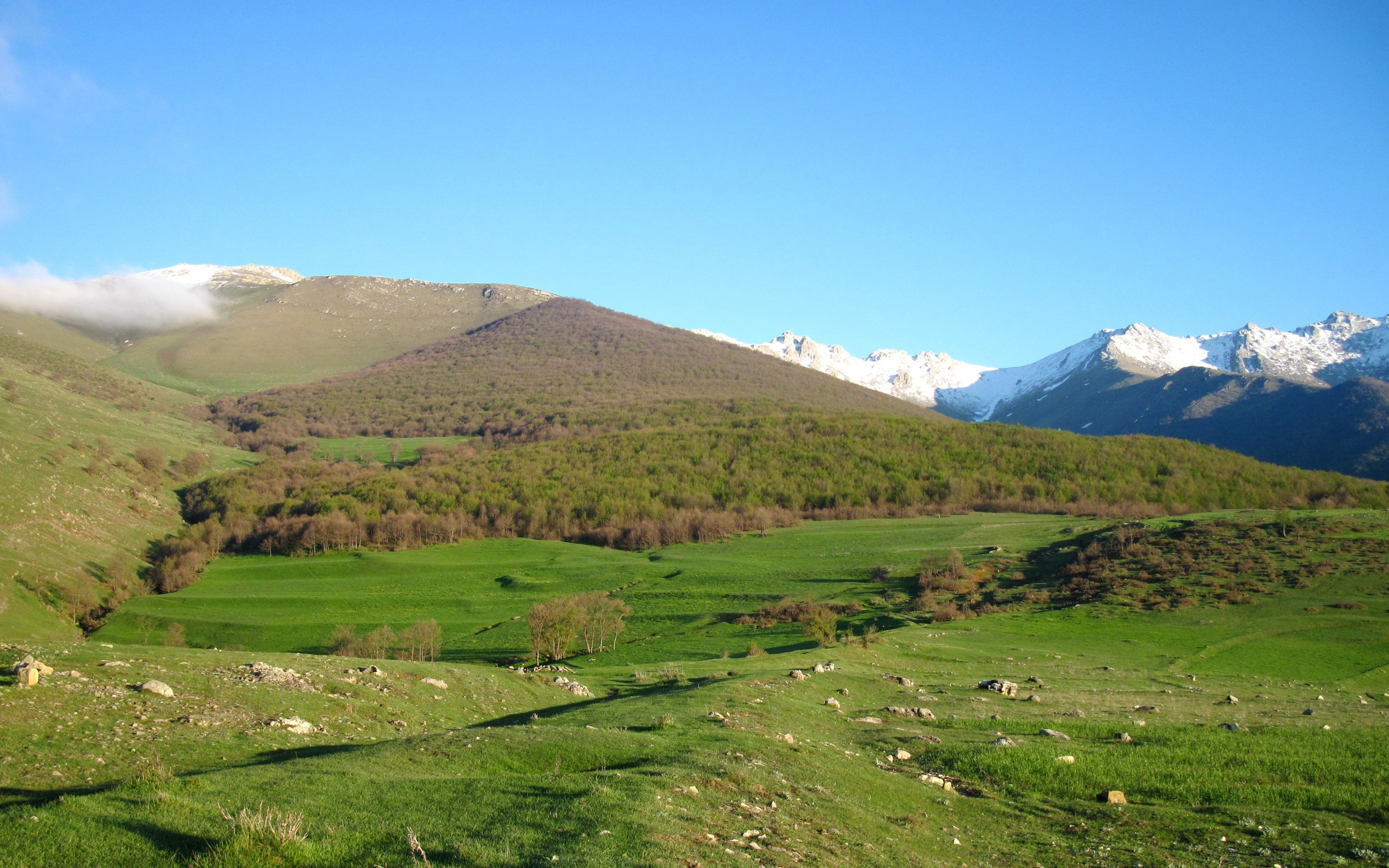
Scenic landscape as seen from the village of Hejran Dust in 2013

Hejran Dust (Persian: هجران دوست) (Note: Also romanized as Hejrān Dūst) is a village in Misheh Pareh Rural District of the Central District in Kaleybar County, East Azerbaijan province, Iran.

== Demographics ==
=== Population ===
At the time of the 2006 National Census, the village's population was 196 in 63 households. The following census in 2011 counted 311 people in 101 households. The 2016 census measured the population of the village as 273 people in 99 households.
