= Mulan, Iran =

Village in East Azerbaijan province, Iran

Mulan Persian: ماولان
- Village
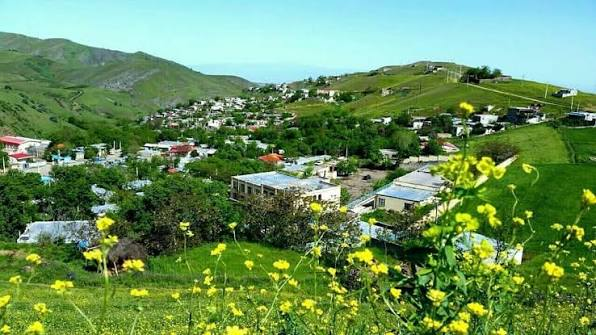

- Location within Iran
- Coordinates: 39°04′38″N 47°11′04″E
- Country: Iran
- Province: East Azerbaijan
- County: Kaleybar
- District: Central
- Rural District: Mulan

Population (2016)
  - Total: 734
- Time zone: UTC+3:30 (IRST)

Mulan (Persian: مولان) (Note: Also romanized as Mavlān, Mawlān, Mowlān, and Mūlān) is a village in, and the capital of, Mulan Rural District in the Central District of Kaleybar County, East Azerbaijan province, Iran.

== Demographics ==
=== Population ===
At the time of the 2006 National Census, the village's population was 1,054 in 273 households. The following census in 2011 counted 939 people in 285 households. The 2016 census measured the population of the village as 734 people in 245 households.
