= Oskelu =

Village in East Azerbaijan province, Iran

Oskelu Persian: اسکلو
- Village
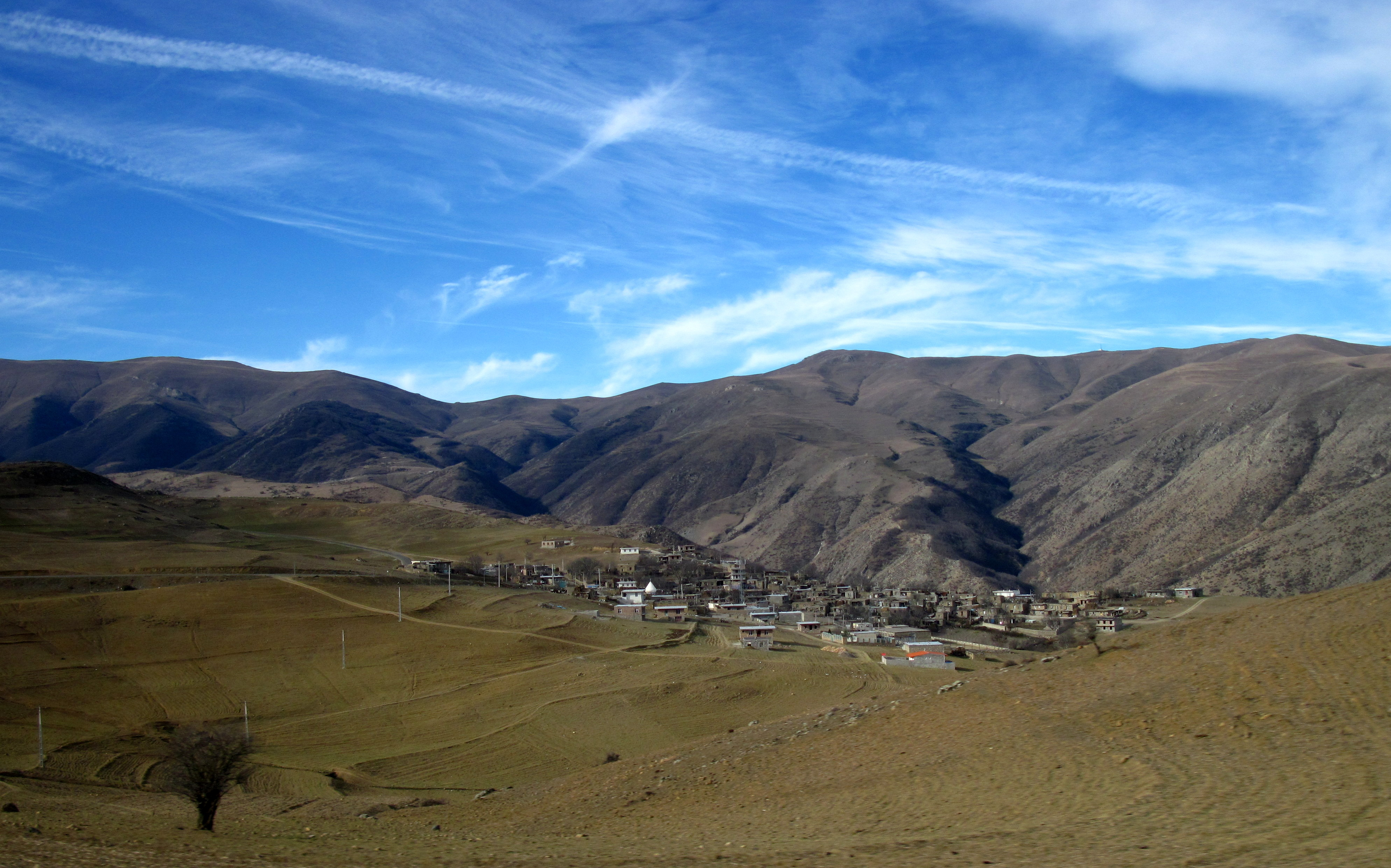
- A distant view of Oskelu in December 2010

- Location within Iran
- Coordinates: 38°52′22″N 46°53′53″E
- Country: Iran
- Province: East Azerbaijan
- County: Kaleybar
- District: Central
- Rural District: Misheh Pareh

Population (2016)
  - Total: 393
- Time zone: UTC+3:30 (IRST)

Oskelu (Persian: اسکلو) (Note: Also romanized as Eskaloo, Eskalū, and Oskelū; also known as Iskyulyu and Osgelū; also rendered as Üskülü)) is a village in, and the capital of, Misheh Pareh Rural District in the Central District of Kaleybar County, East Azerbaijan province, Iran.

== Demographics ==
=== Population ===
At the time of the 2006 National Census, the village's population was 428 in 109 households. The following census in 2011 counted 430 people in 134 households. The 2016 census measured the population of the village as 393 people in 132 households. It was the most populous village in its rural district.

== Overview ==
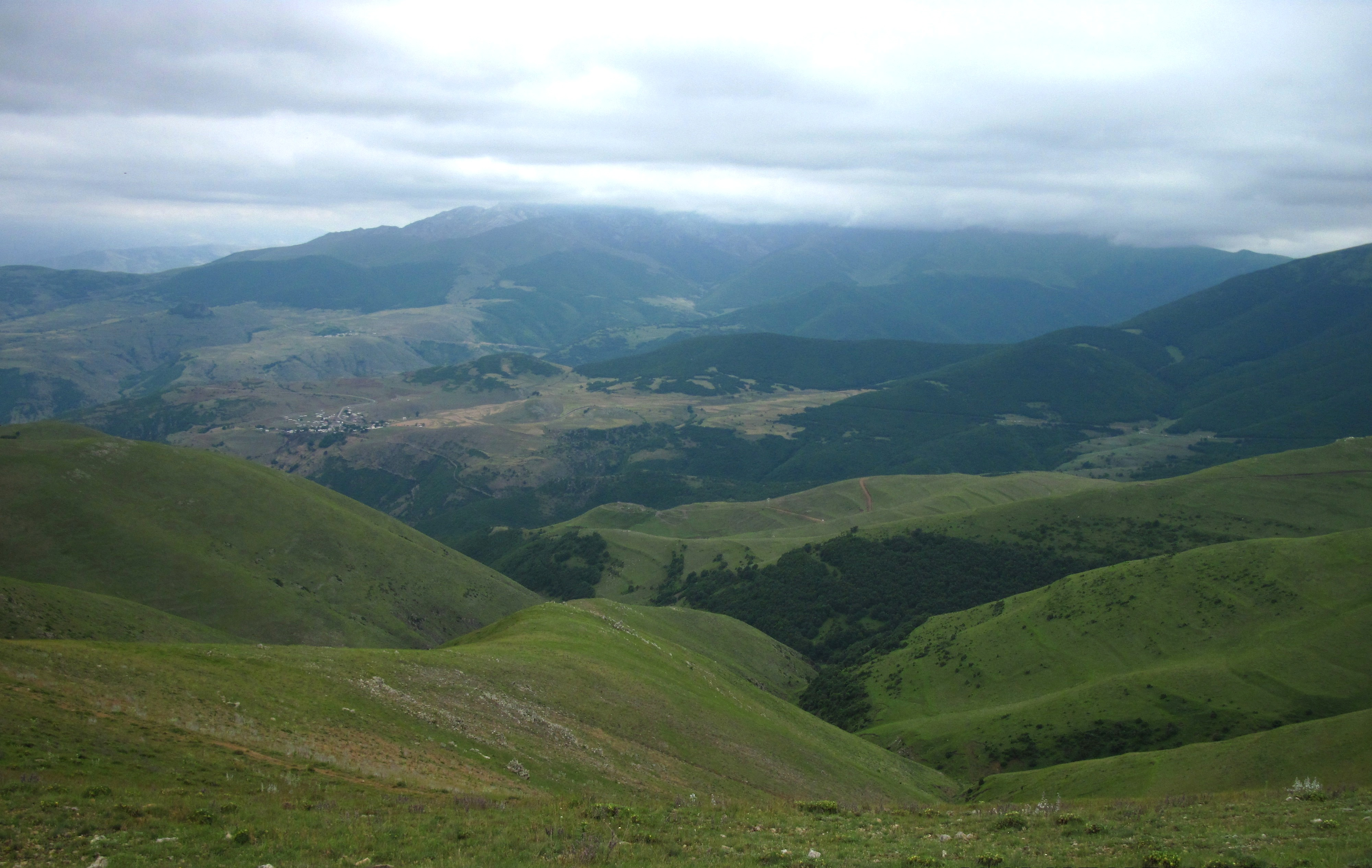
A distant view of Oskelu (July 2013) from Chaparli summer camp.

According to locals the village had been occasionally used by the crown princes in the Qajar era as summer quarters. There is no record of such claim, but the surviving landscaping in a forest on the west side of the village, known as 'valiahd qoroghi, provides a strong support to the assertion. The first alluson to Oskelu in the published literature is by Asadollah Mohammadkhanlu, the last headman of Mohammad Khanlu tribe, who had counted some of the inhabitants as the settled member of the tribe.

During the 1980s and early 1990s Oskelu was the last village on the west of Kaleybar that had access to a town via paved road. One of the inhabitants, Mashhadi Aziz, had built an inn with minimum accommodation for the travelers to the remote villages, such as Abbasaba and Balan. Then, the road was extended to Asheqlu in the banks of Aras river and Oskelu lost most of its importance. However, Oskelu did not experience the drastic population decline of other villages in Arasbaran region. Instead, since 2005 the wealthy expatriates have returned and constructed modern summer residences.
