= Tribes of Karadagh =

Arasbaran, also known as Karadagh in Azerbaijani language (قره‌داغ), is a vast mountainous area in the north of East Azarbaijan Province in Iran. In this area there were several Turkic tribes, including the Beghdillu, Haji-Alilu, Hoseynaklu, Hasanbeyglu, Ilyaskhanlu, Tokhmaqlu, Bayburdlu and Qaradaghlu. All of these tribes are now sedentary, but characteristic aspects of their culture, developed around nomadic pastoralism, have persisted to our times.

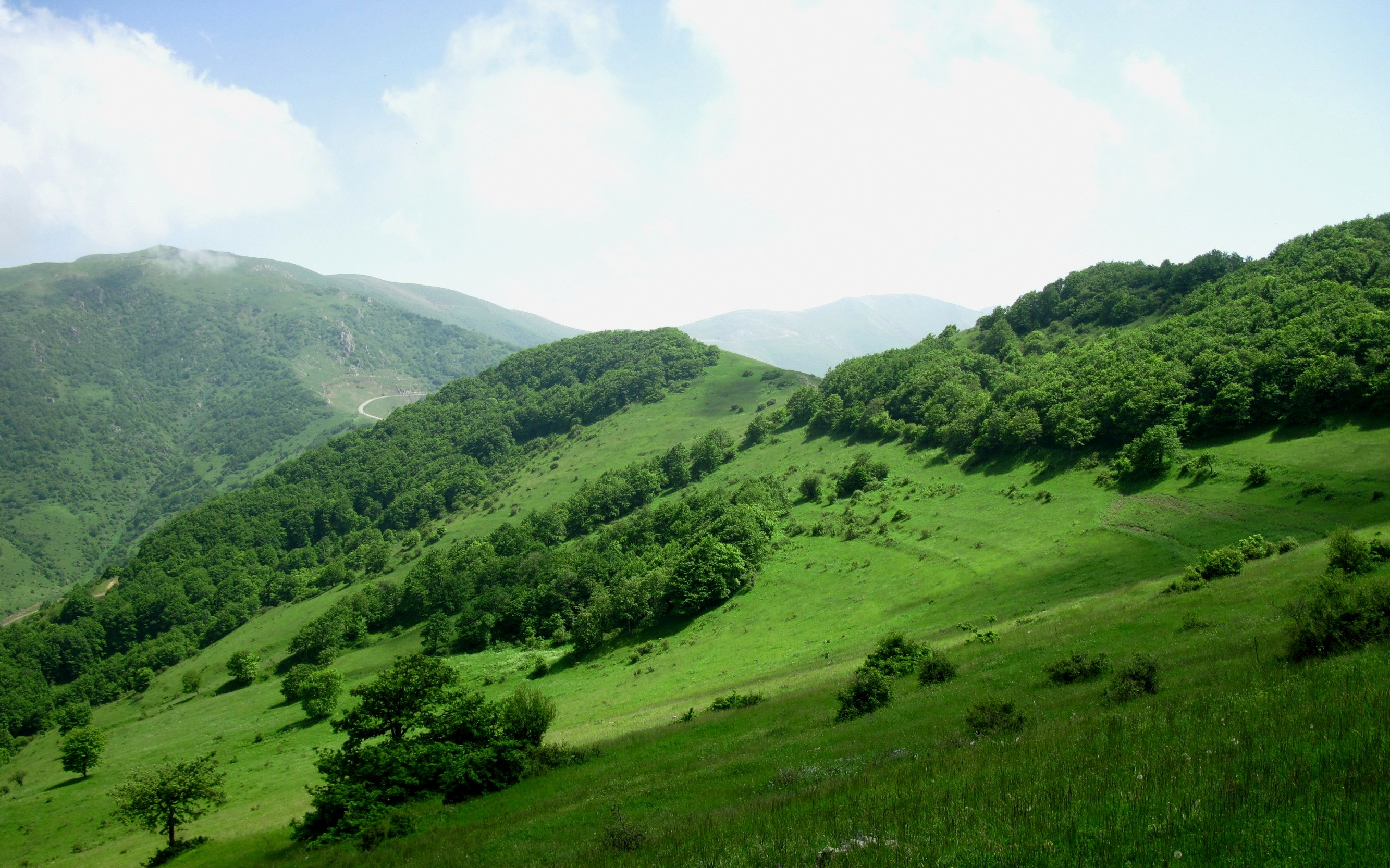
Aqdash temporary pasturage of migrating tribes.

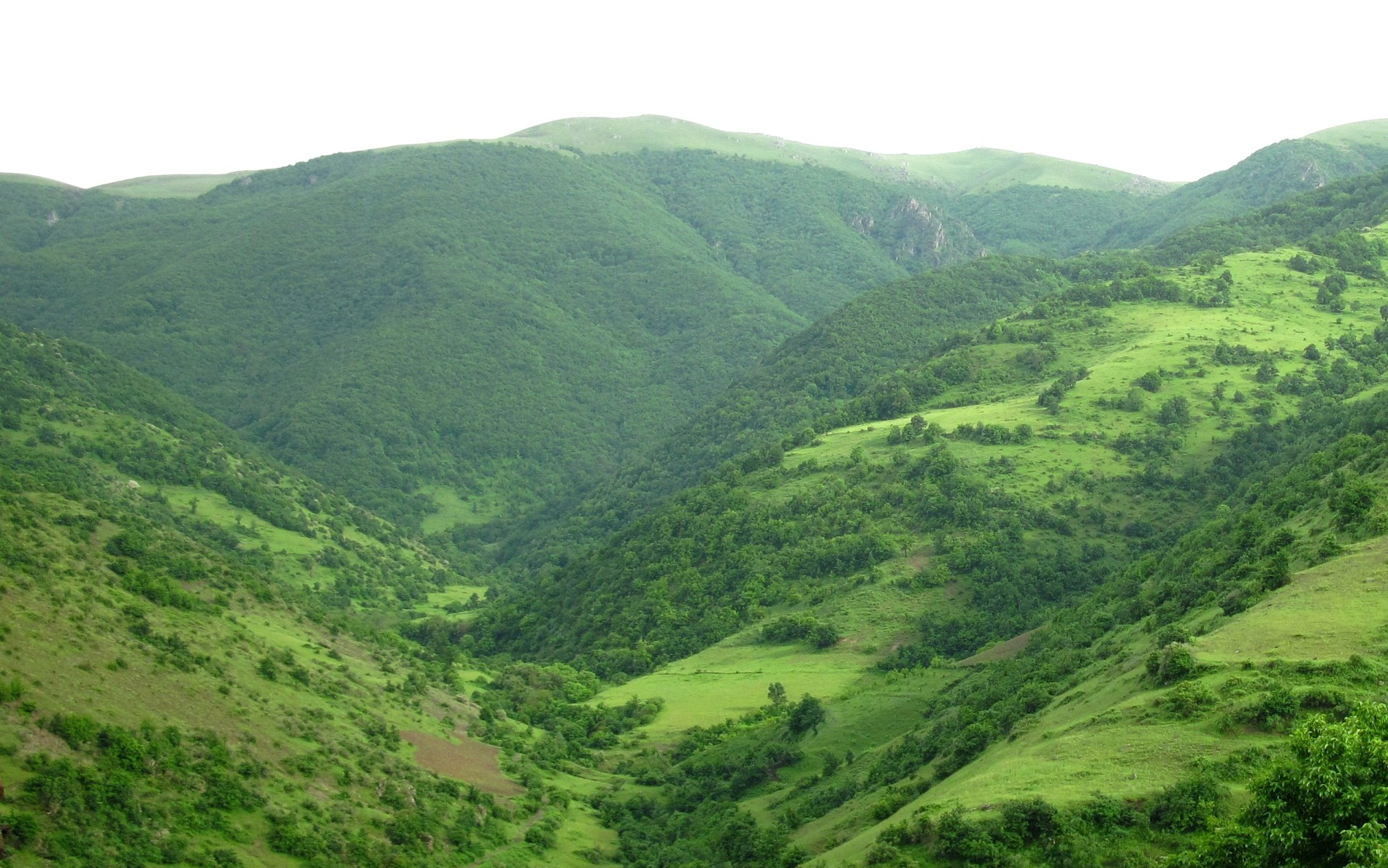
Chaparli summer camp near Abbasabad is still used as a summer camp by remnants of Mohammad Khanlu.

== Land ownership ==
According to A. Lampton, in the Karadagh Khanate the pasturage belonged to Khans, who also owned arable land in the winter quarters.

== History ==
In the following sections, a brief history of Arasbaran tribes is given according to a comprehensive article by Oberling and other English language sources. More information may be found in a Persian book by Colonel H. Baibordi.

=== History until the Persian Constitutional Revolution of 1906 ===
In the wake of Russo-Persian War (1804–13) a significant fraction of the inhabitants of Arasbaran lived as nomadic tribes. The major tribes included the Haji-Alilu with 800 tents and houses, Begdillu 200, and various minor groups 500. At the time, Ahar, with 3500 inhabitants, was the only city of Qaradağ. It is not clear when the remaining three tribes were founded. In Arasbaran the tribe is a political entity rather than an ethnic concept, and therefore the bond between different families in the tribe is through their allegiance to a common chief. Therefore, at a critical moment of time a strong man, often from the ruling family of a tribe, may have gathered sufficient number of nomadic families and formed a new tribe.

=== The status of tribes in the wake of the White Revolution ===
After World War II, the central government commissioned the security of, generally unruly tribes, to tribal chiefs. This had disastrous results in Arasbaran as the chiefs apparently used their weapons "to overawe their settled neighbors and to levy illegal dues". Consequently, villagers started migrating to Tabriz and Tehran well before the White Revolution, which was intended to improve the living conditions of peasants.

== The cultural relics of tribes ==
During the epoch of Rezā Shāh (1925–1941) there was a concerted campaign not only to settle the pastoral nomads but also to eliminate their distinctive culture in terms of language, dress and authority structures. The nomads reverted to their former lifestyle following the king's forced abdication. The new king, Mohammad Reza Pahlavi, began persecution of nomads after introducing his White Revolution in early 1960s. Following the departure of the Shah and the ensuing period of uncertainty, some nomads revived remnants of their culture without attempting to return to the traditional authority structures. After the end of the Iran–Iraq War in 1988, the Islamic government promoted selective aspects of nomadic life, and, accordingly, government sponsored TV series were made. Unfortunately, none of the noteworthy programs were dedicated to the Tribes of Arasbaran. The government's unexpectedly soft approach to the Ashik music, has provided the Tribes of Arasbaran a way to safeguard their cultural identity. Ashik music has evolved in relation to the pastoral life of Turkic tribes and was mainly preserved in the Arasbaran region during the cultural repression of the Pahlavi era.
