= Haji-Alilu =

Turkic tribe

Hadji-Alilou is one on the six major Tribes of Arasbaran. It is a Turkic tribe with two branches; one dwelling in the vicinity of Maragheh, and main branch lives north of Varzaqan and Ahar in the Qarājadāḡ region of East Azerbaijan Province of Iran. In the wake of Russo-Persian War (1804–13) Haji-Alilou comprised 800 tents. During the Persian Constitutional Revolution, the tribe's head, Sardar Ashayer and his brother Amir Arshad(un grand chef militaire)supported the revolutionary forces against the Chalabianlu tribe and their allies, who, under the leadership of Rahimkhan Chalabianloo, had been the major supporters of the deposed Mohammad Ali Shah Qajar.
