= Aghuyeh, East Azerbaijan =

Village in East Azerbaijan province, Iran

Aghuyeh Persian: اغويه
- Village
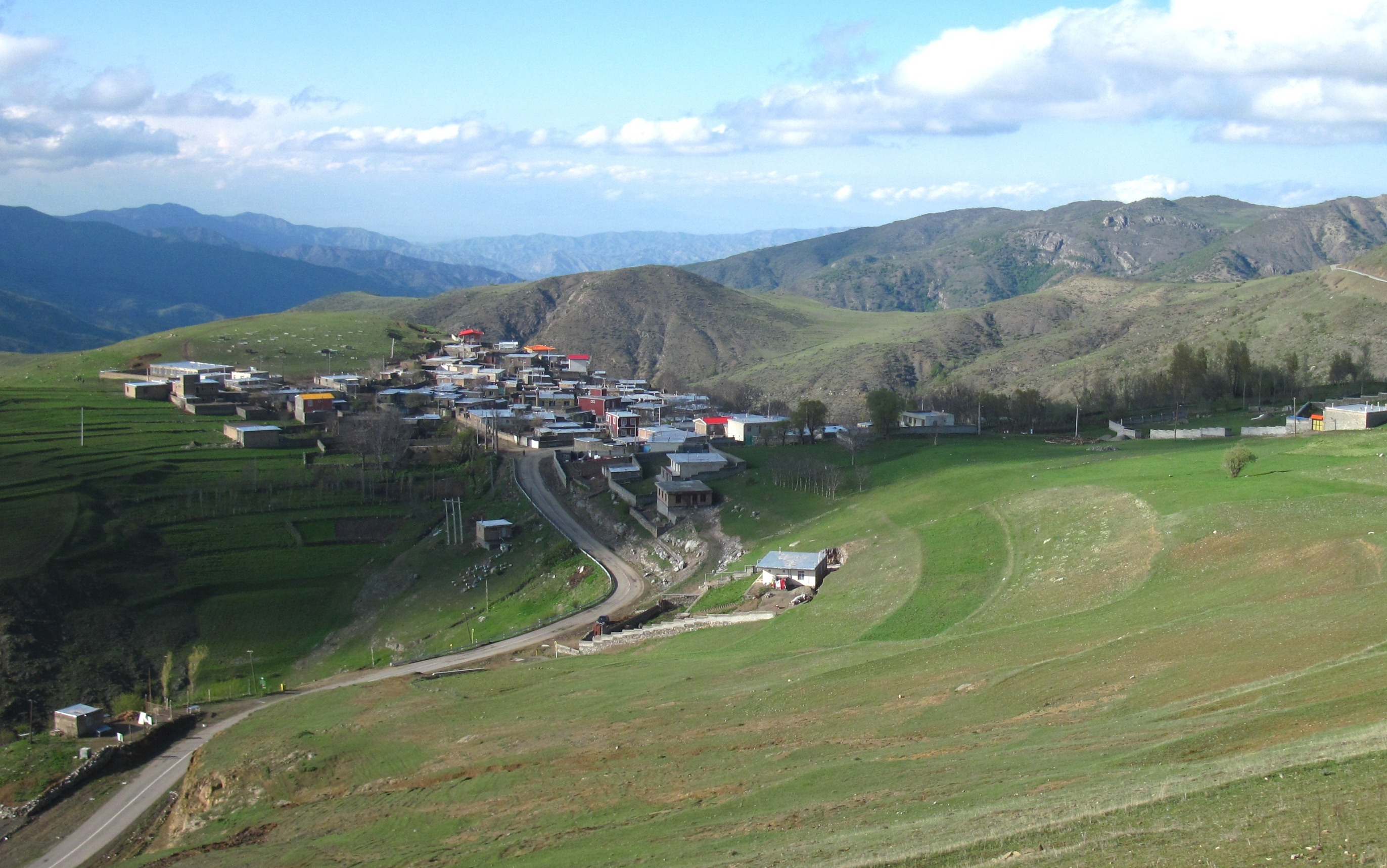
- The village of Aghuyeh

- Location within Iran
- Coordinates: 38°51′45″N 46°56′04″E
- Country: Iran
- Province: East Azerbaijan
- County: Kaleybar
- District: Central
- Rural District: Misheh Pareh

Population (2016)
  - Total: 242
- Time zone: UTC+3:30 (IRST)

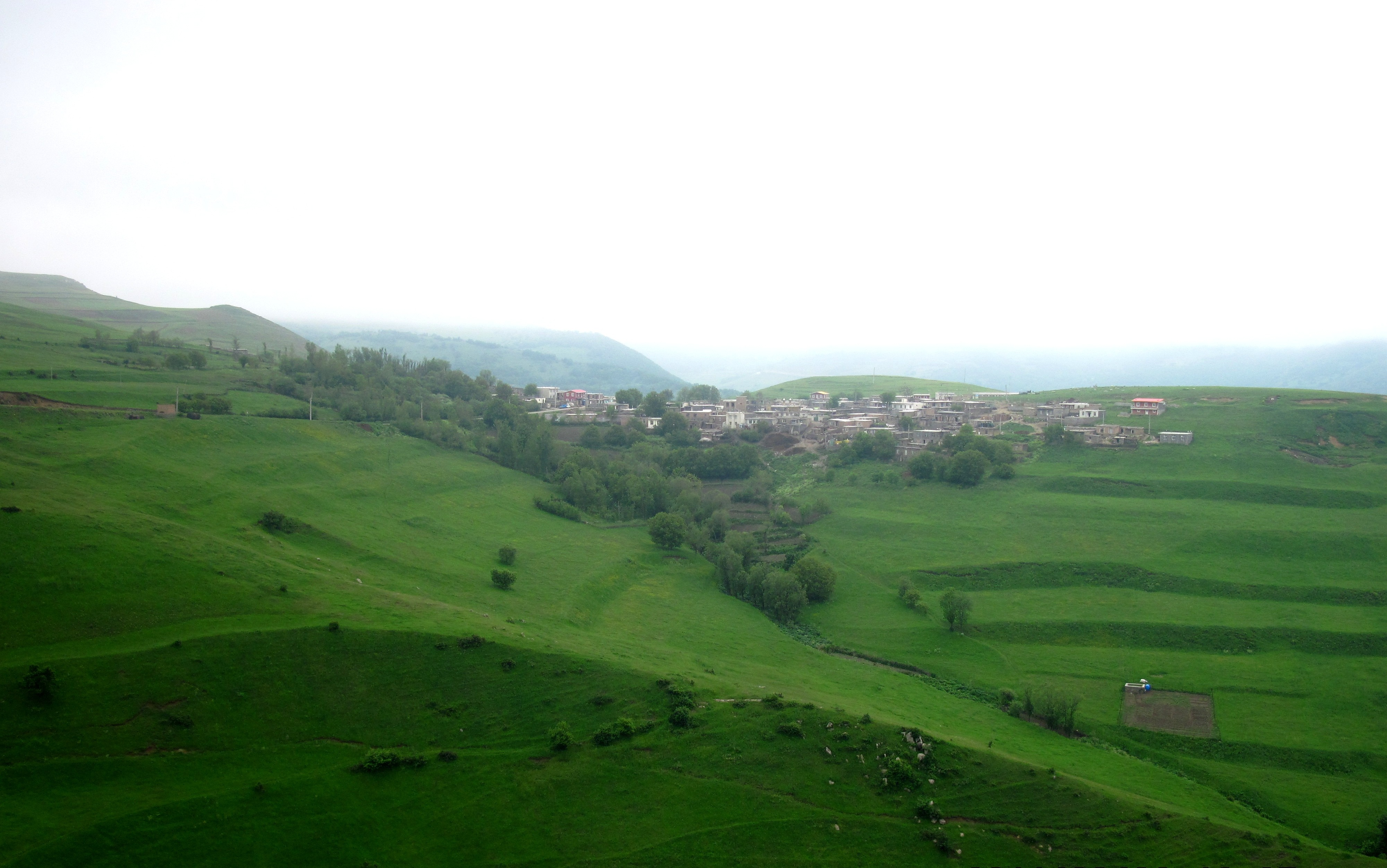
A distant view of Aghuyeh in 2011

Aghuyeh (Persian: اغويه) (Note: Also romanized as Aghooyeh, Āghūyeh, Aghveyeh, and Āghvīyeh; also known as Agi) is a village in Misheh Pareh Rural District of the Central District in Kaleybar County, East Azerbaijan province, Iran.

== Demographics ==
=== Population ===
At the time of the 2006 National Census, the village's population was 250 in 54 households. The following census in 2011 counted 312 people in 100 households. The 2016 census measured the population of the village as 242 people in 83 households.
