= Agdash Abbasabad =

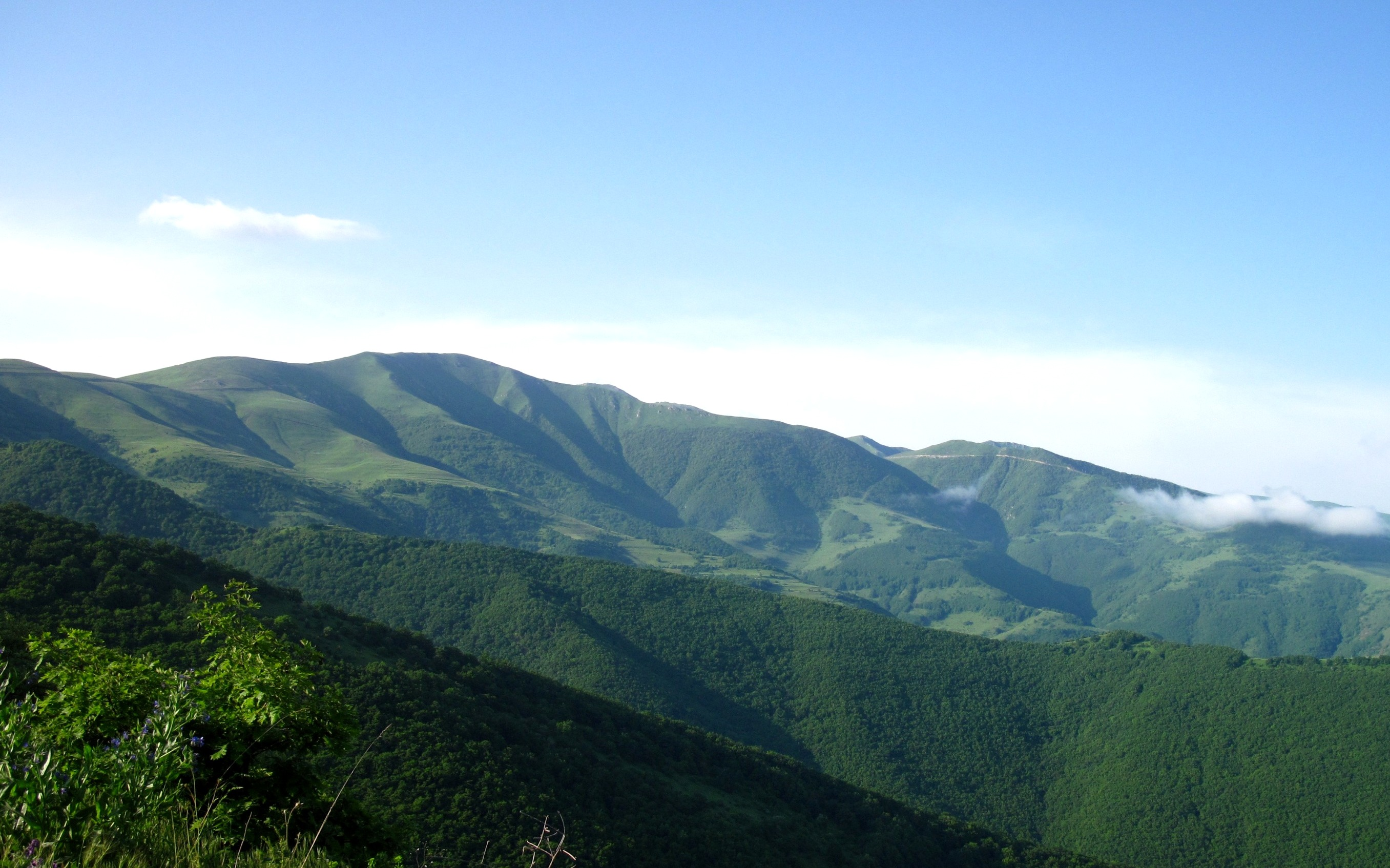
A view of Agdash pastures in June.

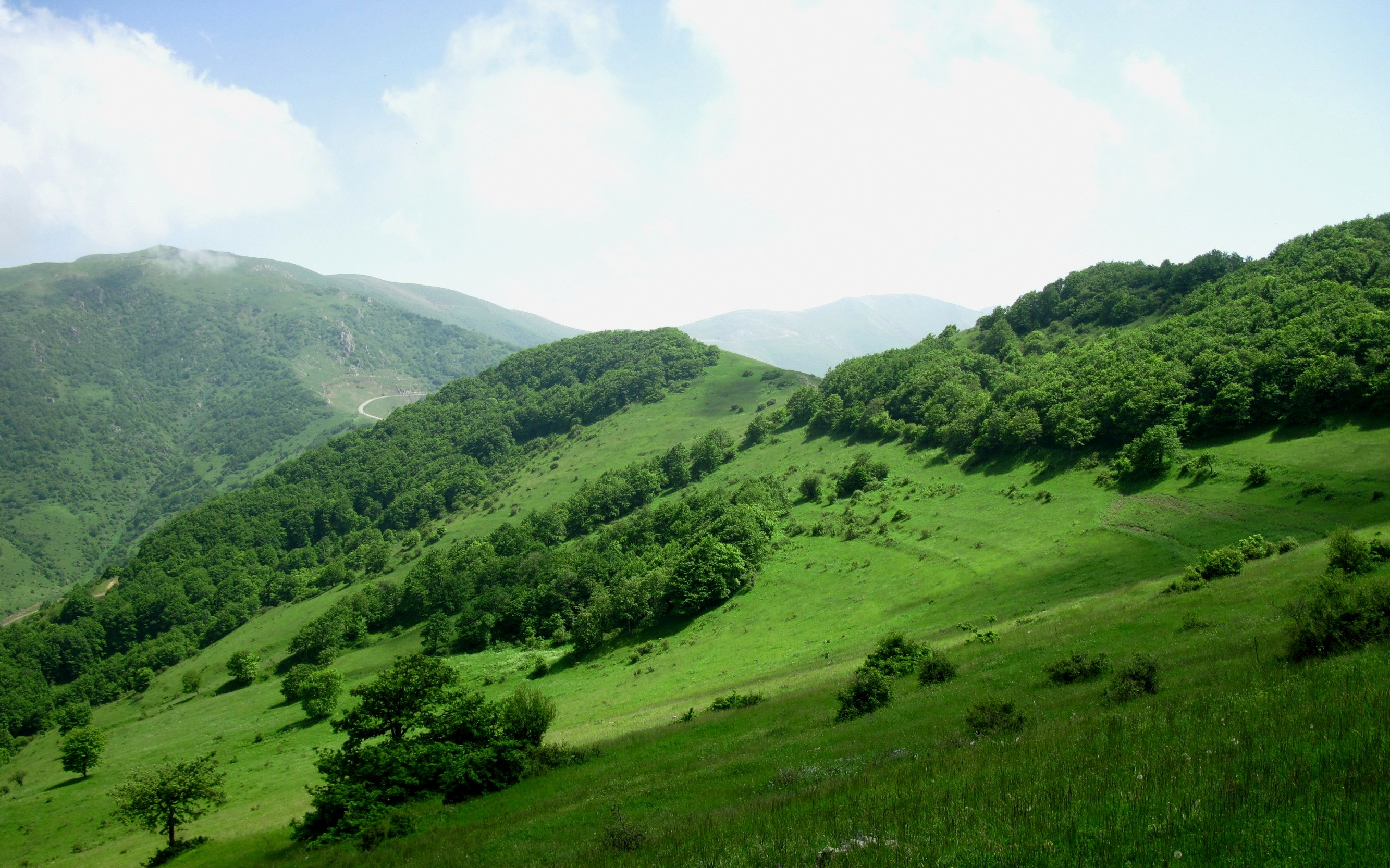
A view of Agdash pastures in June.

Agdash (آقداش) is a summer camp in the Arasbaran region, which is located on lush mountains overlooking Abbasabad, Oskolou and Balan villages. In summer months many families from low lands of Arasbaran pitch their camps on the site and raise their livestock.

Another name of Agdash is Topkhaneh, perhaps a reference to the time of the Russo-Persian War (1826–28) when the Iranian military had set their infantry in the area. According to local elders the final defeat of Mohammad Khanlu in the battle with Haji-Alilu tribe, commended by Amir Arshad, occurred in Agdash. In northern slopes of the mountain chain there is an area which is known as Nəbi Ölən, so named in the honor of the slain commander of the Mohammad Khanlu warriors.

The area has been peaceful since 1910. Nowadays, the lush mountain chain is a source of inspiration for the new generation of poets, Ashugs, and those romantic idealists looking for relics of imagined bygone idyllic lives of pastoralists.
