= Misheh Pareh Rural District =

Rural district in East Azerbaijan province, Iran

Misheh Pareh Rural District Persian: دهستان ميشه پاره
- Rural District
- Location within Iran
- Coordinates: 38°50′N 46°51′E
- Country: Iran
- Province: East Azerbaijan
- County: Kaleybar
- District: Central
- Established: 1987
- Capital: Oskelu

Population (2016)
  - Total: 2,757
- Time zone: UTC+3:30 (IRST)

Misheh Pareh Rural District (Persian: دهستان ميشه پاره) (Note: Armenian: Մեշափար Գաւառակ) is in the Central District of Kaleybar County, East Azerbaijan province, Iran. Its capital is the village of Oskelu.

== Demographics ==
=== Population ===
At the time of the 2006 National Census, the rural district's population was 3,034 in 665 households. There were 3,137 inhabitants in 929 households at the following census of 2011. The 2016 census measured the population of the rural district as 2,757 in 920 households. The most populous of its 41 villages was Oskelu, with 393 people.

=== Other villages in the rural district ===
- Aghuyeh
- Damirchi Haddadan
- Hejran Dust
- Marzrud
