= Mulan Rural District =

Rural district in East Azerbaijan province, Iran

Mulan Rural District Persian: دهستان مولان
- Rural District
- Location within Iran
- Coordinates: 39°04′N 47°11′E
- Country: Iran
- Province: East Azerbaijan
- County: Kaleybar
- District: Central
- Established: 1987
- Capital: Mulan

Population (2016)
  - Total: 4,001
- Time zone: UTC+3:30 (IRST)

Mulan Rural District (Persian: دهستان مولان) is in the Central District of Kaleybar County, East Azerbaijan province, Iran. Its capital is the village of Mulan.

== Demographics ==
=== Population ===
At the time of the 2006 National Census, the rural district's population was 5,785 in 1,242 households. There were 4,897 inhabitants in 1,304 households at the following census of 2011. The 2016 census measured the population of the rural district as 4,001 in 1,311 households. The most populous of its 30 villages was Qayah Bashi-ye Bozorg, with 1,456 people.

=== Other villages in the rural district ===
- Aslan Beyglu
- Bashab
- Fathali-ye Soltanlu
