= Peyghan Chayi Rural District =

Rural district in East Azerbaijan province, Iran

Peyghan Chayi Rural District Persian: دهستان پيغان چايي
- Rural District
- Location within Iran
- Coordinates: 38°44′N 47°05′E
- Country: Iran
- Province: East Azerbaijan
- County: Kaleybar
- District: Central
- Established: 1987
- Capital: Yuzband

Population (2016)
  - Total: 5,452
- Time zone: UTC+3:30 (IRST)

Peyghan Chayi Rural District (Persian: دهستان پيغان چايي) is in the Central District of Kaleybar County, East Azerbaijan province, Iran. Its capital is the village of Yuzband.

== Demographics ==
=== Population ===
At the time of the 2006 National Census, the rural district's population was 5,981 in 1,308 households. There were 5,848 inhabitants in 1,547 households at the following census of 2011. The 2016 census measured the population of the rural district as 5,452 in 1,776 households. The most populous of its 50 villages was Peyghan, with 741 people.

=== Other villages in the rural district ===
- Kalalaq
- Nowjeh Deh-e Olya
