= Central District (Kaleybar County) =

District in East Azerbaijan province, Iran

Central District (Kaleybar County) Persian: بخش مرکزی شهرستان کلیبر
- District
- Location within Iran
- Coordinates: 38°54′N 46°58′E
- Country: Iran
- Province: East Azerbaijan
- County: Kaleybar
- Established: 1989
- Capital: Kaleybar

Population (2016)
  - Total: 24,297
- Time zone: UTC+3:30 (IRST)

The Central District of Kaleybar County (Persian: بخش مرکزی شهرستان کلیبر) is in East Azerbaijan province, Iran. Its capital is the city of Kaleybar.

== Demographics ==
=== Population ===
At the time of the 2006 National Census, the district's population was 27,676 in 6,450 households. The following census in 2011 counted 26,652 people in 7,261 households. The 2016 census measured the population of the district as 24,297 inhabitants in 7,832 households.

=== Administrative divisions ===
Central District (Kaleybar County) Population
Administrative Divisions	2006	2011	2016
Misheh Pareh RD	3,034	3,137	2,757
Mulan RD	5,785	4,897	4,001
Peyghan Chayi RD	5,981	5,848	5,452
Yeylaq RD	3,846	2,883	2,763
Kaleybar (city)	9,030	9,887	9,324
Total	27,676	26,652	24,297
RD = Rural District
