= Seyyedlar =

Seyyedlar or Seyyed Lar (Persian: سيدلر) may refer to:

- Seyyedlar, Ardabil
- Seyyedlar, Ungut
- Seyyedlar-e Zahra, Ardabil Province
- Seyyedlar, Ahar, East Azerbaijan Province
- Seyyedlar, Khoda Afarin, East Azerbaijan Province
- Seyyedlar, Kandovan, Meyaneh County, East Azerbaijan Province
- Seyyedlar, Qaflankuh-e Gharbi, Meyaneh County, East Azerbaijan Province
- Seyyedlar, Torkamanchay, Meyaneh County, East Azerbaijan Province
- Seyyed Lar, Varzaqan, East Azerbaijan Province
- Seyyedlar-e Olya, East Azerbaijan Province
- Seyyedlar-e Sofla, East Azerbaijan Province
- Seyyed Lar, Gilan
- Seyyedlar, Golestan

== See also ==
- Seyidlər (disambiguation), places in Azerbaijan
