= Qeshlaq-e Qarah Daghlu =

Qeshlaq-e Qarah Daghlu قشلاق قره داغلو
- Village
- Location within Iran
- Coordinates: 39.128°N 47.332°E
- Country: Iran
- Province: East Azerbaijan
- County: Kaleybar
- Bakhsh: Abish Ahmad
- Rural District: Qeshlaq

Population (2006)
  - Total: 455
- Time zone: UTC+3:30 (IRST)
  - Summer (DST): UTC+4:30 (IRDT)

Qeshlaq-e Qarah Daghlu (Persian: قشلاق قره داغلو, also Romanized as Qeshlāq-e Qarah Dāghlū) is a village in Qeshlaq Rural District, Abish Ahmad District, Kaleybar County, East Azerbaijan Province, Iran. At the 2006 census, its population was 455, in 82 families. The village is populated by the Kurdish Chalabianlu tribe.
