= Pir Ahmadlu =

Pir Ahmadlu پيراحمدلو
- Village
- Location within Iran
- Coordinates: 39°07′34″N 47°15′48″E
- Country: Iran
- Province: East Azerbaijan
- County: Kaleybar
- Bakhsh: Abish Ahmad
- Rural District: Qeshlaq

Population (2006)
  - Total: 95
- Time zone: UTC+3:30 (IRST)
  - Summer (DST): UTC+4:30 (IRDT)

Pir Ahmadlu (Persian: پيراحمدلو, also Romanized as Pīr Aḩmadlū) is a village in Qeshlaq Rural District, Abish Ahmad District, Kaleybar County, East Azerbaijan Province, Iran. At the 2006 census, its population was 95, in 21 families. The village is populated by the Kurdish Chalabianlu tribe.
