= Hasan Ali-ye Kadkhodalu =

Hasan Ali-ye Kadkhodalu حسنعلي كدخدالو
- Village
- Location within Iran
- Coordinates: 39°14′02″N 47°12′35″E
- Country: Iran
- Province: East Azerbaijan
- County: Kaleybar
- Bakhsh: Abish Ahmad
- Rural District: Qeshlaq

Population (2006)
  - Total: 312
- Time zone: UTC+3:30 (IRST)
  - Summer (DST): UTC+4:30 (IRDT)

Hasan Ali-ye Kadkhodalu (Persian: حسنعلي كدخدالو, also Romanized as Ḩasan ‘Alī-ye Kadkhodālū; also known as Ḩasan‘alī Kadkhodālū) is a village in Qeshlaq Rural District, Abish Ahmad District, Kaleybar County, East Azerbaijan Province, Iran. At the 2006 census, its population was 312, composed of 49 families. The village is populated by the Kurdish Chalabianlu tribe.
