= Qeshlaq-e Qarah Baghlu =

Qeshlaq-e Qarah Baghlu قشلاق قره باغلو
- Village
- Location within Iran
- Coordinates: 39.172°N 47.406°E
- Country: Iran
- Province: East Azerbaijan
- County: Kaleybar
- Bakhsh: Abish Ahmad
- Rural District: Qeshlaq

Population (2006)
  - Total: 173
- Time zone: UTC+3:30 (IRST)
  - Summer (DST): UTC+4:30 (IRDT)

Qeshlaq-e Qarah Baghlu (Persian: قشلاق قره باغلو, also Romanized as Qeshlāq-e Qarah Bāghlū) is a village in Qeshlaq Rural District, Abish Ahmad District, Kaleybar County, East Azerbaijan Province, Iran. At the 2006 census, its population was 173, in 34 families. The village is populated by the Kurdish Chalabianlu tribe.
