= Kaghlu Guzlu =

Kaghlu Guzlu كاغلوگوزلو
- Village
- Location within Iran
- Coordinates: 39°13′55″N 47°26′10″E
- Country: Iran
- Province: East Azerbaijan
- County: Kaleybar
- Bakhsh: Abish Ahmad
- Rural District: Qeshlaq

Population (2006)
  - Total: 348
- Time zone: UTC+3:30 (IRST)
  - Summer (DST): UTC+4:30 (IRDT)

Kaghlu Guzlu (Persian: كاغلوگوزلو, also Romanized as Kāghlū Gūzlū) is a village in Qeshlaq Rural District, Abish Ahmad District, Kaleybar County, East Azerbaijan Province, Iran. At the 2006 census, its population was 348, in 72 families. The village is populated by the Kurdish Chalabianlu tribe.
