= Pirehlar-e Shah Qasem =

Pirehlar-e Shah Qasem پيره لرشاه قاسم
- Village
- Country: Iran
- Province: East Azerbaijan
- County: Kaleybar
- Bakhsh: Abish Ahmad
- Rural District: Abish Ahmad

Population (2006)
  - Total: 202
- Time zone: UTC+3:30 (IRST)
  - Summer (DST): UTC+4:30 (IRDT)

Pirehlar-e Shah Qasem (Persian: پيره لرشاه قاسم, also Romanized as Pīrehlar-e Shāh Qāsem) is a village in Abish Ahmad Rural District, Abish Ahmad District, Kaleybar County, East Azerbaijan Province, Iran. At the 2006 census, its population was 202, in 49 families.
