= Qalyan Saz =

Qalyan Saz قليانساز
- Village
- Location within Iran
- Coordinates: 39°02′01″N 47°11′48″E
- Country: Iran
- Province: East Azerbaijan
- County: Kaleybar
- Bakhsh: Abish Ahmad
- Rural District: Seyyedan

Population (2006)
  - Total: 28
- Time zone: UTC+3:30 (IRST)
  - Summer (DST): UTC+4:30 (IRDT)

Qalyan Saz (Persian: قليانساز, also Romanized as Qalyān Sāz) is a village in Seyyedan Rural District, Abish Ahmad District, Kaleybar County, East Azerbaijan Province, Iran. At the 2006 census, its population was 28, in 5 families.
