= Ojaq (disambiguation) =

Ojaq (Persian: اوجاق) may refer to several places in Iran:

- Ojaq Qeshlaq-e Khoruslu, a village in Bileh Savar County, Ardabil province
- Ojaq Alazar, a village in Germi County, Ardabil province
- Ojaq Qeshlaqi, a village in Meshgin Shahr County, Ardabil province
- Ojaq Qoli Kandi, a village in Meshgin Shahr County, Ardabil province
- Ojaq Kandi, Hashtrud, a village in Hashtrud County, East Azerbaijan province
- Ojaq Kandi, Khoda Afarin, a village in the Central District of Khoda Afarin County, East Azerbaijan province
- Ojaq Kandi, Minjavan, a village in Minjavan District of Khoda Afarin County, East Azerbaijan province
- Ojaq, a village in Razan County, Hamadan province
