= Qeshlaq-e Agh Laqan =

Qeshlaq-e Agh Laqan قشلاق اغلاقان
- Village
- Location within Iran
- Coordinates: 39°09′35″N 47°28′51″E
- Country: Iran
- Province: East Azerbaijan
- County: Kaleybar
- Bakhsh: Abish Ahmad
- Rural District: Abish Ahmad

Population (2006)
  - Total: 32
- Time zone: UTC+3:30 (IRST)
  - Summer (DST): UTC+4:30 (IRDT)

Qeshlaq-e Agh Laqan (Persian: قشلاق اغلاقان, also Romanized as Qeshlāq-e Āgh Lāqān; also known as Āghlāqān) is a village in Abish Ahmad Rural District, Abish Ahmad District, Kaleybar County, East Azerbaijan Province, Iran. At the 2006 census, its population was 32, in 7 families.
