= Qeshlaq-e Akhmud =

Qeshlaq-e Akhmud (Persian: قشلاق اخمود) may refer to:

- Qeshlaq-e Akhmud-e Olya
- Qeshlaq-e Akhmud-e Sofla
- Qeshlaq-e Akhmud-e Vosta
