= Qeshlaq-e Qara Khanlu =

Qeshlaq-e Qara Khanlu قشلاق قراخانلو
- Village
- Country: Iran
- Province: East Azerbaijan
- County: Kaleybar
- Bakhsh: Abish Ahmad
- Rural District: Qeshlaq

Population (2006)
  - Total: 31
- Time zone: UTC+3:30 (IRST)
  - Summer (DST): UTC+4:30 (IRDT)

Qeshlaq-e Qara Khanlu (Persian: قشلاق قراخانلو, also romanized as Qeshlāq-e Qarā Khānlū; also known as Kahlī Qarah Khānlū) is a village in Qeshlaq Rural District, Abish Ahmad District, Kaleybar County, East Azerbaijan Province, Iran. At the 2006 census, its population was 31, in 9 families.
