= Ali Kalbi =

Ali Kalbi علي كلبي
- Village
- Country: Iran
- Province: East Azerbaijan
- County: Kaleybar
- Bakhsh: Abish Ahmad
- Rural District: Qeshlaq

Population (2006)
  - Total: 33
- Time zone: UTC+3:30 (IRST)
  - Summer (DST): UTC+4:30 (IRDT)

Ali Kalbi (Persian: علي كلبي, also Romanized as ʿAlī Kalbī; also known as Qeshlāq-e ʿAlī Kalbī) is a village in Qeshlaq Rural District, Abish Ahmad District, Kaleybar County, East Azerbaijan Province, Iran. At the 2006 census, its population was 33, in 7 families.
