= Qeshlaq-e Qaneh =

Qeshlaq-e Qaneh قشلاق قانه
- Village
- Location within Iran
- Coordinates: 39°05′51″N 47°29′43″E
- Country: Iran
- Province: East Azerbaijan
- County: Kaleybar
- Bakhsh: Abish Ahmad
- Rural District: Abish Ahmad

Population (2006)
  - Total: 29
- Time zone: UTC+3:30 (IRST)
  - Summer (DST): UTC+4:30 (IRDT)

Qeshlaq-e Qaneh (Persian: قشلاق قانه, also Romanized as Qeshlāq-e Qāneh; also known as Qeshlāq-e Qānlī Qūzī) is a village in Abish Ahmad Rural District, Abish Ahmad District, Kaleybar County, East Azerbaijan Province, Iran. At the 2006 census, its population was 29, in 5 families.
