= Pirlar-e Sofla =

Pirlar-e Sofla پيرلرسفلي
- Village
- Location within Iran
- Coordinates: 39°03′29″N 47°10′28″E
- Country: Iran
- Province: East Azerbaijan
- County: Kaleybar
- Bakhsh: Abish Ahmad
- Rural District: Seyyedan

Population (2006)
  - Total: 255
- Time zone: UTC+3:30 (IRST)
  - Summer (DST): UTC+4:30 (IRDT)

Pirlar-e Sofla (Persian: پيرلرسفلي, also Romanized as Pīrlar-e Soflá; also known as Pīrlar-e Pā'īn) is a village in Seyyedan Rural District, Abish Ahmad District, Kaleybar County, East Azerbaijan Province, Iran. At the 2006 census, its population was 255, in 50 families.
