= Pireh Mashan =

Pireh Mashan پيره ماشان
- Village
- Location within Iran
- Coordinates: 38°57′53″N 47°08′50″E
- Country: Iran
- Province: East Azerbaijan
- County: Kaleybar
- Bakhsh: Abish Ahmad
- Rural District: Seyyedan

Population (2006)
  - Total: 103
- Time zone: UTC+3:30 (IRST)
  - Summer (DST): UTC+4:30 (IRDT)

Pireh Mashan (Persian: پيره ماشان, also Romanized as Pīreh Māshān; also known as Perah Bāshān, Pereh Bāshān, and Pīrāmāshān) is a village in Seyyedan Rural District, Abish Ahmad District, Kaleybar County, East Azerbaijan Province, Iran. At the 2006 census, its population was 103, in 28 families.
