= Abd ol Razzaq, East Azerbaijan =

Abd ol Razzaq عبدالرزاق
- Village
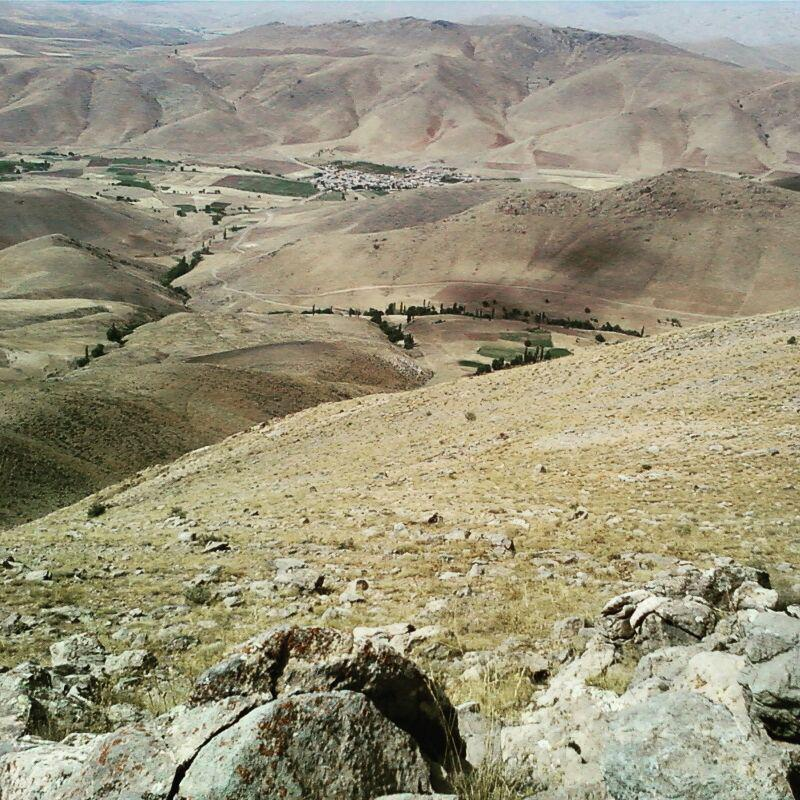

- Location within Iran
- Coordinates: 39°02′32″N 47°11′20″E
- Country: Iran
- Province: East Azerbaijan
- County: Kaleybar
- Bakhsh: Abish Ahmad
- Rural District: Seyyedan

Population (2006)
  - Total: 321
- Time zone: UTC+3:30 (IRST)
  - Summer (DST): UTC+4:30 (IRDT)

Abd ol Razzaq (Persian: عبدالرزاق, also Romanized as ‘Abd ol Razzāq and ‘Abd or Razzāq) is a village in Seyyedan Rural District, Abish Ahmad District, Kaleybar County, East Azerbaijan Province, Iran. At the 2006 census, its population was 321, in 72 families. The village is populated by the Kurdish Chalabianlu tribe.
