= Sheykhlan-e Sofla =

Sheykhlan-e Sofla شيخلان سفلي
- Village
- Location within Iran
- Coordinates: 39°03′34″N 47°15′50″E
- Country: Iran
- Province: East Azerbaijan
- County: Kaleybar
- Bakhsh: Abish Ahmad
- Rural District: Abish Ahmad

Population (2006)
  - Total: 323
- Time zone: UTC+3:30 (IRST)
  - Summer (DST): UTC+4:30 (IRDT)

Sheykhlan-e Sofla (Persian: شيخلان سفلي, also Romanized as Sheykhlān-e Soflá; also known as Sheykhlān-e Pā'īn) is a village in Abish Ahmad Rural District, Abish Ahmad District, Kaleybar County, East Azerbaijan Province, Iran. At the 2006 census, its population was 323, in 83 families.
