= Kahelqu =

Kahelqu كهل قو
- Village
- Country: Iran
- Province: East Azerbaijan
- County: Kaleybar
- Bakhsh: Abish Ahmad
- Rural District: Qeshlaq

Population (2006)
  - Total: 128
- Time zone: UTC+3:30 (IRST)
  - Summer (DST): UTC+4:30 (IRDT)

Kahelqu (Persian: كهل قو, also Romanized as Kahelqū; also known as Bābā Qeshlāqī-ye Chūbānlār) is a village in Qeshlaq Rural District, Abish Ahmad District, Kaleybar County, East Azerbaijan Province, Iran. At the 2006 census, its population was 128, in 28 families.
