= Qeshlaq-e Darchin =

Qeshlaq-e Darchin قشلاق دارچين
- Village
- Location within Iran
- Coordinates: 39°06′49″N 47°27′56″E
- Country: Iran
- Province: East Azerbaijan
- County: Kaleybar
- Bakhsh: Abish Ahmad
- Rural District: Abish Ahmad

Population (2006)
  - Total: 86
- Time zone: UTC+3:30 (IRST)
  - Summer (DST): UTC+4:30 (IRDT)

Qeshlaq-e Darchin (Persian: قشلاق دارچين, also Romanized as Qeshlāq-e Dārchīn; also known as Dārjīn) is a village in Abish Ahmad Rural District, Abish Ahmad District, Kaleybar County, East Azerbaijan Province, Iran. At the 2006 census, its population was 86, in 16 families.
