= Owzun Qayah =

Owzun Qayah اوزون قيه
- Village
- Location within Iran
- Coordinates: 39°11′27″N 47°22′48″E
- Country: Iran
- Province: East Azerbaijan
- County: Kaleybar
- Bakhsh: Abish Ahmad
- Rural District: Qeshlaq

Population (2006)
  - Total: 115
- Time zone: UTC+3:30 (IRST)
  - Summer (DST): UTC+4:30 (IRDT)

Owzun Qayah (Persian: اوزون قيه, also Romanized as Owzūn Qayah) is a village in Qeshlaq Rural District, Abish Ahmad District, Kaleybar County, East Azerbaijan Province, Iran. At the 2006 census, its population was 115, in 22 families.
