= Ojaq Kandi =

Ojaq Kandi (Persian: اجاق كندي) may refer to:

- Ojaq Kandi, Hashtrud
- Ojaq Kandi, Khoda Afarin
- Ojaq Kandi, Minjavan, Khoda Afarin County
