= Salah Payahs =

Salah Payahs صلاح پيه س
- Village
- Location within Iran
- Coordinates: 39°01′34″N 47°17′40″E
- Country: Iran
- Province: East Azerbaijan
- County: Kaleybar
- Bakhsh: Abish Ahmad
- Rural District: Abish Ahmad

Population (2006)
  - Total: 177
- Time zone: UTC+3:30 (IRST)
  - Summer (DST): UTC+4:30 (IRDT)

Salah Payahs (Persian: صلاح پيه س, also Romanized as Şalāḩ Payahs; also known as Şalāḩ Payahsī) is a village in Abish Ahmad Rural District, Abish Ahmad District, Kaleybar County, East Azerbaijan Province, Iran. At the 2006 census, its population was 177, in 33 families.
