= Qarah Daraq =

Qarah Daraq (Persian: قره درق) may refer to:

- Qarah Daraq-e Olya (disambiguation)
- Qarah Daraq-e Sofla
- Qarah Daraq-e Vosta
