= Qeshlaq-e Nareh Kesh =

Qeshlaq-e Nareh Kesh قشلاق نره كش
- Village
- Location within Iran
- Coordinates: 39°12′08″N 47°20′52″E
- Country: Iran
- Province: East Azerbaijan
- County: Kaleybar
- Bakhsh: Abish Ahmad
- Rural District: Qeshlaq

Population (2006)
  - Total: 88
- Time zone: UTC+3:30 (IRST)
  - Summer (DST): UTC+4:30 (IRDT)

Qeshlaq-e Nareh Kesh (Persian: قشلاق نره كش, also Romanized as Qeshlāq-e Nareh Kesh; also known as Na‘reh Kesh) is a village in Qeshlaq Rural District, Abish Ahmad District, Kaleybar County, East Azerbaijan Province, Iran. At the 2006 census, its population was 88, in 19 families.
