= Sheykhlan-e Olya =

Sheykhlan-e Olya شيخلان عليا
- Village
- Location within Iran
- Coordinates: 39°03′14″N 47°16′04″E
- Country: Iran
- Province: East Azerbaijan
- County: Kaleybar
- Bakhsh: Abish Ahmad
- Rural District: Abish Ahmad

Population (2006)
  - Total: 149
- Time zone: UTC+3:30 (IRST)
  - Summer (DST): UTC+4:30 (IRDT)

Sheykhlan-e Olya (Persian: شيخلان عليا, also Romanized as Sheykhlān-e ‘Olyā; also known as Sheykhlān-e Bālā) is a village in Abish Ahmad Rural District, Abish Ahmad District, Kaleybar County, East Azerbaijan Province, Iran. At the 2006 census, its population was 149, in 40 families.
