= Jigh Jigh =

Jigh Jigh جيغ جيغ
- Village
- Location within Iran
- Coordinates: 39°09′53″N 47°17′33″E
- Country: Iran
- Province: East Azerbaijan
- County: Kaleybar
- Bakhsh: Abish Ahmad
- Rural District: Qeshlaq

Population (2006)
  - Total: 79
- Time zone: UTC+3:30 (IRST)
  - Summer (DST): UTC+4:30 (IRDT)

Jigh Jigh (Persian: جيغ جيغ, also Romanized as Jīgh Jīgh; also known as Jīq Jīq and Qeshlāq-e Jīgh Jīgh) is a village in Qeshlaq Rural District, Abish Ahmad District, Kaleybar County, East Azerbaijan Province, Iran. At the 2006 census, its population was 79, in 16 families.
