= Moheb Alilu =

Moheb Alilu محب علي لو
- Village
- Location within Iran
- Coordinates: 39°10′15″N 47°10′24″E
- Country: Iran
- Province: East Azerbaijan
- County: Khoda Afarin
- Bakhsh: Central
- Rural District: Bastamlu

Population (2006)
  - Total: 83
- Time zone: UTC+3:30 (IRST)
  - Summer (DST): UTC+4:30 (IRDT)

Moheb Alilu (Persian: محب علي لو, also Romanized as Moḩeb ‘Alīlū; also known as Moḩeblar) is a village in Bastamlu Rural District, in the Central District of Khoda Afarin County, East Azerbaijan Province, Iran. At the 2006 census, its population was 83, in 19 families. The village is populated by the Kurdish Chalabianlu tribe.
