= Abd ol Razzaq =

Abd ol Razzaq or Abd or Razzaq (Persian: عبدالرزاق) may refer to:

- Abd ol Razzaq, East Azerbaijan
- Abd ol Razzaq, West Azerbaijan
