= Seyyedlar-e Olya =

Seyyedlar-e Olya سيدلرعليا
- Village
- Location within Iran
- Coordinates: 38°59′00″N 47°14′00″E
- Country: Iran
- Province: East Azerbaijan
- County: Kaleybar
- Bakhsh: Abish Ahmad
- Rural District: Seyyedan

Population (2006)
  - Total: 37
- Time zone: UTC+3:30 (IRST)
  - Summer (DST): UTC+4:30 (IRDT)

Seyyedlar-e Olya (Persian: سيدلرعليا, also Romanized as Seyyedlar-e ‘Olyā) is a village in Seyyedan Rural District, Abish Ahmad District, Kaleybar County, East Azerbaijan Province, Iran. At the 2006 census, its population was 37, in nine families.
