= Kavanaq =

Kavanaq كوانق
- Village
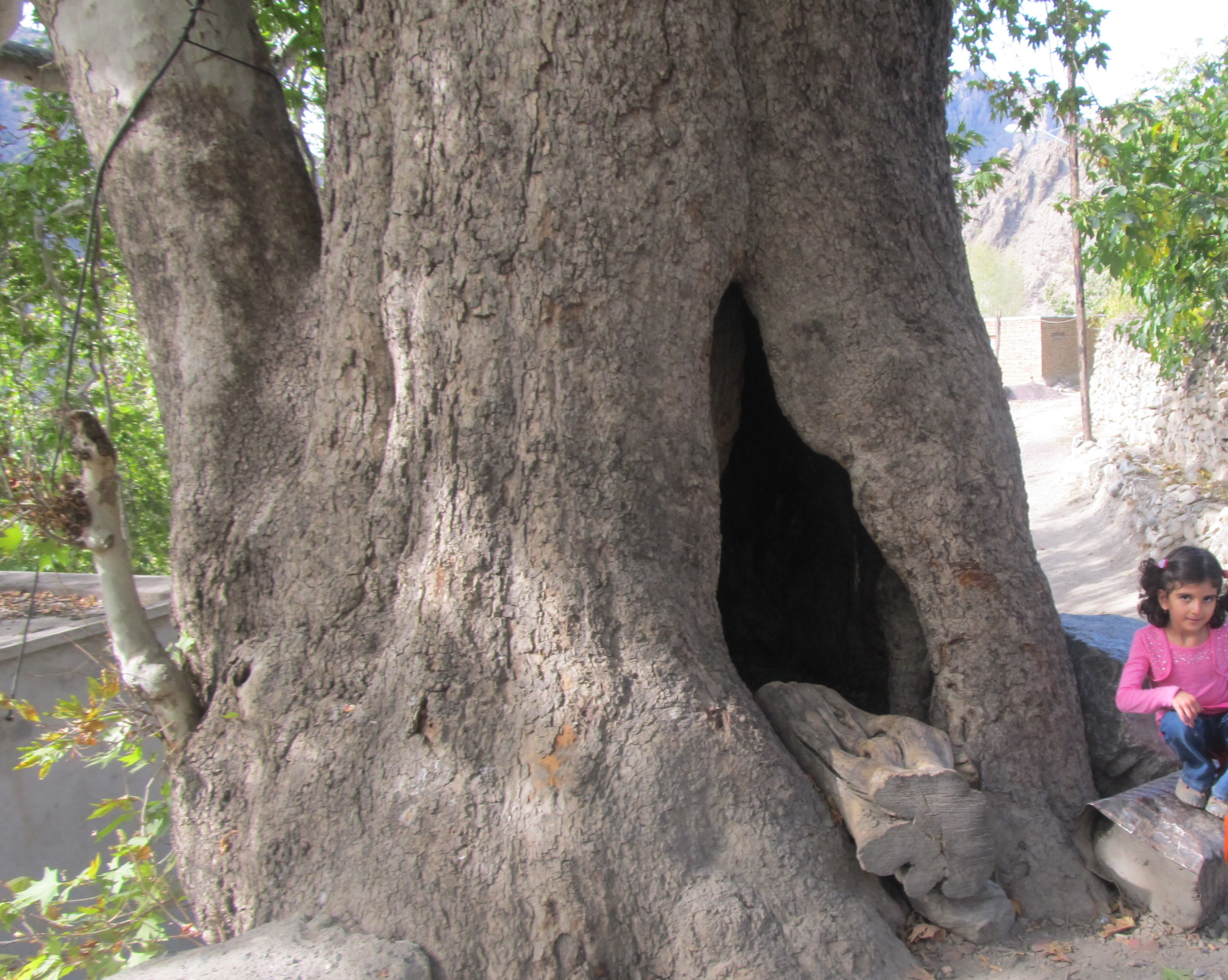
- The landmark ancient plane tree

- Location within Iran
- Coordinates: 38°51′00″N 46°33′03″E
- Country: Iran
- Province: East Azerbaijan
- County: Khoda Afarin
- Bakhsh: Minjavan
- Rural District: Dizmar-e Sharqi

Population (2006)
  - Total: 81
- Time zone: UTC+3:30 (IRST)
  - Summer (DST): UTC+4:30 (IRDT)

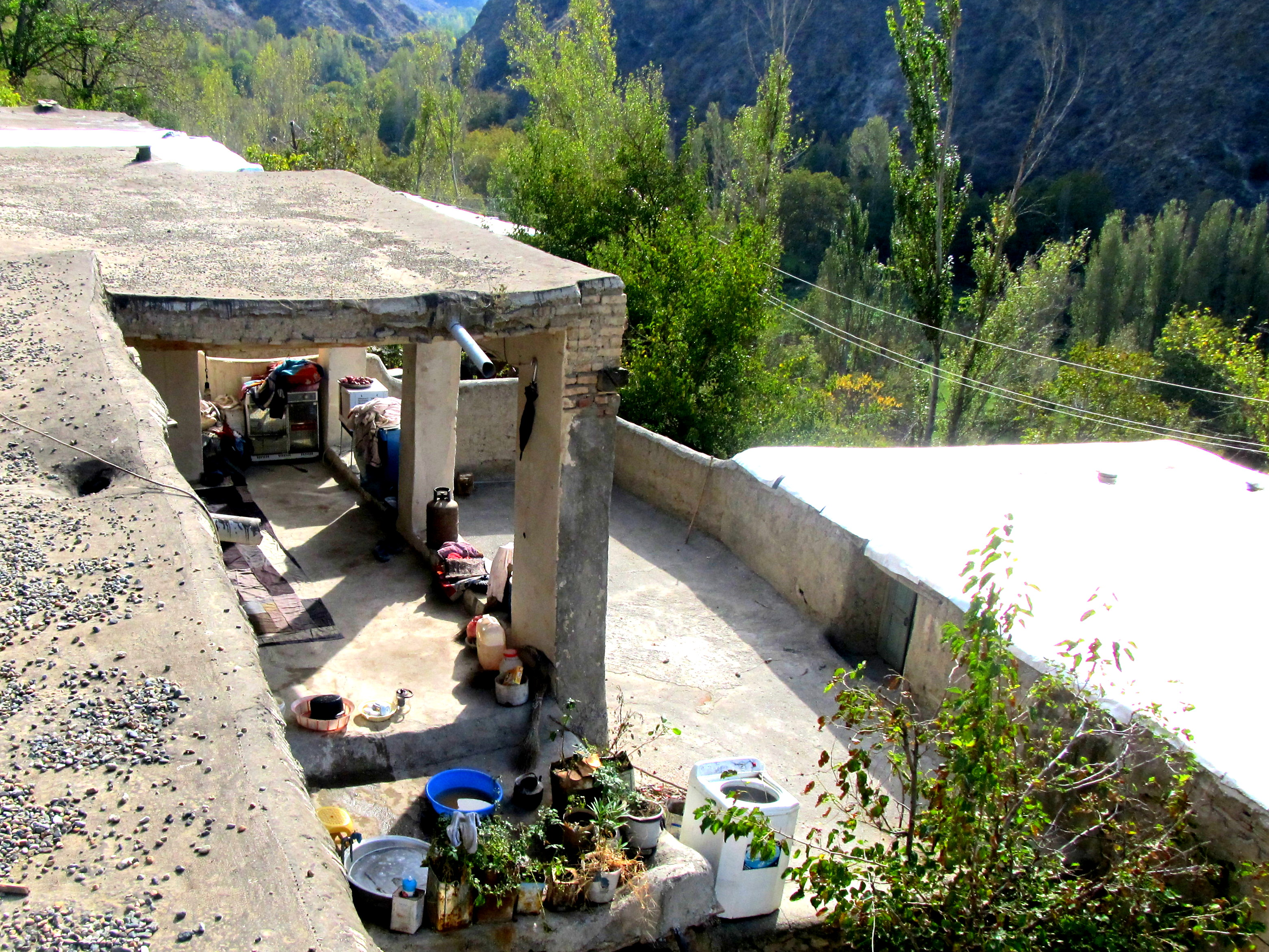
An old fashioned house

Kavanaq (Persian: کوانق, also Romanized as Kavānaq; also known as Kavānagh, Kavānd, Kavānī, Kavānīq, Kevāni, and Kevany) is a village in Dizmar-e Sharqi Rural District, Minjavan District, Khoda Afarin County, East Azerbaijan Province, Iran. At the 2006 census, its population was 81, in 21 families. According to more recent statistics the population is 94 people in 22 families.

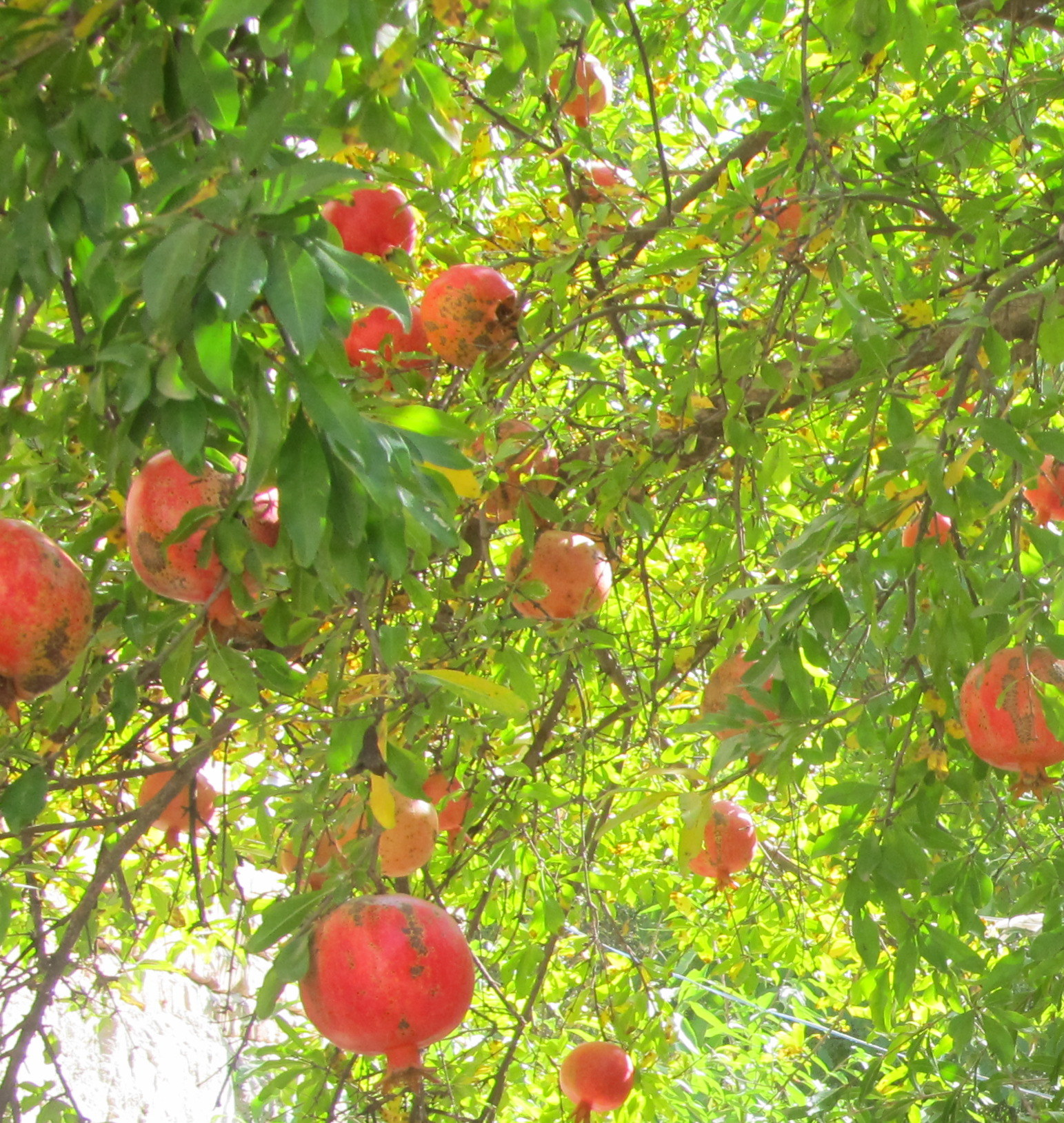
Gülabsha Pomegranate tree of the village orchards.

== Economy ==
The village is a renowned center of pomegranate and grape production in the Arasbaran region. These produces have a characteristic potential of being preserved for over six months without requiring refrigeration. This feature was remarked by Robert Mignan, who traveled through Arasbaran in 1830s. Kavanaq is also remarked for its thriving apiculture operation.

== Further Information ==
- The first allusion to Kavanaq is by the renowned historian Hamdallah Mustawfi in the late twelfth century.
- On a mountain near the village, there is a castle dating from Sasanian era. It was used as a jail for high-ranking officials during Khwarazmian reign. The castle is known as the castle of Mardanaqom.
- There is a landmark ancient plane tree in the village. The tree is about 3 meter in diameter and is said to have lived for 500 years.
