= Aliverdi Owshaqi =

Village in East Azerbaijan province, Iran

Aliverdi Owshaqi Persian: عليوردي اوشاقي
- Village
- Location within Iran
- Coordinates: 39°13′39″N 47°09′15″E
- Country: Iran
- Province: East Azerbaijan
- County: Khoda Afarin
- District: Central
- Rural District: Bastamlu

Population (2016)
  - Total: 675
- Time zone: UTC+3:30 (IRST)

Aliverdi Owshaqi (Persian: عليوردي اوشاقي) (Note: Also romanized as ‘Alīverdī Owshāqī; also known as ‘Alī Verdī Ūshāghī) is a village in Bastamlu Rural District of the Central District in Khoda Afarin County, East Azerbaijan province, Iran.

== Demographics ==
=== Ethnicity ===
The village is populated by the Kurdish Chalabianlu tribe.

=== Population ===
At the time of the 2006 National Census, the village's population was 720 in 160 households, when it was in the former Khoda Afarin District of Kaleybar County. The following census in 2011 counted 749 people in 183 households, by which time the district had been separated from the county in the establishment of Khoda Afarin County. The rural district was transferred to the new Central District. The 2016 census measured the population of the village as 675 people in 199 households. It was the most populous village in its rural district.
