= Qushchi (disambiguation) =

Qushchi is a city in West Azerbaijan Province, Iran.

Qushchi (Persian: قوشچي) may also refer to:

- Qushchi, Kaleybar, East Azerbaijan Province
- Qushchi, Sarab, East Azerbaijan Province
- Qushchi Bayram Khvajeh, East Azerbaijan Province
- Qushchi, Qazvin
- Qushchi, Zanjan
