= Shoja Khanlu =

Shoja Khanlu شجاع خانلو
- Village
- Location within Iran
- Coordinates: 39°13′01″N 47°11′03″E
- Country: Iran
- Province: East Azerbaijan
- County: Khoda Afarin
- Bakhsh: Central
- Rural District: Bastamlu

Population (2006)
  - Total: 150
- Time zone: UTC+3:30 (IRST)
  - Summer (DST): UTC+4:30 (IRDT)

Shoja Khanlu (Persian: شجاع خانلو, also Romanized as Shojā‘ Khānlū) is a village in Bastamlu Rural District, in the Central District of Khoda Afarin County, East Azerbaijan Province, Iran. At the 2006 census, its population was 150, in 33 families. The village is populated by the Kurdish Chalabianlu tribe.
