= Delavaran =

Village in East Azerbaijan province, Iran

Delavaran Persian: دلاوران
- Village
- Location within Iran
- Coordinates: 39°06′23″N 47°17′25″E
- Country: Iran
- Province: East Azerbaijan
- County: Kaleybar
- District: Abesh Ahmad
- Rural District: Abesh Ahmad

Population (2016)
  - Total: 768
- Time zone: UTC+3:30 (IRST)

Delavaran (Persian: دلاوران) (Note: Formerly known as Dil Bilmaz (ديل بيلمز), also romanized as Dīl Bīlmaz; also known as Del Bīlmaz, Dīl Bīlmen, and Dīl Būlmaz) is a village in Abesh Ahmad Rural District of Abesh Ahmad District in Kaleybar County, East Azerbaijan province, Iran.

== Demographics ==
=== Population ===
At the time of the 2006 National Census, the village's population (as Dil Bilmaz) was 839 in 176 households. The following census in 2011 counted 805 people in 190 households, by which time the village had been renamed Delavaran. The 2016 census measured the population of the village as 768 people in 211 households.

The village is populated by the Kurdish Chalabianlu tribe.
