= Ayri Bujaq =

Village in East Azerbaijan province, Iran

Ayri Bujaq Persian: ايري بوجاق
- Village
- Location within Iran
- Coordinates: 39°21′11″N 47°19′59″E
- Country: Iran
- Province: East Azerbaijan
- County: Khoda Afarin
- District: Garamduz
- Rural District: Garamduz-e Sharqi

Population (2016)
  - Total: 374
- Time zone: UTC+3:30 (IRST)

Ayri Bujaq (Persian: ايري بوجاق) (Note: Also romanized as Ayrī Būjāq and Īrī Būjāq; also known as Ayrī Būjāq Beyglū) is a village in Garamduz-e Sharqi Rural District of Garamduz District in Khoda Afarin County, East Azerbaijan province, Iran.

== Demographics ==
=== Ethnicity ===
The village is populated by the Kurdish Chalabianlu tribe.

=== Population ===
At the time of the 2006 National Census, the village's population was 336 in 73 households, when it was in Garamduz Rural District (Note: Renamed Garamduz-e Gharbi Rural District) of the former Khoda Afarin District in Kaleybar County. The following census in 2011 counted 340 people in 80 households, by which time the district had been separated from the county in the establishment of Khoda Afarin County. The rural district was transferred to the new Garamduz District and renamed Garamduz-e Gharbi Rural District. Ayri Bujaq was transferred to Garamduz-e Sharqi Rural District created in the district. The 2016 census measured the population of the village as 374 people in 109 households.
