= Balan, Abish Ahmad =

Village in East Azerbaijan province, Iran

Balan Persian: بالان
- Village
- Location within Iran
- Coordinates: 39°01′14″N 47°13′34″E
- Country: Iran
- Province: East Azerbaijan
- County: Kaleybar
- District: Abesh Ahmad
- Rural District: Seyyedan

Population (2016)
  - Total: 245
- Time zone: UTC+3:30 (IRST)

Balan (Persian: بالان) (Note: Also romanized as Bālān) is a village in Seyyedan Rural District of Abesh Ahmad District in Kaleybar County, East Azerbaijan province, Iran.

== Demographics ==
=== Population ===
At the time of the 2006 National Census, the village's population was 413 in 90 households. The following census in 2011 counted 250 people in 73 households. The 2016 census measured the population of the village as 245 people in 79 households.
