= Atalu =

Atalu عطالو
- Village
- Location within Iran
- Coordinates: 39°12′09″N 47°08′14″E
- Country: Iran
- Province: East Azerbaijan
- County: Khoda Afarin
- Bakhsh: Central
- Rural District: Bastamlu

Population (2006)
  - Total: 85
- Time zone: UTC+3:30 (IRST)
  - Summer (DST): UTC+4:30 (IRDT)

Atalu (Persian: عطالو, also Romanized as ‘Aţālū) is a village in Bastamlu Rural District, in the Central District of Khoda Afarin County, East Azerbaijan Province, Iran. At the 2006 census, its population was 85, in 19 families. The village is populated by the Kurdish Chalabianlu tribe.
