= Qeshlaq-e Luleh Darreh Hajj Meyn Bashi =

Qeshlaq-e Luleh Darreh Hajj Meyn Bashi (Persian: قشلاق لوله دره حاج مين باشي) may refer to:

- Qeshlaq-e Luleh Darreh Hajj Meyn Bashi-ye Olya
- Qeshlaq-e Luleh Darreh Hajj Meyn Bashi-ye Sofla
