= Qarah Vanlu =

Village in East Azerbaijan province, Iran

Qarah Vanlu Persian: قره وانلو
- Village
- Location within Iran
- Coordinates: 39°05′52″N 47°21′01″E
- Country: Iran
- Province: East Azerbaijan
- County: Kaleybar
- District: Abesh Ahmad
- Rural District: Qeshlaq

Population (2016)
  - Total: 474
- Time zone: UTC+3:30 (IRST)

Qarah Vanlu (Persian: قره وانلو) (Note: Also romanized as Qarah Vānlū; also known as Qarah Bāghlū and Qareh Dāghlū) is a village in Qeshlaq Rural District of Abesh Ahmad District in Kaleybar County, East Azerbaijan province, Iran.

== Demographics ==
=== Population ===
At the time of the 2006 National Census, the village's population was 561 in 128 households. The following census in 2011 counted 524 people in 139 households. The 2016 census measured the population of the village as 474 people in 144 households.
