= Aqamirlu, Kaleybar =

Village in East Azerbaijan province, Iran

Aqamirlu Persian: اقاميرلو
- Village
- Location within Iran
- Coordinates: 39°01′13″N 47°13′51″E
- Country: Iran
- Province: East Azerbaijan
- County: Kaleybar
- District: Abesh Ahmad
- Rural District: Seyyedan

Population (2016)
  - Total: 274
- Time zone: UTC+3:30 (IRST)

Aqamirlu (Persian: اقاميرلو) (Note: Also romanized as Āqāmīrlū; also known as Āghāmīrlū) is a village in Seyyedan Rural District of Abesh Ahmad District in Kaleybar County, East Azerbaijan province, Iran.

== Demographics ==
=== Population ===
At the time of the 2006 National Census, the village's population was 349 in 71 households. The following census in 2011 counted 271 people in 77 households. The 2016 census measured the population of the village as 274 people in 84 households.
