= Qoli Beyglu, East Azerbaijan =

Village in East Azerbaijan province, Iran

Qoli Beyglu Persian: قلي بيگلو
- Village
- Location within Iran
- Coordinates: 39°15′36″N 47°06′07″E
- Country: Iran
- Province: East Azerbaijan
- County: Khoda Afarin
- District: Central
- Rural District: Bastamlu

Population (2016)
  - Total: 317
- Time zone: UTC+3:30 (IRST)

Qoli Beyglu (Persian: قلي بيگلو) (Note: Also romanized as Qolī Beyglū; also known as Qolī Beyglū-ye Kadkhodālū (قلي بيگلو کدخدالو)) is a village in Bastamlu Rural District of the Central District in Khoda Afarin County, East Azerbaijan province, Iran.

== Demographics ==
=== Ethnicity ===
The village is populated by the Kurdish Chalabianlu tribe.

=== Population ===
At the time of the 2006 National Census, the village's population was 543 in 92 households, when it was in the former Khoda Afarin District of Kaleybar County. The following census in 2011 counted 567 people in 142 households, by which time the district had been separated from the county in the establishment of Khoda Afarin County. The rural district was transferred to the new Central District. The 2016 census measured the population of the village as 317 people in 100 households.
