= Qaleh Kandi, Kaleybar =

Village in East Azerbaijan province, Iran

Qaleh Kandi Persian: قلعه كندي
- Village
- Location within Iran
- Coordinates: 39°01′05″N 47°15′36″E
- Country: Iran
- Province: East Azerbaijan
- County: Kaleybar
- District: Abesh Ahmad
- Rural District: Abesh Ahmad

Population (2016)
  - Total: 936
- Time zone: UTC+3:30 (IRST)

Qaleh Kandi (Persian: قلعه كندي) (Note: Also romanized as Qal’eh Kandī and Qal‘eh Kandī) is a village in Abesh Ahmad Rural District of Abesh Ahmad District in Kaleybar County, East Azerbaijan province, Iran.

== Demographics ==
=== Population ===
At the time of the 2006 National Census, the village's population was 817 in 193 households. The following census in 2011 counted 986 people in 223 households. The 2016 census measured the population of the village as 936 people in 247 households.
