= Khalan =

Village in East Azerbaijan province, Iran

Khalan Persian: خالان
- Village
- Location within Iran
- Coordinates: 38°59′51″N 47°12′46″E
- Country: Iran
- Province: East Azerbaijan
- County: Kaleybar
- District: Abesh Ahmad
- Rural District: Seyyedan

Population (2016)
  - Total: 221
- Time zone: UTC+3:30 (IRST)

Khalan (Persian: خالان) (Note: Also romanized as Khālān) is a village in Seyyedan Rural District of Abesh Ahmad District in Kaleybar County, East Azerbaijan province, Iran.

== Demographics ==
=== Population ===
At the time of the 2006 National Census, the village's population was 602 in 123 households. The following census in 2011 counted 447 people in 116 households. The 2016 census measured the population of the village as 221 people in 76 households.
