= Qeshlaq-e Akhmud-e Vosta =

Qeshlaq-e Akhmud-e Vosta قشلاق اخمودوسطي
- Village
- Country: Iran
- Province: East Azerbaijan
- County: Kaleybar
- Bakhsh: Abish Ahmad
- Rural District: Qeshlaq

Population (2006)
  - Total: 64
- Time zone: UTC+3:30 (IRST)
  - Summer (DST): UTC+4:30 (IRDT)

Qeshlaq-e Akhmud-e Vosta (Persian: قشلاق اخمودوسطي, also Romanized as Qeshlāq-e Akhmūd-e Vosţá) is a village in Qeshlaq Rural District, Abish Ahmad District, Kaleybar County, East Azerbaijan Province, Iran. At the 2006 census, its population was 64, in 15 families.
