= Qeshlaq-e Akhmud-e Sofla =

Qeshlaq-e Akhmud-e Sofla قشلاق اخمودسفلي
- Village
- Country: Iran
- Province: East Azerbaijan
- County: Kaleybar
- Bakhsh: Abish Ahmad
- Rural District: Qeshlaq

Population (2006)
  - Total: 38
- Time zone: UTC+3:30 (IRST)
  - Summer (DST): UTC+4:30 (IRDT)

Qeshlaq-e Akhmud-e Sofla (Persian: قشلاق اخمودسفلي, also Romanized as Qeshlāq-e Akhmūd-e Soflá) is a village in Qeshlaq Rural District, Abish Ahmad District, Kaleybar County, East Azerbaijan Province, Iran. At the 2006 census, its population was 38, in 7 families.
