= Qarah Daraq-e Olya-ye Yek =

Qarah Daraq-e Olya-ye Yek قره درق عليا 1
- Village
- Location within Iran
- Coordinates: 39°09′05″N 47°26′59″E
- Country: Iran
- Province: East Azerbaijan
- County: Kaleybar
- Bakhsh: Abish Ahmad
- Rural District: Abish Ahmad

Population (2006)
  - Total: 51
- Time zone: UTC+3:30 (IRST)
  - Summer (DST): UTC+4:30 (IRDT)

Qarah Daraq-e Olya-ye Yek (Persian: قره درق عليا 1, also Romanized as Qarah Daraq-e ‘Olyā-ye Yek; also known asBāsh Qarah Darreh and Qarah Daraq-e ‘Olyā) is a village in Abish Ahmad Rural District, Abish Ahmad District, Kaleybar County, East Azerbaijan Province, Iran. At the 2006 census, its population was 51, in 12 families.
