= Seyyedlar-e Sofla =

Seyyedlar-e Sofla سيدلرسفلي
- village
- Location within Iran
- Country: Iran
- Province: East Azerbaijan
- County: Kaleybar
- Bakhsh: Abish Ahmad
- Rural District: Seyyedan

Population (2006)
  - Total: 209
- Time zone: UTC+3:30 (IRST)
  - Summer (DST): UTC+4:30 (IRDT)

Seyyedlar-e Sofla (Persian: سيدلرسفلي, also Romanized as Seyyedlar-e Soflá; also known as Seyyedlar-e Pā’īn) is a village in Seyyedan Rural District, Abish Ahmad District, Kaleybar County, East Azerbaijan Province, Iran. At the 2006 census, its population was 209, in 38 families.
