= Kalantar, East Azerbaijan =

Village in East Azerbaijan province, Iran

Kalantar Persian: كلانتر
- Village
- Location within Iran
- Coordinates: 39°03′58″N 47°19′59″E
- Country: Iran
- Province: East Azerbaijan
- County: Kaleybar
- District: Abesh Ahmad
- Rural District: Abesh Ahmad

Population (2016)
  - Total: 608
- Time zone: UTC+3:30 (IRST)

Kalantar (Persian: كلانتر) (Note: Also romanized as Kalāntar) is a village in Abesh Ahmad Rural District of Abesh Ahmad District in Kaleybar County, East Azerbaijan province, Iran.

== Demographics ==
=== Population ===
At the time of the 2006 National Census, the village's population was 800 in 176 households. The following census in 2011 counted 712 people in 164 households. The 2016 census measured the population of the village as 608 people in 173 households.
