= Haddadan =

Village in East Azerbaijan province, Iran

Haddadan Persian: حدادان
- Village
- Location within Iran
- Coordinates: 39°01′45″N 47°12′36″E
- Country: Iran
- Province: East Azerbaijan
- County: Kaleybar
- District: Abesh Ahmad
- Rural District: Seyyedan

Population (2016)
  - Total: 402
- Time zone: UTC+3:30 (IRST)

Haddadan (Persian: حدادان) (Note: Also romanized as Ḩaddādan; also known as Haddadan Garmadooz) is a village in Seyyedan Rural District of Abesh Ahmad District in Kaleybar County, East Azerbaijan province, Iran.

== Demographics ==
=== Population ===
At the time of the 2006 National Census, the village's population was 629 in 152 households. The following census in 2011 counted 394 people in 124 households. The 2016 census measured the population of the village as 402 people in 139 households.
