= Shamlu (disambiguation) =

Shamlu is a Turkic tribe in Iran.

Shamlu (Persian: شاملو) may also refer to:

- Shamlu, East Azerbaijan
- Shamlu-ye Bozorg, East Azerbaijan Province
- Shamlu-ye Kuchak, East Azerbaijan Province
- Shamlu, Fars
