= Dil Bilmaz =

Dil Bilmaz or Dilbilmaz (Persian: ديل بيلمز) may refer to:

- Dil Bilmaz, East Azerbaijan
- Dilbilmaz, West Azerbaijan
