= Qarah Qayah, Kaleybar =

Village in East Azerbaijan province, Iran

Qarah Qayah Persian: قره قيه
- Village
- Location within Iran
- Coordinates: 39°12′15″N 47°20′49″E
- Country: Iran
- Province: East Azerbaijan
- County: Kaleybar
- District: Abesh Ahmad
- Rural District: Qeshlaq

Population (2016)
  - Total: 714
- Time zone: UTC+3:30 (IRST)

Qarah Qayah (Persian: قره قيه) is a village in, and the capital of, Qeshlaq Rural District in Abesh Ahmad District of Kaleybar County, East Azerbaijan province, Iran.

== Demographics ==
=== Population ===
At the time of the 2006 National Census, the village's population was 649 in 137 households. The following census in 2011 counted 719 people in 167 households. The 2016 census measured the population of the village as 714 people in 208 households. It was the most populous village in its rural district.
