= Asbhar =

Asbhar (Persian: اسبهار) may refer to:

- Asbhar-e Olya
- Asbhar-e Sofla
