= Qeshlaq-e Gazlu =

Qeshlaq-e Gazlu (Persian: قشلاق گازلو) may refer to:

- Qeshlaq-e Gazlu Hajji Mohammad
- Qeshlaq-e Gazlu Hajji Yunes
