= Yeli-ye Olya =

Yeli-ye Olya يلي عليا
- Village
- Location within Iran
- Coordinates: 39°13′04″N 47°20′46″E
- Country: Iran
- Province: East Azerbaijan
- County: Kaleybar
- Bakhsh: Abish Ahmad
- Rural District: Qeshlaq

Population (2006)
  - Total: 163
- Time zone: UTC+3:30 (IRST)
  - Summer (DST): UTC+4:30 (IRDT)

Yeli-ye Olya (Persian: يلي عليا, also Romanized as Yelī-ye ‘Olyā; also known as Yelī) is a village in Qeshlaq Rural District, Abish Ahmad District, Kaleybar County, East Azerbaijan Province, Iran. At the 2006 census, its population was 163, in 35 families.
