= Oti Kandi =

Village in East Azerbaijan province, Iran

Oti Kandi Persian: اتي كندي
- Village
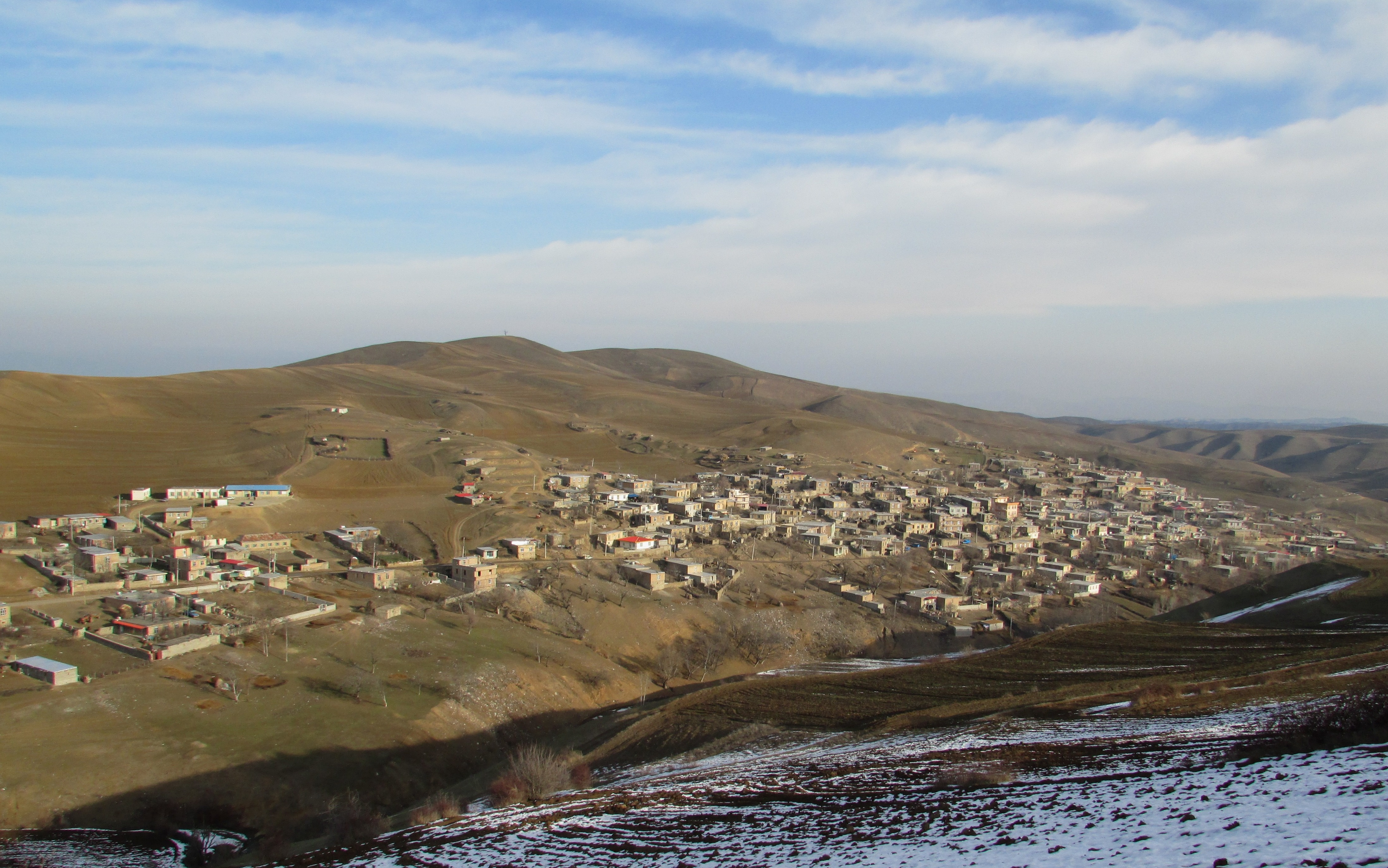
- The village of Oti Kandi in January 2014

- Location within Iran
- Coordinates: 39°02′26″N 47°12′29″E
- Country: Iran
- Province: East Azerbaijan
- County: Kaleybar
- District: Abesh Ahmad
- Rural District: Seyyedan

Population (2016)
  - Total: 791
- Time zone: UTC+3:30 (IRST)

Oti Kandi (Persian: آتی ‌کندی) (Note: Also romanized as Otī Kandī; also known as Owtū Kandī) is a village in, and the capital of, Seyyedan Rural District in Abesh Ahmad District of Kaleybar County, East Azerbaijan province, Iran.

== Demographics ==
=== Population ===
At the time of the 2006 National Census, the village's population was 1,047 in 207 households. The following census in 2011 counted 838 people in 225 households. The 2016 census measured the population of the village as 791 people in 228 households. It was the most populous village in its rural district.
