= Qarah Daraq-e Vosta =

Qarah Daraq-e Vosta قره درق وسطي
- Village
- Location within Iran
- Coordinates: 39°10′12″N 47°26′50″E
- Country: Iran
- Province: East Azerbaijan
- County: Kaleybar
- Bakhsh: Abish Ahmad
- Rural District: Abish Ahmad

Population (2006)
  - Total: 28
- Time zone: UTC+3:30 (IRST)
  - Summer (DST): UTC+4:30 (IRDT)

Qarah Daraq-e Vosta (Persian: قره درق وسطي, also Romanized as Qarah Daraq-e Vosţá; also known as Owrtā Qarah Darreh) is a village in Abish Ahmad Rural District, Abish Ahmad District, Kaleybar County, East Azerbaijan Province, Iran. At the 2006 census, its population was 28, in 7 families.
