= Asbhar-e Sofla =

Asbhar-e Sofla اسبهارسفلي
- Village
- Location within Iran
- Coordinates: 39°08′30″N 47°14′15″E
- Country: Iran
- Province: East Azerbaijan
- County: Kaleybar
- Bakhsh: Abish Ahmad
- Rural District: Qeshlaq

Population (2006)
  - Total: 67
- Time zone: UTC+3:30 (IRST)
  - Summer (DST): UTC+4:30 (IRDT)

Asbhar-e Sofla (Persian: اسبهارسفلي, also Romanized as Asbhār-e Soflá; also known as Asbhār-e Pā’īn and Asbhār-e Qeshlāq-e Pā’īn) is a village in Qeshlaq Rural District, Abish Ahmad District, Kaleybar County, East Azerbaijan Province, Iran. At the 2006 census, its population was 67, in 14 families.
