= Qeshlaq-e Luleh Darreh Hajj Meyn Bashi-ye Sofla =

Qeshlaq-e Luleh Darreh Hajj Meyn Bashi-ye Sofla قشلاق لوله دره حاج مين باشي سفلي
- Village
- Country: Iran
- Province: East Azerbaijan
- County: Kaleybar
- Bakhsh: Abish Ahmad
- Rural District: Abish Ahmad

Population (2006)
  - Total: 33
- Time zone: UTC+3:30 (IRST)
  - Summer (DST): UTC+4:30 (IRDT)

Qeshlaq-e Luleh Darreh Hajj Meyn Bashi-ye Sofla (Persian: قشلاق لوله دره حاج مين باشي سفلي, also Romanized as Qeshlāq-e Lūleh Darreh Ḩājj Meyn Bāshī-ye Soflá) is a village in Abish Ahmad Rural District, Abish Ahmad District, Kaleybar County, East Azerbaijan Province, Iran. At the 2006 census, its population was 33, in 5 families.
