= Hur Moghan =

Hur Moghan or Hoor Moghan (Persian: هورمغان), also rendered as Huri Moghan or Hur Moqan may refer to:

- Hur Moghan-e Olya
- Hur Moghan-e Sofla
