= Shamlu-ye Kuchak =

Shamlu-ye Kuchak شاملوي كوچك
- Village
- Location within Iran
- Coordinates: 39°10′16″N 47°15′58″E
- Country: Iran
- Province: East Azerbaijan
- County: Kaleybar
- Bakhsh: Abish Ahmad
- Rural District: Qeshlaq

Population (2006)
  - Total: 187
- Time zone: UTC+3:30 (IRST)
  - Summer (DST): UTC+4:30 (IRDT)

Shamlu-ye Kuchak (Persian: شاملوي كوچك, also Romanized as Shāmlū-ye Kūchak; also known as Shāmlūy-e Kūchak and Shāmlū-ye Bālā) is a village in Qeshlaq Rural District, Abish Ahmad District, Kaleybar County, East Azerbaijan Province, Iran. At the 2006 census, its population was 187, in 35 families.
