= Alikhanlu =

Alikhanlu علي خانلو
- Village
- Location within Iran
- Coordinates: 39°11′59″N 47°11′10″E
- Country: Iran
- Province: East Azerbaijan
- County: Khoda Afarin
- Bakhsh: Central
- Rural District: Bastamlu

Population (2006)
  - Total: 208
- Time zone: UTC+3:30 (IRST)
  - Summer (DST): UTC+4:30 (IRDT)

Alikhanlu (Persian: علي خانلو, also Romanized as ‘Alīkhānlū) is a village in Bastamlu Rural District, in the Central District of Khoda Afarin County, East Azerbaijan Province, Iran. At the 2006 census, its population was 208, in 36 families. The village is populated by the Kurdish Chalabianlu tribe.
