= Amirabad, Kaleybar =

Village in East Azerbaijan province, Iran

Amirabad Persian: اميراباد
- Village
- Location within Iran
- Coordinates: 39°01′56″N 47°19′21″E
- Country: Iran
- Province: East Azerbaijan
- County: Kaleybar
- District: Abesh Ahmad
- Rural District: Abesh Ahmad

Population (2016)
  - Total: 580
- Time zone: UTC+3:30 (IRST)

Amirabad (Persian: اميراباد) (Note: Also romanized as Amīrābād) is a village in Abesh Ahmad Rural District of Abesh Ahmad District in Kaleybar County, East Azerbaijan province, Iran.

== Demographics ==
=== Population ===
At the time of the 2006 National Census, the village's population was 535 in 104 households. The following census in 2011 counted 537 people in 138 households. The 2016 census measured the population of the village as 580 people in 176 households.
