= Qarah Daraq-e Olya-ye Do =

Qarah Daraq-e Olya-ye Do قره درق عليا2
- Village
- Country: Iran
- Province: East Azerbaijan
- County: Kaleybar
- Bakhsh: Abish Ahmad
- Rural District: Abish Ahmad

Population (2006)
  - Total: 26
- Time zone: UTC+3:30 (IRST)
  - Summer (DST): UTC+4:30 (IRDT)

Qarah Daraq-e Olya-ye Do (Persian: قره درق عليا2, also Romanized as Qarah Daraq-e ‘Olyā-ye Do) is a village in Abish Ahmad Rural District, Abish Ahmad District, Kaleybar County, East Azerbaijan Province, Iran. At the 2006 census, its population was 26, in 4 families.
