= Qush Qayahsi, Kaleybar =

Village in East Azerbaijan province, Iran

Qush Qayahsi Persian: قوش قيه سي
- Village
- Location within Iran
- Coordinates: 39°07′18″N 47°21′29″E
- Country: Iran
- Province: East Azerbaijan
- County: Kaleybar
- District: Abesh Ahmad
- Rural District: Qeshlaq

Population (2016)
  - Total: 489
- Time zone: UTC+3:30 (IRST)

Qush Qayahsi (Persian: قوش قيه سي) (Note: Also romanized as Qūsh Qayahsī; also known as Qūsh Qayah and Qūsh Qayasī) is a village in Qeshlaq Rural District of Abesh Ahmad District in Kaleybar County, East Azerbaijan province, Iran.

== Demographics ==
=== Population ===
At the time of the 2006 National Census, the village's population was 475 in 89 households. The following census in 2011 counted 474 people in 122 households. The 2016 census measured the population of the village as 489 people in 145 households.
