= Oskanluy =

Oskanluy (Persian: اسكانلوي), also rendered as Oskanlu, may refer to:

- Oskanluy-e Olya
- Oskanluy-e Sofla
