= Qeshlaq-e Luleh Darreh Hajj Meyn Bashi-ye Olya =

Qeshlaq-e Luleh Darreh Hajj Meyn Bashi-ye Olya قشلاق لوله دره حاج مين باشي عليا
- Village
- Country: Iran
- Province: East Azerbaijan
- County: Kaleybar
- Bakhsh: Abish Ahmad
- Rural District: Abish Ahmad

Population (2006)
  - Total: 27
- Time zone: UTC+3:30 (IRST)
  - Summer (DST): UTC+4:30 (IRDT)

Qeshlaq-e Luleh Darreh Hajj Meyn Bashi-ye Olya (Persian: قشلاق لوله دره حاج مين باشي عليا, also Romanized as Qeshlāq-e Lūleh Darreh Ḩājj Meyn Bāshī-ye ‘Olyā) is a village in Abish Ahmad Rural District, Abish Ahmad District, Kaleybar County, East Azerbaijan Province, Iran. At the 2006 census, its population was 27, in 6 families.
