= Qeshlaq-e Gazlu Hajji Yunes =

Qeshlaq-e Gazlu Hajji Yunes قشلاق گازلوحاجي يونس
- Village
- Country: Iran
- Province: East Azerbaijan
- County: Kaleybar
- Bakhsh: Abish Ahmad
- Rural District: Qeshlaq

Population (2006)
  - Total: 161
- Time zone: UTC+3:30 (IRST)
  - Summer (DST): UTC+4:30 (IRDT)

Qeshlaq-e Gazlu Hajji Yunes (Persian: قشلاق گازلوحاجي يونس, also Romanized as Qeshlāq-e Gāzlū Ḩājjī Yūnes) is a village in Qeshlaq Rural District, Abish Ahmad District, Kaleybar County, East Azerbaijan Province, Iran. At the 2006 census, its population was 161, in 33 families.
