= Yeli =

Yeli (Persian: يلي) may refer to:

- Yeli, India, a village, List of villages in Pathardi taluka, in Pathardi taluka, Ahmednagar district, Maharashtra State, India
- Yeli-ye Olya
- Yeli-ye Sofla
