= Dowrmishkhanlu =

Village in East Azerbaijan province, Iran

Dowrmishkhanlu Persian: دورميشكانلو
- Village
- Location within Iran
- Coordinates: 39°10′29″N 47°07′52″E
- Country: Iran
- Province: East Azerbaijan
- County: Khoda Afarin
- District: Central
- Rural District: Bastamlu

Population (2016)
  - Total: 297
- Time zone: UTC+3:30 (IRST)

Dowrmishkhanlu (Persian: دورميشكانلو) (Note: Also romanized as Dowrmīshkhānlū; also known as Dormīshkānlū) is a village in Bastamlu Rural District of the Central District in Khoda Afarin County, East Azerbaijan province, Iran.

== Demographics ==
=== Ethnicity ===
The village is populated by the Kurdish Chalabianlu tribe.

=== Population ===
At the time of the 2006 National Census, the village's population was 481 in 98 households, when it was in the former Khoda Afarin District of Kaleybar County. The following census in 2011 counted 398 people in 105 households, by which time the district had been separated from the county in the establishment of Khoda Afarin County. The rural district was transferred to the new Central District. The 2016 census measured the population of the village as 297 people in 94 households.
