= Qarah Daraq-e Sofla =

Qarah Daraq-e Sofla قره درق سفلي
- Village
- Location within Iran
- Coordinates: 39°12′00″N 47°28′00″E
- Country: Iran
- Province: East Azerbaijan
- County: Kaleybar
- Bakhsh: Abish Ahmad
- Rural District: Abish Ahmad

Population (2006)
  - Total: 141
- Time zone: UTC+3:30 (IRST)
  - Summer (DST): UTC+4:30 (IRDT)

Qarah Daraq-e Sofla (Persian: قره درق سفلي, also Romanized as Qarah Daraq-e Soflá) is a village in Abish Ahmad Rural District, Abish Ahmad District, Kaleybar County, East Azerbaijan Province, Iran. At the 2006 census, its population was 141, in 25 families.
