= Qushchi Bayram Khvajeh =

Qushchi Bayram Khvajeh قوشچي بايرام خواجه
- Village
- Location within Iran
- Coordinates: 39°02′05″N 47°21′51″E
- Country: Iran
- Province: East Azerbaijan
- County: Kaleybar
- Bakhsh: Abish Ahmad
- Rural District: Abish Ahmad

Population (2006)
  - Total: 399
- Time zone: UTC+3:30 (IRST)
  - Summer (DST): UTC+4:30 (IRDT)

Qushchi Bayram Khvajeh (Persian: قوشچي بايرام خواجه, also Romanized as Qūshchī Bāyrām Khvājeh; also known as Qayah Bāsh Bāyrām Khūyeh) is a village in Abish Ahmad Rural District, Abish Ahmad District, Kaleybar County, East Azerbaijan Province, Iran. At the 2006 census, its population was 399, in 86 families.
