= Yeli-ye Sofla =

Yeli-ye Sofla يلي سفلي
- Village
- Location within Iran
- Coordinates: 39°14′28″N 47°20′07″E
- Country: Iran
- Province: East Azerbaijan
- County: Kaleybar
- Bakhsh: Abish Ahmad
- Rural District: Qeshlaq

Population (2006)
  - Total: 178
- Time zone: UTC+3:30 (IRST)
  - Summer (DST): UTC+4:30 (IRDT)

Yeli-ye Sofla (Persian: يلي سفلي, also Romanized as Yelī-ye Soflá; also known as Yelī) is a village in Qeshlaq Rural District, Abish Ahmad District, Kaleybar County, East Azerbaijan Province, Iran. At the 2006 census, its population was 178, in 40 families.
