= Qurtlujeh =

Qurtlujeh (Persian: قورتلوجه) may refer to:

- Qurtlujeh-e Olya
- Qurtlujeh-e Sofla
