= Lomeh Daraq =

Village in East Azerbaijan province, Iran

Lomeh Daraq Persian: لمه درق
- Village
- Location within Iran
- Coordinates: 39°04′55″N 47°24′58″E
- Country: Iran
- Province: East Azerbaijan
- County: Kaleybar
- District: Abesh Ahmad
- Rural District: Abesh Ahmad

Population (2016)
  - Total: 632
- Time zone: UTC+3:30 (IRST)

Lomeh Daraq (Persian: لمه درق) is a village in Abesh Ahmad Rural District of Abesh Ahmad District in Kaleybar County, East Azerbaijan province, Iran.

== Demographics ==
=== Population ===
At the time of the 2006 National Census, the village's population was 765 in 162 households. The following census in 2011 counted 1,143 people in 242 households. The 2016 census measured the population of the village as 632 people in 152 households.
