= Allulu =

Village in East Azerbaijan province, Iran

Allulu Persian: علولو
- Village
- Location within Iran
- Coordinates: 39°02′32″N 47°21′28″E
- Country: Iran
- Province: East Azerbaijan
- County: Kaleybar
- District: Abesh Ahmad
- Rural District: Abesh Ahmad

Population (2016)
  - Total: 544
- Time zone: UTC+3:30 (IRST)

Allulu (Persian: علولو) (Note: Also romanized as ‘Allūlū; also known as ‘Alalūlū) is a village in Abesh Ahmad Rural District of Abesh Ahmad District in Kaleybar County, East Azerbaijan province, Iran.

== Demographics ==
=== Population ===
At the time of the 2006 National Census, the village's population was 516 in 96 households. The following census in 2011 counted 375 people in 83 households. The 2016 census measured the population of the village as 544 people in 170 households.
