= Najaf (disambiguation) =

Najaf is a city in Iraq.

Najaf may also refer to:

== Places ==
- Najaf Governorate, a province in Iraq
- Najaf, Iran, a village in North Khorasan Province, Iran
- Najaf-e Tarakomeh, a village in East Azerbaijan Province, Iran
- Najaf Abad, a city in Isfahan Province, Iran
- Nadjaf Al Ashraf, Senegal

== People ==
- Najaf Shah (born 1984), Pakistani first-class cricketer
- Najaf bey Vazirov (1854–1926), Azerbaijani playwright and journalist
- Najaf Abbas Sial (1959–2018), Pakistani politician
- Mirza Najaf Khan (1733–1782), Persian adventurer

== Sport ==
- Najaf FC, an Iraqi football club based in Najaf, Iraq
- An-Najaf Stadium, a multi-use stadium in Najaf, Iraq

== Other uses ==
- Battle of Najaf (disambiguation), several battles during the Iraq War
- Najaf governorate election, 2009
- Al Najaf International Airport, airport serving Najaf, Iraq
