= Shamlu-ye Bozorg =

Village in East Azerbaijan province, Iran

Shamlu-ye Bozorg Persian: شاملوبزرگ
- Village
- Location within Iran
- Coordinates: 39°10′13″N 47°16′00″E
- Country: Iran
- Province: East Azerbaijan
- County: Kaleybar
- District: Abesh Ahmad
- Rural District: Qeshlaq

Population (2016)
  - Total: 542
- Time zone: UTC+3:30 (IRST)

Shamlu-ye Bozorg (Persian: شاملوبزرگ) (Note: Also romanized as Shāmlū-ye Bozorg; also known as Shāmlū and Shāmlū-ye Pā'īn) is a village in Qeshlaq Rural District of Abesh Ahmad District in Kaleybar County, East Azerbaijan province, Iran.

== Demographics ==
=== Ethnicity ===
The village is populated by the Kurdish Chalabianlu tribe.

=== Population ===
At the time of the 2006 National Census, the village's population was 608 in 122 households. The following census in 2011 counted 631 people in 162 households. The 2016 census measured the population of the village as 542 people in 164 households.
