= Qeshlaq-e Gazlu Hajji Mohammad =

Qeshlaq-e Gazlu Hajji Mohammad قشلاق گازلوحاجي محمد
- Village
- Country: Iran
- Province: East Azerbaijan
- County: Kaleybar
- Bakhsh: Abish Ahmad
- Rural District: Qeshlaq

Population (2006)
  - Total: 40
- Time zone: UTC+3:30 (IRST)
  - Summer (DST): UTC+4:30 (IRDT)

Qeshlaq-e Gazlu Hajji Mohammad (Persian: قشلاق گازلوحاجي محمد, also Romanized as Qeshlāq-e Gāzlū Ḩājjī Moḩammad) is a village in Qeshlaq Rural District, Abish Ahmad District, Kaleybar County, East Azerbaijan Province, Iran. At the 2006 census, its population was 40, in 8 families.
