= Bastamlu =

Village in East Azerbaijan province, Iran

Bastamlu Persian: بسطاملو
- Village
- Location within Iran
- Coordinates: 39°11′25″N 47°07′19″E
- Country: Iran
- Province: East Azerbaijan
- County: Khoda Afarin
- District: Central
- Rural District: Bastamlu

Population (2016)
  - Total: 465
- Time zone: UTC+3:30 (IRST)

Bastamlu (Persian: بسطاملو) (Note: Also romanized as Basţāmlū) is a village in, and the capital of, Bastamlu Rural District in the Central District of Khoda Afarin County, East Azerbaijan province, Iran.

== Demographics ==
=== Population ===
At the time of the 2006 National Census, the village's population was 598 in 127 households, when it was in the former Khoda Afarin District of Kaleybar County. The following census in 2011 counted 563 people in 151 households, by which time the district had been separated from the county in the establishment of Khoda Afarin County. The rural district was transferred to the new Central District. The 2016 census measured the population of the village as 465 people in 142 households.
