= Darani =

Village in East Azerbaijan province, Iran

Darani Persian: داراني
- Village
- Location within Iran
- Coordinates: 38°53′34″N 46°36′14″E
- Country: Iran
- Province: East Azerbaijan
- County: Khoda Afarin
- District: Manjavan
- Rural District: Dizmar-e Sharqi

Population (2016)
  - Total: 194
- Time zone: UTC+3:30 (IRST)

Darani (Persian: داراني) (Note: Also romanized as Dārānī; also known as Dānvarā, Dārānā, and Tārānī) is a village in Dizmar-e Sharqi Rural District of Manjavan District in Khoda Afarin County, East Azerbaijan province, Iran.

== Demographics ==
=== Population ===
At the time of the 2006 National Census, the village's population was 295 in 66 households, when it was in the former Khoda Afarin District of Kaleybar County. The following census in 2011 counted 270 people in 75 households, by which time the district had been separated from the county in the establishment of Khoda Afarin County. The rural district was transferred to the new Manjavan District. The 2016 census measured the population of the village as 194 people in 67 households.
