= Dinehvar =

Dinehvar دينه ور
- Village
- Location within Iran
- Coordinates: 38°48′28″N 46°38′31″E
- Country: Iran
- Province: East Azerbaijan
- County: Khoda Afarin
- Bakhsh: Minjavan
- Rural District: Dizmar-e Sharqi

Population (2006)
  - Total: 81
- Time zone: UTC+3:30 (IRST)
  - Summer (DST): UTC+4:30 (IRDT)

Dinehvar (Persian: دينه ور, also Romanized as Dīnehvar; also known as Dīnavar, Dinovar, and Dīnvar) is a village in Dizmar-e Sharqi Rural District, Minjavan District, Khoda Afarin County, East Azerbaijan Province, Iran. At the 2006 census, its population was 81, in 22 families.
