= Garamduz-e Sharqi Rural District =

Rural district in East Azerbaijan province, Iran

Garamduz-e Sharqi Rural District Persian: دهستان گرمادوز شرقي
- Rural District
- Location within Iran
- Coordinates: 39°21′N 47°23′E
- Country: Iran
- Province: East Azerbaijan
- County: Khoda Afarin
- District: Garamduz
- Established: 2010
- Capital: Mahmudabad

Population (2016)
  - Total: 4,236
- Time zone: UTC+3:30 (IRST)

Garamduz-e Sharqi Rural District (Persian: دهستان گرمادوز شرقي) is in Garamduz District of Khoda Afarin County, East Azerbaijan province, Iran. Its capital is the village of Mahmudabad.

== History ==
In 2010, Khoda Afarin District was separated from Kaleybar County in the establishment of Khoda Afarin County, and Garamduz-e Sharqi Rural District was created in the new Garamduz District.

== Demographics ==
=== Population ===
At the time of the 2011 census, the rural district's population was 4,138 inhabitants in 1,021 households. The 2016 census measured the population of the rural district as 4,236 in 1,212 households. The most populous of its 15 villages was Mahmudabad, with 1,138 people.

=== Other villages in the rural district ===
- Ayri Bujaq
- Khalaf Beygluy-e Olya
- Qurtlujeh-e Olya
- Qurtlujeh-e Sofla
