= Kalaleh Eslami =

Village in East Azerbaijan province, Iran

Kalaleh Eslami Persian: كلاله اسلامي
- Village
- Location within Iran
- Coordinates: 38°53′13″N 46°35′44″E
- Country: Iran
- Province: East Azerbaijan
- County: Khoda Afarin
- District: Manjavan
- Rural District: Dizmar-e Sharqi

Population (2016)
  - Total: 174
- Time zone: UTC+3:30 (IRST)

Kalaleh Eslami (Persian: كلاله اسلامي) (Note: Also romanized as Kalāleh Eslāmī; also known as Kalāleh, Kalla, Kelyaga, Qeshlāq, and Qishlāq) is a village in Dizmar-e Sharqi Rural District of Manjavan District in Khoda Afarin County, East Azerbaijan province, Iran.

== Demographics ==
=== Population ===
At the time of the 2006 National Census, the village's population was 243 in 60 households, when it was in the former Khoda Afarin District of Kaleybar County. The following census in 2011 counted 228 people in 67 households, by which time the district had been separated from the county in the establishment of Khoda Afarin County. The rural district was transferred to the new Manjavan District. The 2016 census measured the population of the village as 177 people in 71 households.
