= Owli =

Village in East Azerbaijan province, Iran

Owli Persian: اولي
- Village
- Location within Iran
- Coordinates: 38°48′22″N 46°30′40″E
- Country: Iran
- Province: East Azerbaijan
- County: Khoda Afarin
- District: Manjavan
- Rural District: Dizmar-e Sharqi

Population (2016)
  - Total: 228
- Time zone: UTC+3:30 (IRST)

Owli (Persian: اولي) (Note: Also romanized as Owlī; also known as Ūlīq (اوليق)) is a village in the Dizmar-e Sharqi Rural District of Manjavan District in Khoda Afarin County, East Azerbaijan province, Iran.

== Demographics ==
=== Population ===
At the time of the 2006 National Census, the village's population was 300 people in 70 households. It was in the former Khoda Afarin District of Kaleybar County at the time. The following census in 2011 recorded a population of 311 people in 88 households, by which time the district had been separated from the county in the establishment of the Khoda Afarin County. The rural district was transferred to the new Manjavan District. The 2016 census measured the population of the village at 228 people in 71 households.
