= Najaf-e Tarakomeh =

Village in East Azerbaijan province, Iran

Najaf-e Tarakomeh Persian: نجف تراكمه
- Village
- Location within Iran
- Coordinates: 39°04′56″N 47°23′49″E
- Country: Iran
- Province: East Azerbaijan
- County: Kaleybar
- District: Abesh Ahmad
- Rural District: Abesh Ahmad

Population (2016)
  - Total: 1,405
- Time zone: UTC+3:30 (IRST)

Najaf-e Tarakomeh (Persian: نجف تراكمه) (Note: Also romanized as Najaf-e Tarākomeh; also known as Najaf and Qeshlāq-e Najaf-e Tarākameh) is a village in Abesh Ahmad Rural District of Abesh Ahmad District in Kaleybar County, East Azerbaijan province, Iran.

== Demographics ==
=== Population ===
At the time of the 2006 National Census, the village's population was 1,432 in 324 households. The following census in 2011 counted 1,430 people in 345 households. The 2016 census measured the population of the village as 1,405 people in 378 households. It was the most populous village in its rural district.
