= Qarah Daraq-e Olya =

Qarah Daraq-e Olya (Persian: قره درق عليا) may refer to:

- Qarah Daraq-e Olya 1
- Qarah Daraq-e Olya 2
