= Khalaf Beygluy-e Olya =

Village in East Azerbaijan province, Iran

Khalaf Beygluy-e Olya Persian: خلف بيگلوي عليا
- Village
- Location within Iran
- Coordinates: 39°20′21″N 47°16′30″E
- Country: Iran
- Province: East Azerbaijan
- County: Khoda Afarin
- District: Garamduz
- Rural District: Garamduz-e Sharqi

Population (2016)
  - Total: 368
- Time zone: UTC+3:30 (IRST)

Khalaf Beygluy-e Olya (Persian: خلف بيگلوي عليا) (Note: Also romanized as Khalaf Beyglūy-e ‘Olyā; also known as Khalaf Beyglū-ye Bālā and Khalaf Beyglū-ye ‘Olyā) is a village in Garamduz-e Sharqi Rural District of Garamduz District in Khoda Afarin County, East Azerbaijan province, Iran.

== Demographics ==
=== Population ===
At the time of the 2006 National Census, the village's population was 392 in 86 households, when it was in Garamduz Rural District (Note: Renamed Garamduz-e Gharbi Rural District) of the former Khoda Afarin District in Kaleybar County. The following census in 2011 counted 371 people in 96 households, by which time the district had been separated from the county in the establishment of Khoda Afarin County. The rural district was transferred to the new Garamduz District and renamed Garamduz-e Gharbi Rural District. Khalaf Beygluy-e Olya was transferred to Garamduz-e Sharqi Rural District created in the district. The 2016 census measured the population of the village as 368 people in 101 households.
