= Mahmudabad, Khoda Afarin =

Village in East Azerbaijan province, Iran

Mahmudabad Persian: محموداباد
- Village
- Location within Iran
- Coordinates: 39°24′18″N 47°21′34″E
- Country: Iran
- Province: East Azerbaijan
- County: Khoda Afarin
- District: Garamduz
- Rural District: Garamduz-e Sharqi

Population (2016)
  - Total: 1,138
- Time zone: UTC+3:30 (IRST)

Mahmudabad (Persian: محموداباد) (Note: Also romanized as Maḩmūdābād) is a village in, and the capital of, Garamduz-e Sharqi Rural District in Garamduz District of Khoda Afarin County, East Azerbaijan province, Iran.

== Demographics ==
=== Population ===
At the time of the 2006 National Census, the village's population was 1,058 in 215 households, when it was in Garamduz Rural District (Note: Renamed Garamduz-e Gharbi Rural District) of the former Khoda Afarin District in Kaleybar County. The following census in 2011 counted 1,074 people in 255 households, by which time the district had been separated from the county in the establishment of Khoda Afarin County. The rural district was transferred to the new Garamduz District and renamed Garamduz-e Gharbi Rural District. Mahmudabad was transferred to Garamduz-e Sharqi Rural District created in the district. The 2016 census measured the population of the village as 1,138 people in 326 households. It was the most populous village in its rural district.
