= Mardanaqom =

Village in East Azerbaijan province, Iran

Mardanaqom Persian: مرداناقم
- Village
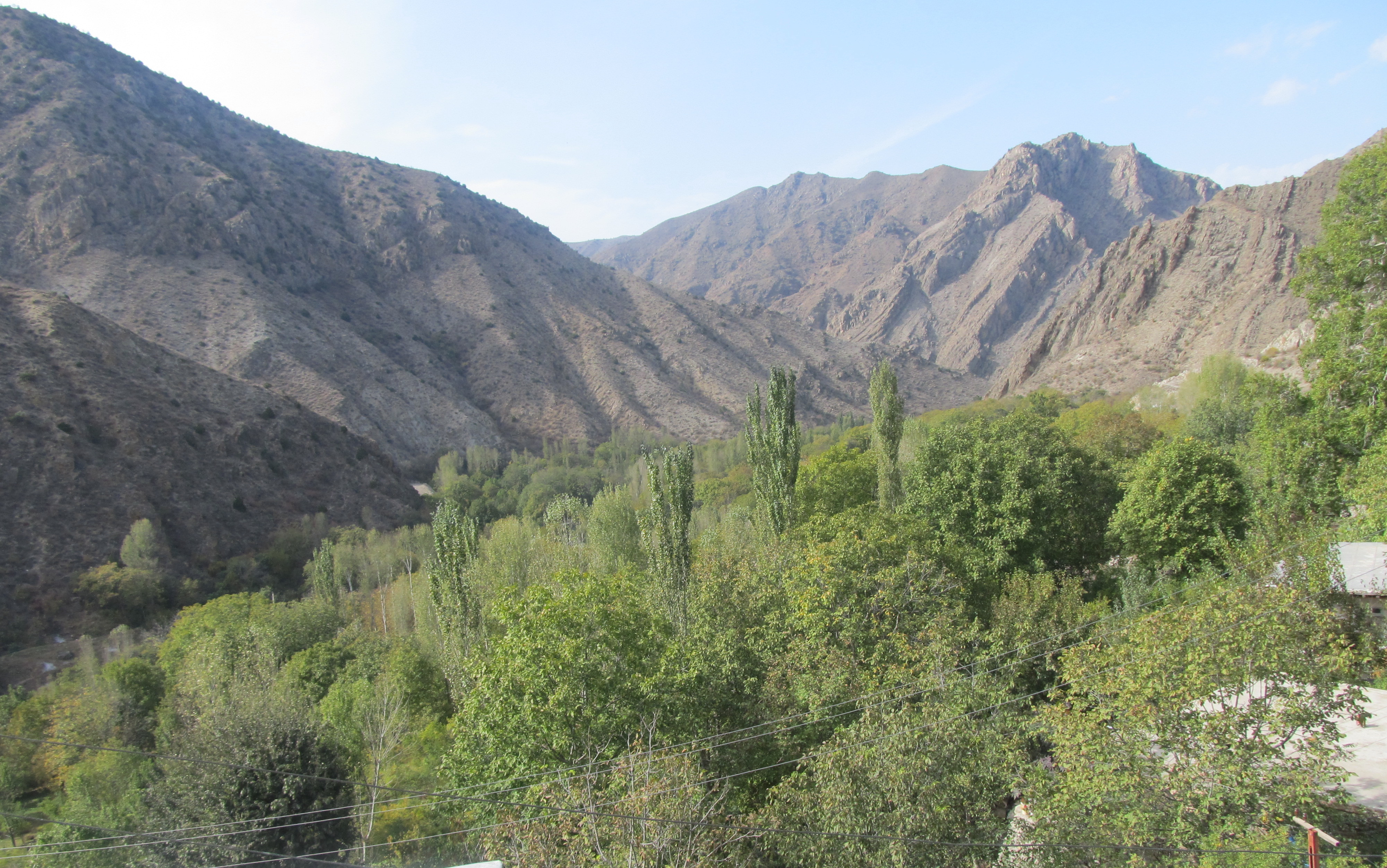
- Pomegranate orchards in rocky terrain

- Location within Iran
- Coordinates: 38°49′58″N 46°33′07″E
- Country: Iran
- Province: East Azerbaijan
- County: Khoda Afarin
- District: Manjavan
- Rural District: Dizmar-e Sharqi

Population (2016)
  - Total: 601
- Time zone: UTC+3:30 (IRST)

Mardanaqom (Persian: مرداناقم) (Note: Also romanized as Mardānāqom; also known as Mard Agham, Mardānqom (مردانقم), Mardenaum, and Merdenaum) is a village in, and the capital of, Dizmar-e Sharqi Rural District in Manjavan District of Khoda Afarin County, East Azerbaijan province, Iran.

== Demographics ==
=== Population ===
According to reports from Iranian Army files, there was reported a population of 639 people in late 1940s. At the time of the 2006 National Census, the village's population was 730 in 176 households, when it was in the former Khoda Afarin District of Kaleybar County. The following census in 2011 counted 651 people in 205 households, by which time the district had been separated from the county in the establishment of Khoda Afarin County. The rural district was transferred to the new Manjavan District. The 2016 census measured the population of the village as 601 people in 195 households.

== History ==
Mardanaqom was first mentioned by the renowned historian Hamdallah Mustawfi in the late twelfth century. At the time, apparently, Mardanaqom was the capital of a thriving district.

In 1986, Mardanaqom was designated as the capital of Dizmar-e Sharqi Rural District.

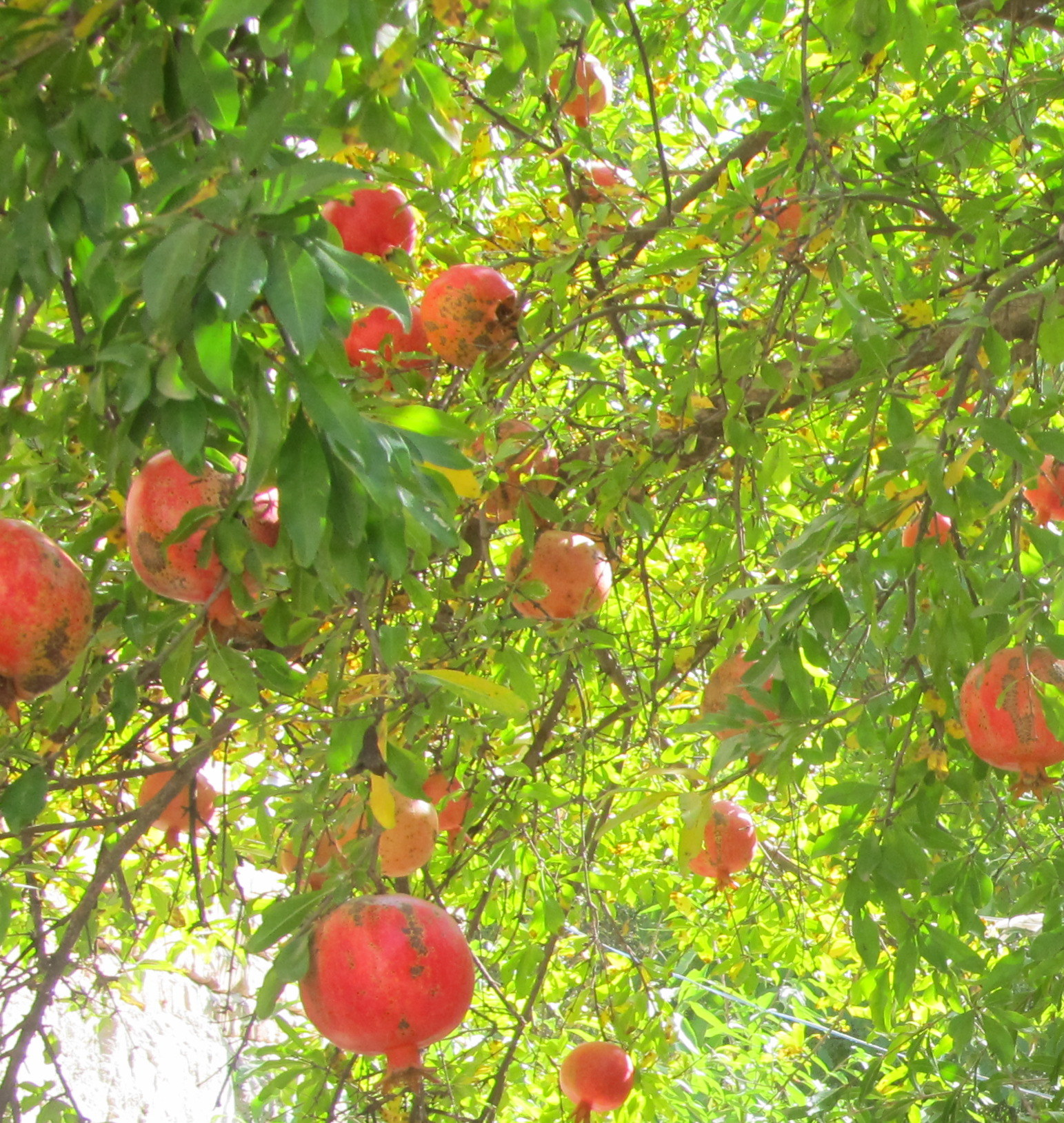
Gülabsha Pomegranate in orchards of Mardanaqom.

== Pomegranate Festival ==
The village is a renowned center of Pomegranate and grape production in Arasbaran region. These produces have a characteristic potential of being preserved for over six months without requiring refrigeration. This feature was remarked by Robert Mignan, who traveled through Arasbaran in 1830s. Every year, in the second half of October, a Pomegranate Festival is organized by the provincial authorities in the village. The main feature of the festival is performance of Ashugh music.

== Sasanian castle ==
On a mountain near the village, there is a castle dating from Sasanian era. It was used as a jail for high-ranking officials during Khwarazmian reign.
