= Ahmadabad, Khoda Afarin =

Village in East Azerbaijan province, Iran

Ahmadabad Persian: احمداباد
- Village
- Location within Iran
- Coordinates: 38°50′55″N 46°31′04″E
- Country: Iran
- Province: East Azerbaijan
- County: Khoda Afarin
- District: Manjavan
- Rural District: Dizmar-e Sharqi

Population (2016)
  - Total: 174
- Time zone: UTC+3:30 (IRST)

Ahmadabad (Persian: احمداباد) (Note: Also romanized as Aḩmadābād; also known as Akhmed-oba) is a village in Dizmar-e Sharqi Rural District of Manjavan District in Khoda Afarin County, East Azerbaijan province, Iran.

== Demographics ==
=== Population ===
At the time of the 2006 National Census, the village's population was 211 in 44 households, when it was in the former Khoda Afarin District of Kaleybar County. The following census in 2011 counted 167 people in 40 households, by which time the district had been separated from the county in the establishment of Khoda Afarin County. The rural district was transferred to the new Manjavan District. The 2016 census measured the population of the village as 174 people in 50 households.
