= Shamloo =

Shamloo may refer to:

- Ahmad Shamloo
- Shamlu (disambiguation), places in Iran
