= Marzabad, Khoda Afarin =

Village in East Azerbaijan province, Iran

Marzabad Persian: مرزاباد
- Village
- Location within Iran
- Coordinates: 38°52′28″N 46°31′26″E
- Country: Iran
- Province: East Azerbaijan
- County: Khoda Afarin
- District: Manjavan
- Rural District: Dizmar-e Sharqi

Population (2016)
  - Total: 742
- Time zone: UTC+3:30 (IRST)

Marzabad (Persian: مرزاباد) (Note: Also romanized as Marzābād; also known as Qarahchī-ye Aḩmadābād (قره چي احمداباد) and Qūrchī-ye Aḩmadābād) is a village in Dizmar-e Sharqi Rural District of Manjavan District in Khoda Afarin County, East Azerbaijan province, Iran.

== Demographics ==
=== Population ===
At the time of the 2006 National Census, the village's population was 653 in 121 households, when it was in the former Khoda Afarin District of Kaleybar County. The following census in 2011 counted 790 people in 182 households, by which time the district had been separated from the county in the establishment of Khoda Afarin County. The rural district was transferred to the new Manjavan District. The 2016 census measured the population of the village as 742 people in 205 households. It was the most populous village in its rural district.
