= Avarsin Castle =

Castle in East Azerbaijan Province, Iran

- قلعه آوارسین
- Interactive map of the Avarsin Castle area

General information
- Type: Castle
- Location: Kaleybar County, Iran
- Coordinates: 38°59′21″N 47°3′51″E

Avarsin Castle (Persian: قلعه آوارسین) is a historical castle located in Kaleybar County in East Azerbaijan Province, The longevity of this fortress dates back to the 1st millennium BC.
