= Hur Moghan-e Olya =

Hur Moghan-e Olya هورمغان عليا
- Village
- Location within Iran
- Coordinates: 38°42′57″N 47°01′52″E
- Country: Iran
- Province: East Azerbaijan
- County: Kaleybar
- Bakhsh: Central
- Rural District: Peyghan Chayi

Population (2006)
  - Total: 37
- Time zone: UTC+3:30 (IRST)
  - Summer (DST): UTC+4:30 (IRDT)

Hur Moghan-e Olya (Persian: هورمغان عليا, also Romanized as Hūr Moghān-e ‘Olyā and Hoor Moghan Olya; also known as Ḩūrī Moqān, Ḩūr Moghān-e Bālā, Ḩūr Moqān-e Bālā, and Verkhnyaya Gurman) is a village in Peyghan Chayi Rural District, in the Central District of Kaleybar County, East Azerbaijan Province, Iran. At the 2006 census, its population was 37, in 13 families.
