= Asbhar-e Olya =

Asbhar-e Olya اسبهارعليا
- Village
- Location within Iran
- Coordinates: 39°07′38″N 47°14′38″E
- Country: Iran
- Province: East Azerbaijan
- County: Kaleybar
- Bakhsh: Central
- Rural District: Mulan

Population (2006)
  - Total: 156
- Time zone: UTC+3:30 (IRST)
  - Summer (DST): UTC+4:30 (IRDT)

Asbhar-e Olya (Persian: اسبهارعليا, also Romanized as Asbhār-e ‘Olyā; also known as Asbhār-e Bālā) is a village in Mulan Rural District, in the Central District of Kaleybar County, East Azerbaijan Province, Iran. At the 2006 census, its population was 156, in 27 families.
