= Eskanluy-ye Sofla =

Village in East Azerbaijan province, Iran

Eskanluy-ye Sofla Persian: اسكانلوی سفلی
- Village
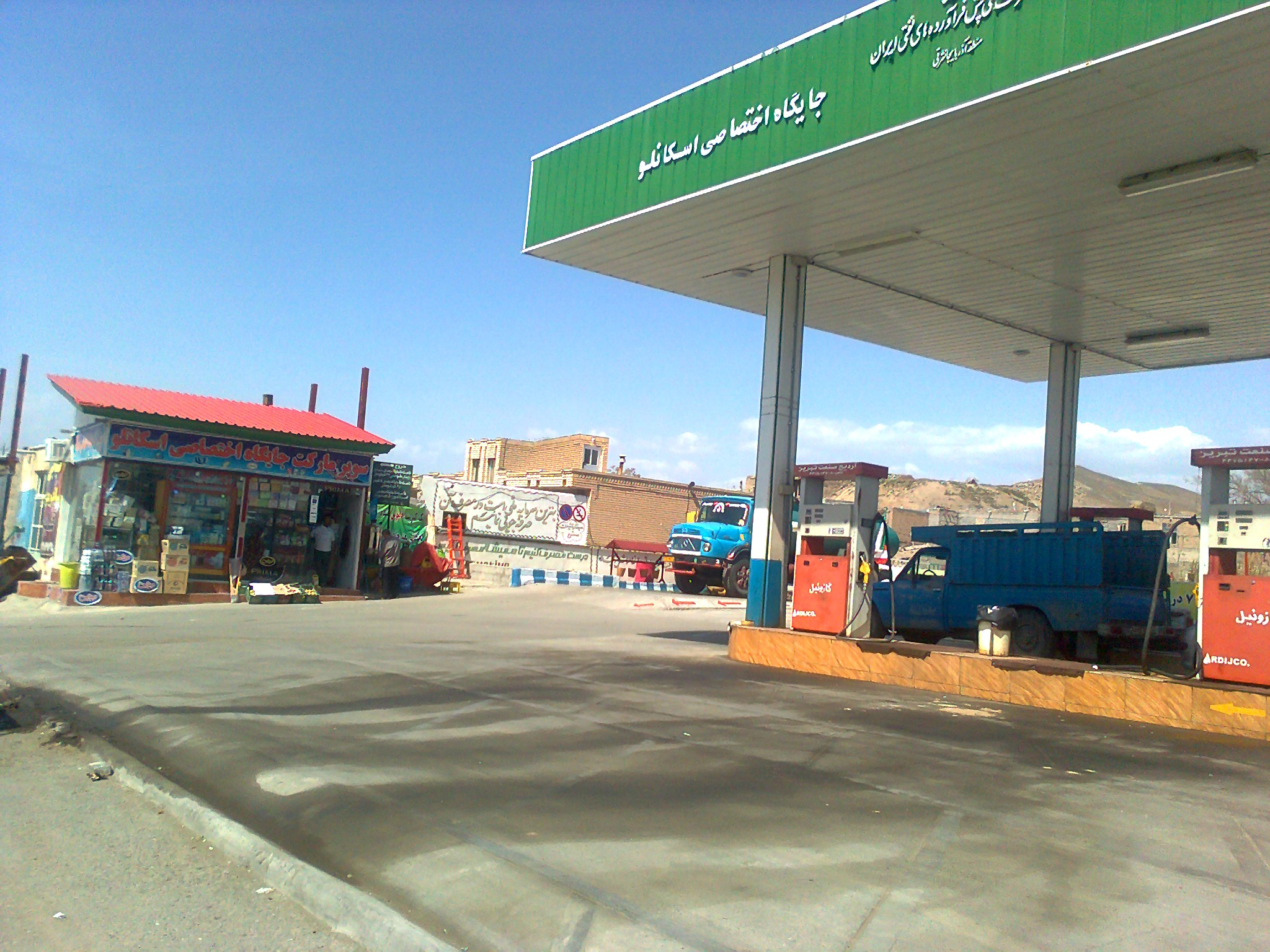

- Location within Iran
- Coordinates: 39°13′07″N 47°05′04″E
- Country: Iran
- Province: East Azerbaijan
- County: Khoda Afarin
- District: Central
- Rural District: Bastamlu

Population (2016)
  - Total: 564
- Time zone: UTC+3:30 (IRST)

Eskanluy-ye Sofla (Persian: اسكانلوی سفلی) (Note: Also known as Eskanlou-e Sofla, also romanized as Eskānloū-e Soflá; also known as Īdahlū (ايده لو)) is a village in Bastamlu Rural District of the Central District in Khoda Afarin County, East Azerbaijan province, Iran.

== Demographics ==
=== Population ===
At the time of the 2006 National Census, the village's population was 557 in 95 households, when it was in the former Khoda Afarin District of Kaleybar County. The following census in 2011 counted 561 people in 131 households, by which time the district had been separated from the county in the establishment of Khoda Afarin County. The rural district was transferred to the new Central District. The 2016 census measured the population of the village as 564 people in 143 households.
