= Eskanluy-ye Olya =

Village in East Azerbaijan province, Iran

Eskanluy-ye Olya Persian: اسكانلوی عليا
- Village
- Location within Iran
- Coordinates: 39°13′02″N 47°06′39″E
- Country: Iran
- Province: East Azerbaijan
- County: Khoda Afarin
- District: Central
- Rural District: Bastamlu

Population (2016)
  - Total: 384
- Time zone: UTC+3:30 (IRST)

Eskanluy-ye Olya (Persian: اسكانلوي عليا) (Note: Also Romanized as Oskanluy-e Olya and Oskānlūy-e ‘Olyā; also known as Oskānlū-ye Bālā and Qarah Īdī (قره ايدي)) is a village in Bastamlu Rural District of the Central District in Khoda Afarin County, East Azerbaijan province, Iran.

== Demographics ==
=== Population ===
At the time of the 2006 National Census, the village's population was 473 in 84 households, when it was in the former Khoda Afarin District of Kaleybar County. The following census in 2011 counted 409 people in 97 households, by which time the district had been separated from the county in the establishment of Khoda Afarin County. The rural district was transferred to the new Central District. The 2016 census measured the population of the village as 384 people in 117 households.
