= Qurtlujeh-e Sofla =

Village in East Azerbaijan province, Iran

Qurtlujeh-e Sofla Persian: قورتلوجه سفلي
- Village
- Location within Iran
- Country: Iran
- Province: East Azerbaijan
- County: Khoda Afarin
- District: Garamduz
- Rural District: Garamduz-e Sharqi

Population (2016)
  - Total: 598
- Time zone: UTC+3:30 (IRST)

Qurtlujeh-e Sofla (Persian: قورتلوجه سفلي) (Note: Also romanized as Qūrtlūjeh-e Soflā) is a village in Garamduz-e Sharqi Rural District of Garamduz District in Khoda Afarin County, East Azerbaijan province, Iran.

== Demographics ==
=== Population ===
At the time of the 2006 National Census, the village's population was 590 in 119 households, when it was in Garamduz Rural District (Note: Renamed Garamduz-e Gharbi Rural District) of the former Khoda Afarin District in Kaleybar County. The following census in 2011 counted 615 people in 152 households, by which time the district had been separated from the county in the establishment of Khoda Afarin County. The rural district was transferred to the new Garamduz District and renamed Garamduz-e Gharbi Rural District. Qurtlujeh-e Sofla was transferred to Garamduz-e Sharqi Rural District created in the district. The 2016 census measured the population of the village as 598 people in 163 households.
