= Hur Moghan-e Sofla =

Hur Moghan-e Sofla حورمغان سفلی
- Village
- Location within Iran
- Coordinates: 38°42′51″N 47°00′57″E
- Country: Iran
- Province: East Azerbaijan
- County: Kaleybar
- Bakhsh: Central
- Rural District: Peyghan Chayi

Population (2006)
  - Total: 17
- Time zone: UTC+3:30 (IRST)
  - Summer (DST): UTC+4:30 (IRDT)

Hur Moghan-e Sofla (Persian: حورمغان سفلی, also Romanized as Hūr Moghān-e Soflá and Hoor Moghan Sofla; also known as Ḩūrī Moghān-e Soflá, Ḩūr Moghān-e Pā’īn, Ḩūr Moqān-e Pā’īn, and Nizhnyaya Gurman) is a village in Peyghan Chayi Rural District, in the Central District of Kaleybar County, East Azerbaijan Province, Iran. At the 2006 census, its population was 17, in 5 families.
