= Abesh Ahmad =

City in East Azerbaijan province, Iran

Abesh Ahmad Persian: آبش احمد
- City
- Location within Iran
- Coordinates: 39°02′47″N 47°19′04″E
- Country: Iran
- Province: East Azerbaijan
- County: Kaleybar
- District: Abesh Ahmad
- Established as a city: 2003

Population (2016)
  - Total: 2,715
- Time zone: UTC+3:30 (IRST)
- Climate: Cfa

Abesh Ahmad (Persian: آبش احمد) (Note: Also romanized as Ābesh Aḩmad; also known as Abish Ahmad; also romanized as Abīsh Aḩmad) is a city in, and the capital of, Abesh Ahmad District in Kaleybar County, East Azerbaijan province, Iran. It also serves as the administrative center for Abesh Ahmad Rural District. The village of Abesh Ahmad was converted to a city in 2003.

== Demographics ==
=== Language ===
Abesh Ahmad is an Azeri Turkic-speaking village.

=== Population ===
At the time of the 2006 National Census, the city's population was 2,329 in 526 households. The following census in 2011 counted 2,318 people in 591 households. The 2016 census measured the population of the city as 2,715 people in 789 households.

== Notable people ==
Qoliallah Qolizadeh, Iranian Politician
