= Shahidlu =

Shahidlu شهيدلو
- Village
- Location within Iran
- Coordinates: 37°23′36″N 47°48′36″E
- Country: Iran
- Province: East Azerbaijan
- County: Meyaneh
- Bakhsh: Central
- Rural District: Qaflankuh-e Gharbi

Population (2006)
  - Total: 9
- Time zone: UTC+3:30 (IRST)
  - Summer (DST): UTC+4:30 (IRDT)

RostamShahidlu (Persian: شهيدلو, also Romanized as Shahīdlū; also known as Seyyedlar and Seyyedlū) is a village in Qaflankuh-e Gharbi Rural District, in the Central District of Meyaneh County, East Azerbaijan Province, Iran. At the 2006 census, its population was 9, in 5 families.
