= Battle of Najaf =

Battle of Najaf or Siege of Najaf may refer to several battles or sieges:

- Siege of Najaf (1918)
- Battle of Najaf (2003)
- Battle of Najaf (2004)
- Battle of Najaf (2007)
