= Ojaq Kandi, Minjavan =

Ojaq Kandi اجاق كندي
- Village
- Location within Iran
- Coordinates: 38°47′14″N 46°37′45″E
- Country: Iran
- Province: East Azerbaijan
- County: Khoda Afarin
- Bakhsh: Minjavan
- Rural District: Dizmar-e Sharqi

Population (2006)
  - Total: 25
- Time zone: UTC+3:30 (IRST)
  - Summer (DST): UTC+4:30 (IRDT)

Ojaq Kandi (Persian: اجاق كندي, also Romanized as Ojāq Kandī; also known as Ūjāq Kandī) is a village in Dizmar-e Sharqi Rural District, Minjavan District, Khoda Afarin County, East Azerbaijan Province, Iran. At the 2006 census, its population was 25, in 9 families.
