= Dilbilmaz, West Azerbaijan =

Dilbilmaz ديل بيلمز
- Village
- Location within Iran
- Coordinates: 38°56′03″N 44°40′52″E
- Country: Iran
- Province: West Azerbaijan
- County: Chaldoran
- Bakhsh: Central
- Rural District: Baba Jik

Population (2006)
  - Total: 60
- Time zone: UTC+3:30 (IRST)
  - Summer (DST): UTC+4:30 (IRDT)

Dilbilmaz (Persian: ديل بيلمز, also Romanized as Dīlbīlmaz; also known as Dīl Bīlīmaz) is a village in Baba Jik Rural District, in the Central District of Chaldoran County, West Azerbaijan Province, Iran. At the 2006 census, its population was 60, in 11 families.
