= Seyyedlar, Kandovan =

Seyyedlar سيدلر
- village
- Seyyedlar garm
- Location within Iran
- Coordinates: 37°47′45″N 47°59′28″E
- Country: Iran
- Province: East Azerbaijan
- County: Meyaneh
- Bakhsh: Kandovan
- Rural District: Garmeh-ye Shomali

Population (2006)
  - Total: 220
- Time zone: UTC+3:30 (IRST)
  - Summer (DST): UTC+4:30 (IRDT)

Seyyedlar (Persian: سيدلر; also known as Sar Lar, Sarlaro, and Seyyedlar-e Dalīkānlū) is a village in Garmeh-ye Shomali Rural District, Kandovan District, Meyaneh County, East Azerbaijan Province, Iran. At the 2006 census, its population was 139, in 34 families.
