= Abd ol Razzaq, West Azerbaijan =

Abd ol Razzaq عبدالرزاق
- Village
- Location within Iran
- Coordinates: 39°00′12″N 44°38′50″E
- Country: Iran
- Province: West Azerbaijan
- County: Chaldoran
- Bakhsh: Central
- Rural District: Baba Jik

Population (2006)
  - Total: 115
- Time zone: UTC+3:30 (IRST)
  - Summer (DST): UTC+4:30 (IRDT)

Abd ol Razzaq (Persian: عبدالرزاق, also Romanized as ‘Abd ol Razzāq and ‘Abd or Razzāq) is a village in Baba Jik Rural District, in the Central District of Chaldoran County, West Azerbaijan Province, Iran. At the 2006 census, its population was 115, in 22 families.
