= Seyyedlar, Ahar =

Seyyedlar سيدلر
- Village
- Location within Iran
- Coordinates: 38°23′10″N 47°16′05″E
- Country: Iran
- Province: East Azerbaijan
- County: Ahar
- Bakhsh: Central
- Rural District: Qeshlaq

Population (2006)
  - Total: 73
- Time zone: UTC+3:30 (IRST)
  - Summer (DST): UTC+4:30 (IRDT)

Seyyedlar (Persian: سيدلر) is a village in Qeshlaq Rural District, in the Central District of Ahar County, East Azerbaijan Province, Iran. At the 2006 census, its population was 73, in 23 families.
