= Ojaq Kandi, Khoda Afarin =

Ojaq Kandi اجاق كندي
- Village
- Location within Iran
- Coordinates: 39°10′35″N 47°12′55″E
- Country: Iran
- Province: East Azerbaijan
- County: Khoda Afarin
- Bakhsh: Central
- Rural District: Bastamlu

Population (2006)
  - Total: 513
- Time zone: UTC+3:30 (IRST)
  - Summer (DST): UTC+4:30 (IRDT)

Ojaq Kandi (Persian: اجاق كندي, also Romanized as Ojāq Kandī) is a village in Bastamlu Rural District, in the Central District of Khoda Afarin County, East Azerbaijan Province, Iran. At the 2006 census, its population was 513, in 101 families.
