= Robert Mignan =

British military officer, explorer and author

- Born: 1803
- Died: 3 June 1852; Poonah, India
- Occupations: Military officer; Explorer; Author
- Known for: Archaeological explorations in Iraq; Travel writings on the Middle East and Caucasus
- Notable work: Travels in Chaldæa (1829); A Winter Journey through Russia, the Caucasian Alps, and Georgia (1839)

Robert Mignan (1803 – 3 June 1852) was a British military officer, explorer, and author. He was a Fellow of the Linnean Society of London (FLS) and a member of the Royal Asiatic Society of Great Britain and Ireland.

Mignan entered the Bombay Army in 1819 and became a lieutenant of the 1st European Regiment on 3 May 1820. In January 1821, he was part of an expeditionary force of 2,695 men under the command of General Lionel Smith sent on a punitive campaign against the Bani Bu Ali tribe in Oman.

In the 1820s, Mignan commanded the escort attached to the resident of the British East India Company. Between 1826 and 1828, Mignan made several archaeological excursions into the little known regions of Iraq, visiting such sites as Ctesiphon and Babylon. He published Travels in Chaldæa: Including a Journey from Bussorah to Bagdad, Hillah, and Babylon, Performed on Foot in 1827 in 1829.

In 1829 Mignan departed, with his family, from London to return to his military duties in India. Travelling through St. Petersburg, the Russian capital, he joined Prince Khosrow Mirza, Persian envoy extraordinary, returning to Persia after conveying regrets at the murder of the Russian diplomat Alexander Griboedov in Teheran. While in St. Petersburg, Mignan met the Prussian scholar Alexander von Humboldt who convinced him to explore the western coastline of the Caspian Sea. His winter journey on a difficult route via Novocherkassk and through the Caucasus to Tiflis, the capital of Russian Georgia, and further south into northwestern Persia in 1829 and 1830 is described in Mignan's travelogue A Winter Journey through Russia, the Caucasian Alps, and Georgia, published in London in 1839.

Mignan was promoted to captain on 11 September 1830 and major of the right wing on 15 August 1847. His last commission was brevet lieutenant colonel on 7 June 1849. He died in Poonah in 1852.

== Bibliography ==
- Mignant, Robert (1829). Travels in Chaldæa: Including a Journey from Bussorah to Bagdad, Hillah, and Babylon, Performed on Foot in 1827. With Observations on the Sited and Remains of Babel, Seleucia, and Ctesiphon. London.
- Mignan, Robert (1834). "A Brief Sketch of the Present State of Georgia, now a Russian Province". Journal of the Asiatic Society of Bengal. 3: 232–238.
- Mignan, Robert (1834). "Journal of a tour through Georgia, Persia, and Mesopotamia". Journal of the Asiatic Society of Bengal. 3, 4: 271–280, 332–339. 456–463, 576–590, 602–620.
- Mignan, Robert (1839). A Winter Journey through Russia, the Caucasian Alps, and Georgia, thence across Mount Zagos, and by the Pass of Xenophon and the Ten housand Greeks, into Koordistan. Vol. 1, 2. London.
