= Dizmar-e Sharqi Rural District =

Rural district in East Azerbaijan province, Iran

Dizmar-e Sharqi Rural District Persian: دهستان ديزمار شرقي
- Rural District
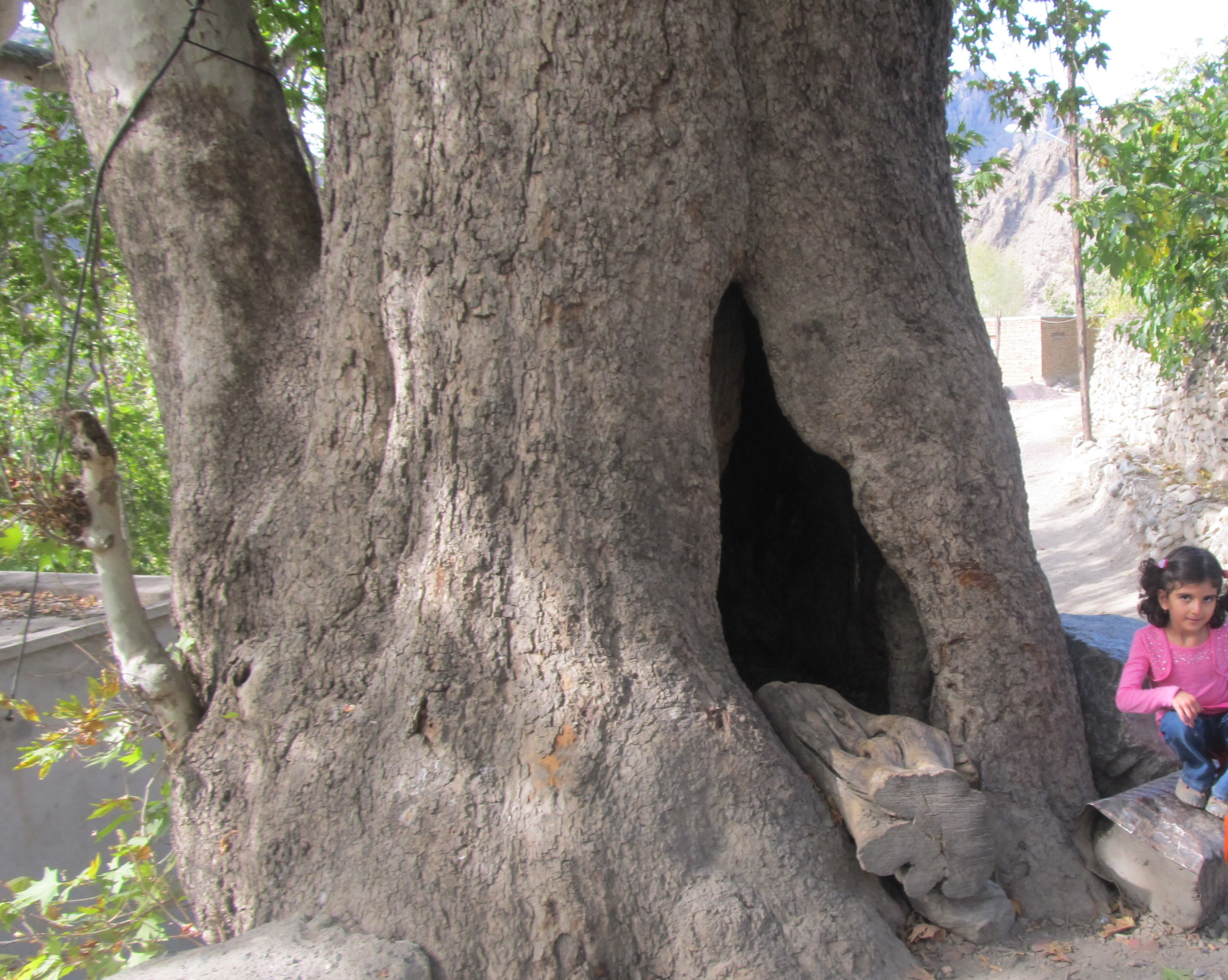
- The landmark plain tree in Kavanaq village

- Location within Iran
- Coordinates: 38°50′N 46°34′E
- Country: Iran
- Province: East Azerbaijan
- County: Khoda Afarin
- District: Manjavan
- Established: 1987
- Capital: Mardanaqom

Population (2016)
  - Total: 2,760
- Time zone: UTC+3:30 (IRST)

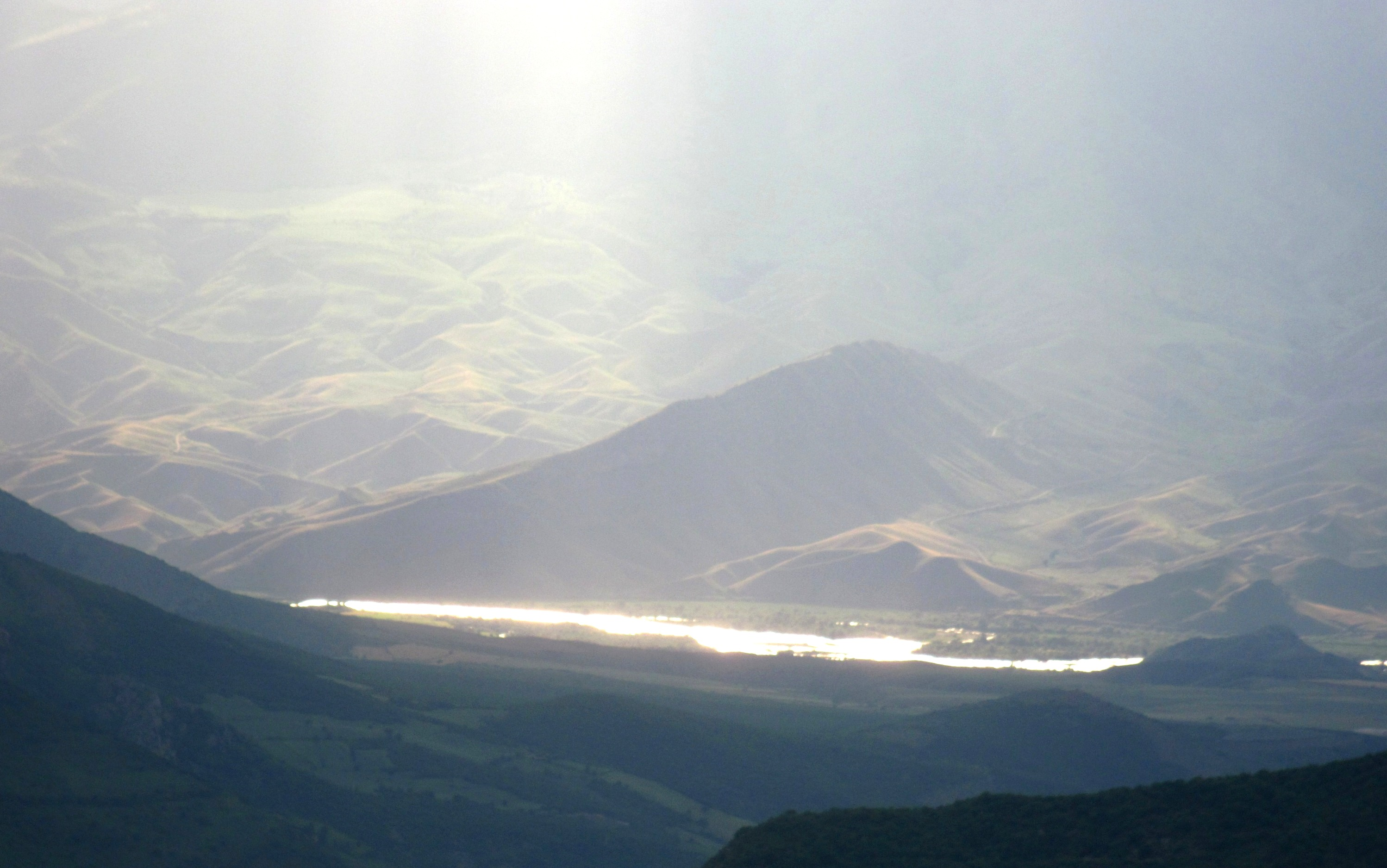
Sunset on Aras River in Dizmar Protected Area.

Dizmar-e Sharqi Rural District (Persian: دهستان ديزمار شرقي) (Note: Armenian: Տզմար or Դզմար Գաւառակ) is in Manjavan District of Khoda Afarin County, East Azerbaijan province, Iran. Its capital is the village of Mardanaqom.

== History ==
Dizmar was first mentioned by the renowned historian Hamdallah Mustawfi in the mid-fourteenth century: "Dizmar is a district in the north of Tabriz which includes more than 50 villages..." Mardanaqom, was also mentioned by Hamdallah Mustawfi as a thriving village. The landmark, manifesting ancient history of the district, is an ancient plane tree in Kavanaq village (included on the map). The tree is about 3 meter in diameter and is said to have lived for 500 years. Moreover, on a mountain between Kavanaq and Mardanaqom, there is a castle dating from Sasanian era. It was used as a jail for high-ranking officials during Khwarazmian reign.

=== White Revolution ===
In the wake of White Revolution (early 1960s) many clans of Qarāca Dāġ tribes used Dizmar as their winter quarters. The eastern part of Dizmar was declared a part of Khoda Afarin County in 2011 and Mardanaqom was designated as its capital.

=== 2024 Varzaqan helicopter crash ===
Iranian President Ebrahim Raisi died in a helicopter crash in Dizmar National Park, along with eight others, including the Minister of Foreign Affairs, Hossein Amir Abdollahian. The crash occurred around 1:00 PM on 19 May 2024.

== Demographics ==
=== Population ===
At the time of the 2006 National Census, the rural district's population (as a part of the former Khoda Afarin District in Kaleybar County) was 2,888 in 641 households. There were 3,097 inhabitants in 865 households at the following census of 2011, by which time the district had been separated from the county in the establishment of Khoda Afarin County. The rural district was transferred to the new Manjavan District. The 2016 census measured the population of the rural district as 2,760 in 867 households. The most populous of its 22 villages was Marzabad, with 742 people.

=== Other villages in the rural district ===
- Ahmadabad
- Darani
- Kalaleh Eslami
- Owli
