= Ojaq Kandi, Hashtrud =

Ojaq Kandi اجاق كندي
- Village
- Location within Iran
- Coordinates: 37°19′16″N 46°43′42″E
- Country: Iran
- Province: East Azerbaijan
- County: Hashtrud
- Bakhsh: Nazarkahrizi
- Rural District: Nazarkahrizi

Population (2006)
  - Total: 91
- Time zone: UTC+3:30 (IRST)
  - Summer (DST): UTC+4:30 (IRDT)

Ojaq Kandi (Persian: اجاق كندي, also Romanized as Ojāq Kandī) is a village in Nazarkahrizi Rural District, Nazarkahrizi District, Hashtrud County, East Azerbaijan Province, Iran. At the 2006 census, its population was 91, in 22 families.
