= Bastamlu Rural District =

Rural district in East Azerbaijan province, Iran

Bastamlu Rural District Persian: دهستان بسطاملو
- Rural District
- Location within Iran
- Coordinates: 39°13′N 47°09′E
- Country: Iran
- Province: East Azerbaijan
- County: Khoda Afarin
- District: Central
- Capital: Bastamlu

Population (2016)
  - Total: 4,561
- Time zone: UTC+3:30 (IRST)

Bastamlu Rural District (Persian: دهستان بسطاملو) is in the Central District of Khoda Afarin County, East Azerbaijan province, Iran. Its capital is the village of Bastamlu.

== Demographics ==
=== Population ===
At the time of the 2006 National Census, the rural district's population (as a part of the former Khoda Afarin District in Kaleybar County) was 5,907 in 1,168 households. There were 5,407 inhabitants in 1,329 households at the following census of 2011, by which time the district had been separated from the county in the establishment of Khoda Afarin County. The rural district was transferred to the new Central District. The 2016 census measured the population of the rural district as 4,561 in 1,359 households. The most populous of its 27 villages was Aliverdi Owshaqi, with 675 people.

=== Other villages in the rural district ===
- Dowrmishkhanlu
- Eskanluy-ye Olya
- Eskanluy-ye Sofla
- Kadkhodalu-ye Bala
- Qoli Beyglu
