= Seyyedan Rural District =

Rural district in East Azerbaijan province, Iran

Seyyedan Rural District Persian: دهستان سيدان
- Rural District
- Location within Iran
- Coordinates: 39°01′N 47°12′E
- Country: Iran
- Province: East Azerbaijan
- County: Kaleybar
- District: Abesh Ahmad
- Established: 2000
- Capital: Oti Kandi

Population (2016)
  - Total: 2,649
- Time zone: UTC+3:30 (IRST)

Seyyedan Rural District (Persian: دهستان سيدان) is in Abesh Ahmad District of Kaleybar County, East Azerbaijan province, Iran. Its capital is the village of Oti Kandi.

== Demographics ==
=== Population ===
At the time of the 2006 National Census, the rural district's population was 4,336 in 926 households. There were 3,032 inhabitants in 841 households at the following census of 2011. The 2016 census measured the population of the rural district as 2,649 in 840 households. The most populous of its 19 villages was Oti Kandi, with 791 people.

=== Other villages in the rural district ===
- Aqamirlu
- Balan
- Haddadan
- Khalan
