= Chalabianlu (tribe) =

Turkophone Kurdish tribe in East Azerbaijan Province, Iran

Chalabianlu (Persian: چلبیانلو) is a Turkophone Kurdish tribe, dwelling for the most part in the Garamduz District of Arasbaran region, in East Azerbaijan Province of Iran.

== History ==
The Chalabianlu tribe migrated from Kurdistan to the Arasbaran region during the era of Ismail Shah through Naqadeh. In Arasbaran, they were known as "Dil Bilmez" among the Turkic population, meaning "Those who do not know our language" but gradually began speaking Turkic.

In 1810_1811, the tribe rebelled and crossed the Aras River towards the Mugan plain, but were forced to return to Arasbaran. During the era of Naser al-Din Shah Qajar, the most notorious bandit in the country was the chief of the Chalabianlu tribe, Rahim Khan.

In the wake of the Russo-Persian War from 1804 to 1813, the Chalabianlu was the second largest tribe of Arasbaran with 1500 tents and houses. The tribe was a staunch supporter of Mozaffar ad-Din Shah Qajar during the Persian Constitutional Revolution.

In 1960, the tribe comprised 1,974 households and, by then, nearly all were sedentary.

== Bibliography ==
- Oberling, Pierre (1964), "The Tribes of Qaraca Dag: A Brief History", Oriens, 17: 60–95, doi:10.2307/1580019, ISSN 0078-6527, JSTOR 1580019
