= Qeshlaq Rural District (Kaleybar County) =

Rural district in East Azerbaijan province, Iran

Qeshlaq Rural District Persian: دهستان قشلاق
- Rural District
- Location within Iran
- Coordinates: 39°11′N 47°22′E
- Country: Iran
- Province: East Azerbaijan
- County: Kaleybar
- District: Abesh Ahmad
- Established: 2000
- Capital: Qarah Qayah

Population (2016)
  - Total: 4,933
- Time zone: UTC+3:30 (IRST)

Qeshlaq Rural District (Persian: دهستان قشلاق) is in Abesh Ahmad District of Kaleybar County, East Azerbaijan province, Iran. Its capital is the village of Qarah Qayah.

== Demographics ==
=== Population ===
At the time of the 2006 National Census, the rural district's population was 6,468 in 1,320 households. There were 5,250 inhabitants in 1,327 households at the following census of 2011. The 2016 census measured the population of the rural district as 4,933 in 1,431 households. The most populous of its 29 villages was Qarah Qayah, with 714 people.

=== Other villages in the rural district ===
- Qarah Vanlu
- Qush Qayahsi
- Shamlu-ye Bozorg
