= Abesh Ahmad Rural District =

Rural district in East Azerbaijan province, Iran

Abesh Ahmad Rural District Persian: دهستان آبش احمد
- Rural District
- Location within Iran
- Coordinates: 39°06′N 47°23′E
- Country: Iran
- Province: East Azerbaijan
- County: Kaleybar
- District: Abesh Ahmad
- Established: 1987
- Capital: Abesh Ahmad

Population (2016)
  - Total: 11,531
- Time zone: UTC+3:30 (IRST)

Abesh Ahmad Rural District (Persian: دهستان آبش احمد) is in Abesh Ahmad District of Kaleybar County, East Azerbaijan province, Iran. It is administered from the city of Abesh Ahmad.

== Demographics ==
=== Population ===
At the time of the 2006 National Census, the rural district's population was 11,989 in 2,536 households. There were 11,585 inhabitants in 2,760 households at the following census of 2011. The 2016 census measured the population of the rural district as 11,531 in 3,253 households. The most populous of its 46 villages was Najaf-e Tarakomeh, with 1,405 people.

=== Other villages in the rural district ===
- Allulu
- Amirabad
- Delavaran
- Kalantar
- Lomeh Daraq
- Qaleh Kandi
