= Abesh Ahmad District =

District in East Azerbaijan province, Iran

Abesh Ahmad District Persian: بخش آبش احمد
- District
- Location within Iran
- Coordinates: 39°07′N 47°20′E
- Country: Iran
- Province: East Azerbaijan
- County: Kaleybar
- Established: 2000
- Capital: Abesh Ahmad

Population (2016)
  - Total: 21,828
- Time zone: UTC+3:30 (IRST)

Abesh Ahmad District (Persian: بخش آبش احمد) is in Kaleybar County, East Azerbaijan province, Iran. Its capital is the city of Abesh Ahmad.

== Demographics ==
=== Population ===
At the time of the 2006 National Census, the district's population was 25,122 in 5,308 households. The following census in 2011 counted 22,185 people in 5,519 households. The 2016 census measured the population of the district as 21,828 inhabitants in 6,313 households.

=== Administrative divisions ===
Abesh Ahmad District Population
Administrative Divisions	2006	2011	2016
Abesh Ahmad RD	11,989	11,585	11,531
Qeshlaq RD	6,468	5,250	4,933
Seyyedan RD	4,336	3,032	2,649
Abesh Ahmad (city)	2,329	2,318	2,715
Total	25,122	22,185	21,828
RD = Rural District
