= Kaleybar County =

County in East Azerbaijan province, Iran

Kaleybar County Persian: شهرستان کلیبر
- County
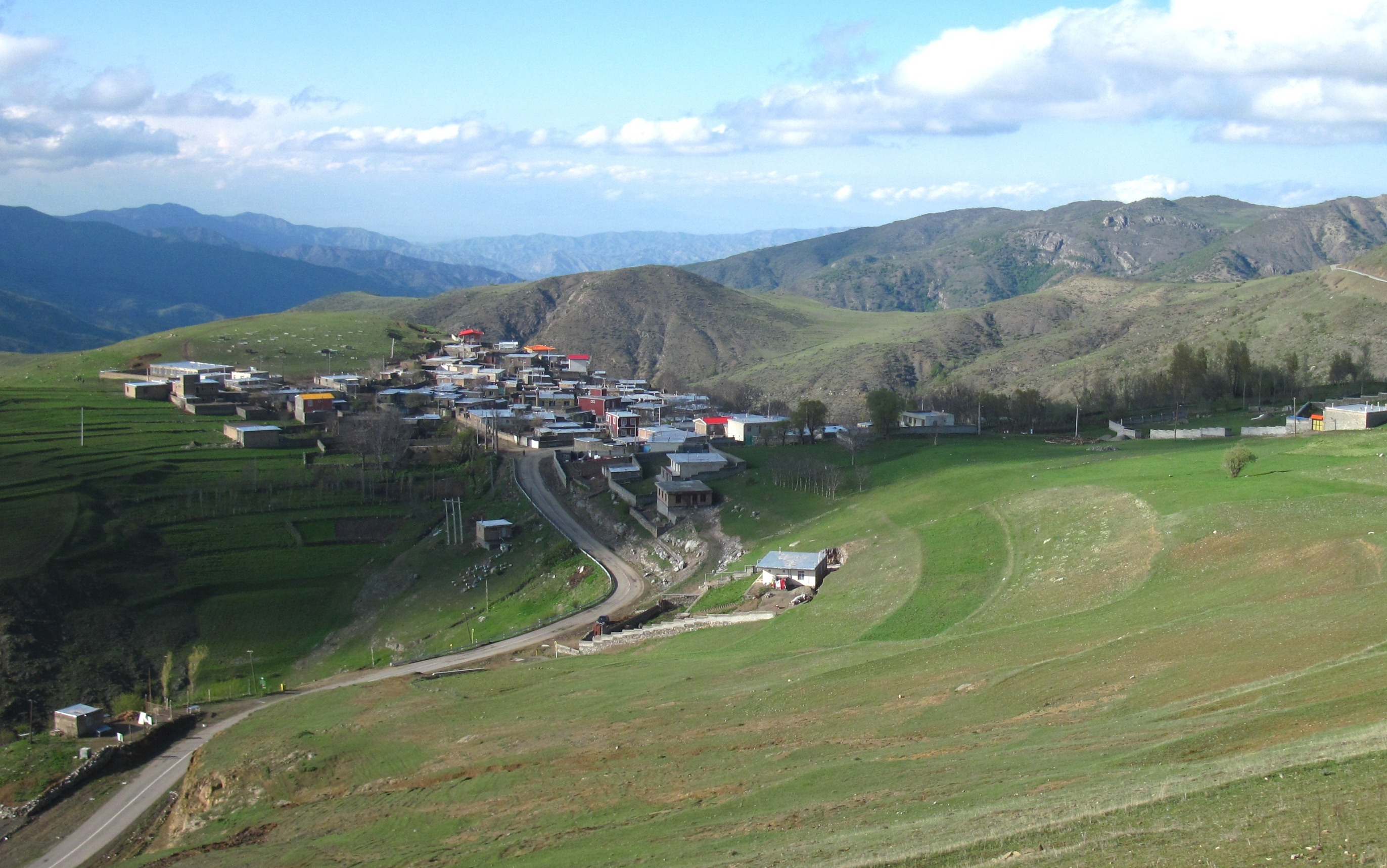
- The village of Aghuyeh

- Location of Kaleybar County in East Azerbaijan province (top right, pink)

- Location of East Azerbaijan province in Iran
- Coordinates: 38°56′N 47°06′E
- Country: Iran
- Province: East Azerbaijan
- Established: 1989
- Capital: Kaleybar
- Districts: Central, Abesh Ahmad

Population (2016)
  - Total: 46,125
- Time zone: UTC+3:30 (IRST)

Kaleybar County (Persian: شهرستان کلیبر) is in East Azerbaijan province, Iran. Its capital is the city of Kaleybar.

== History ==
In 2010, Khoda Afarin District was separated from the county in the establishment of Khoda Afarin County.

== Demographics ==
=== Population ===
At the time of the 2006 National Census, the county's population was 87,259, in 19,250 households. The following census in 2011 counted 48,837 people in 12,760 households. The 2016 census measured the population of the county as 46,125 in 14,145 households.

=== Administrative divisions ===
Kaleybar County's population history and administrative structure over three consecutive censuses are shown in the following table.

Kaleybar County Population
Administrative Divisions	2006	2011	2016
Central District	27,676	26,652	24,297
Misheh Pareh RD	3,034	3,137	2,757
Mulan RD	5,785	4,897	4,001
Peyghan Chayi RD	5,981	5,848	5,452
Yeylaq RD	3,846	2,883	2,763
Kaleybar (city)	9,030	9,887	9,324
Abesh Ahmad District	25,122	22,185	21,828
Abesh Ahmad RD	11,989	11,585	11,531
Qeshlaq RD	6,468	5,250	4,933
Seyyedan RD	4,336	3,032	2,649
Abesh Ahmad (city)	2,329	2,318	2,715
Khoda Afarin District (Note: Transferred to Khoda Afarin County)	34,461		
Bastamlu RD	5,907		
Dizmar-e Sharqi RD	2,888		
Garamduz RD	11,434		
Keyvan RD	2,905		
Minjavan-e Gharbi RD	4,378		
Minjavan-e Sharqi RD	5,727		
Khomarlu (city)	1,222		
Total	87,259	48,837	46,125
RD = Rural District

== Geography ==
In addition to the capital city, the county is noted for the Arasbaran forests protected area and the Bazz Galasi, the fortress of Babak Khorramdin.

== See also ==
Media related to Kaleybar County at Wikimedia Commons
