= Arasbaran =

Mountainous area in Iran, biosphere reserve

Coordinates: 38°40′N 47°00′E

UNESCO Biosphere Reserves in Iran

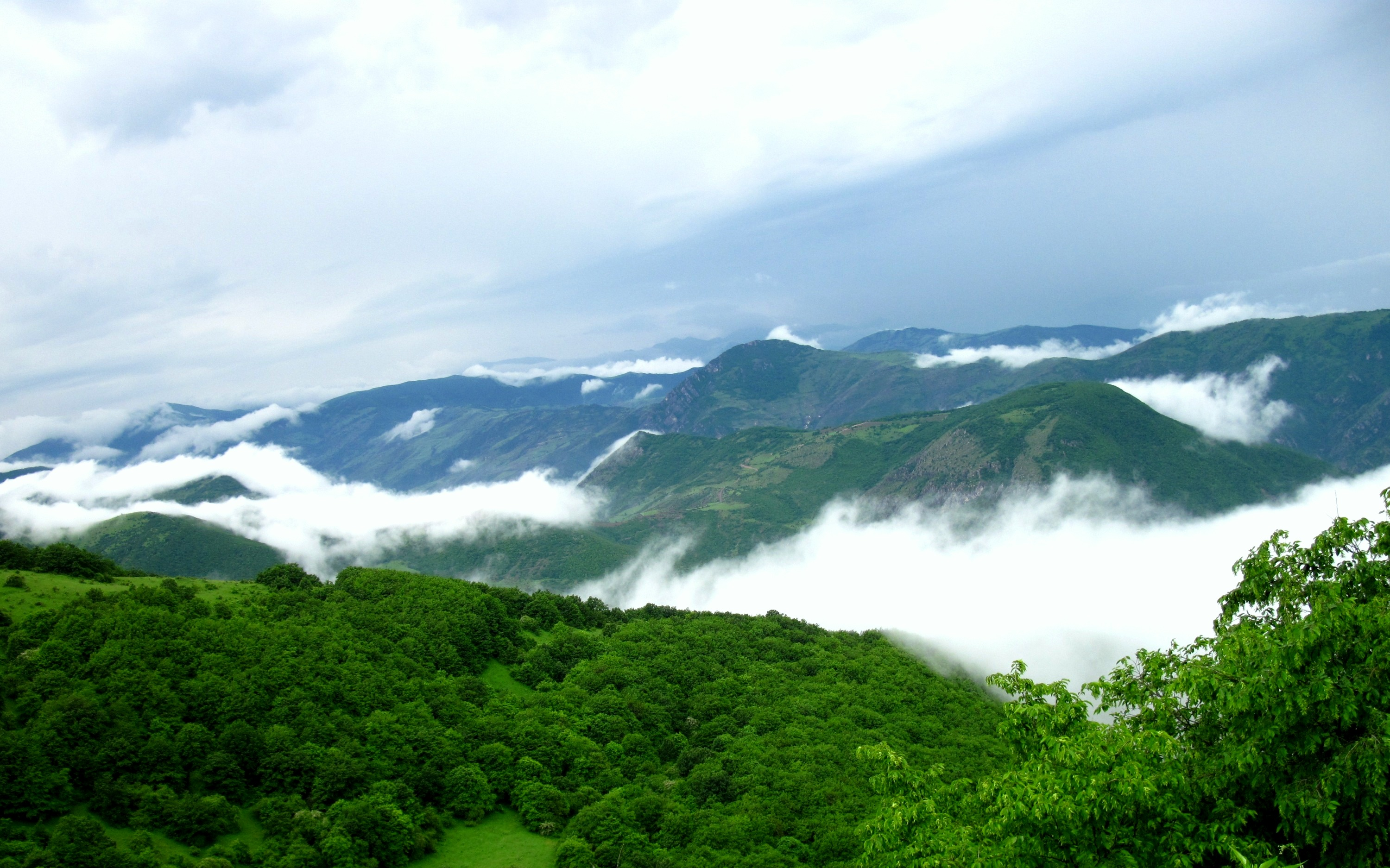
Mist-clad mountains

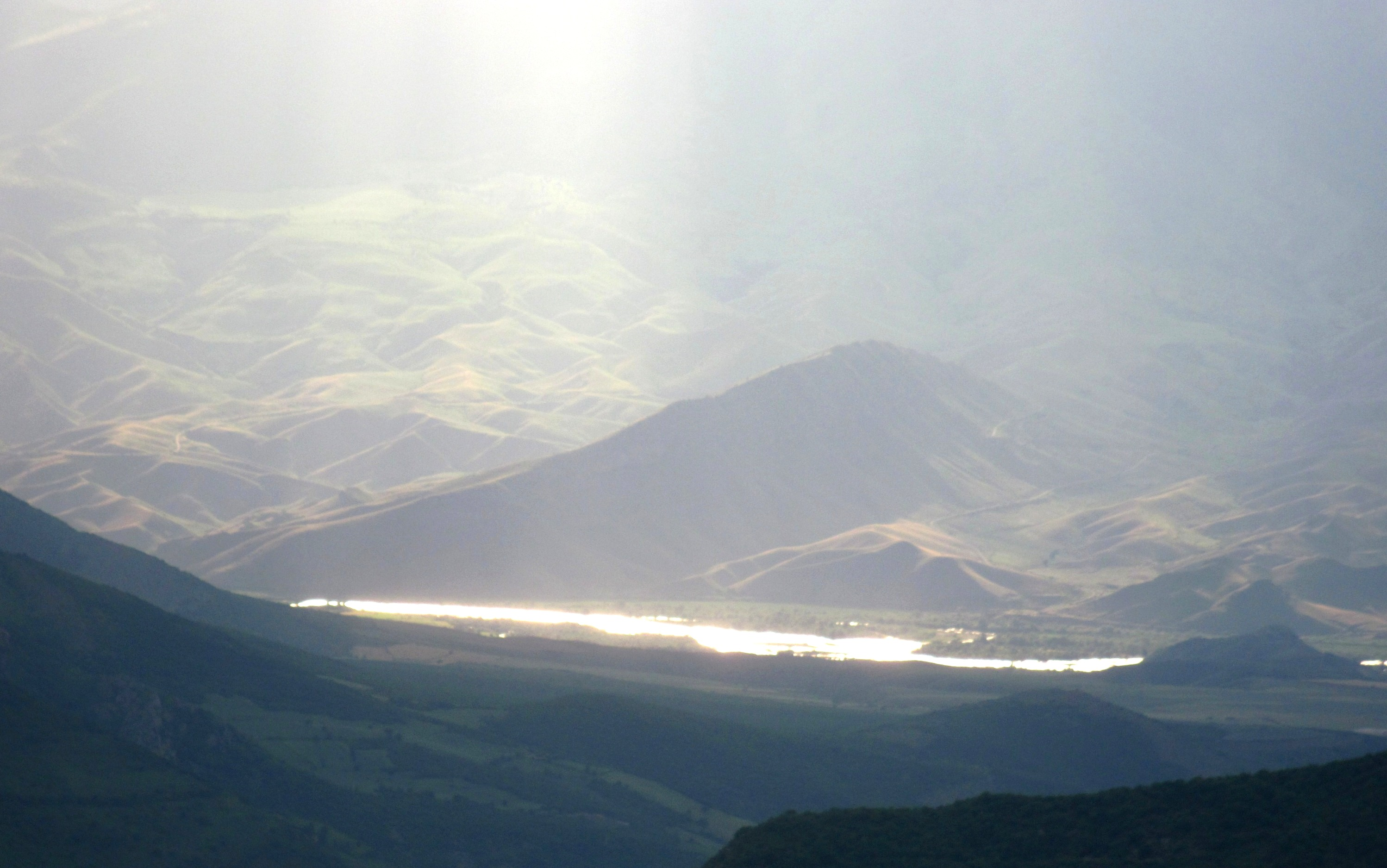
Sunset on Aras

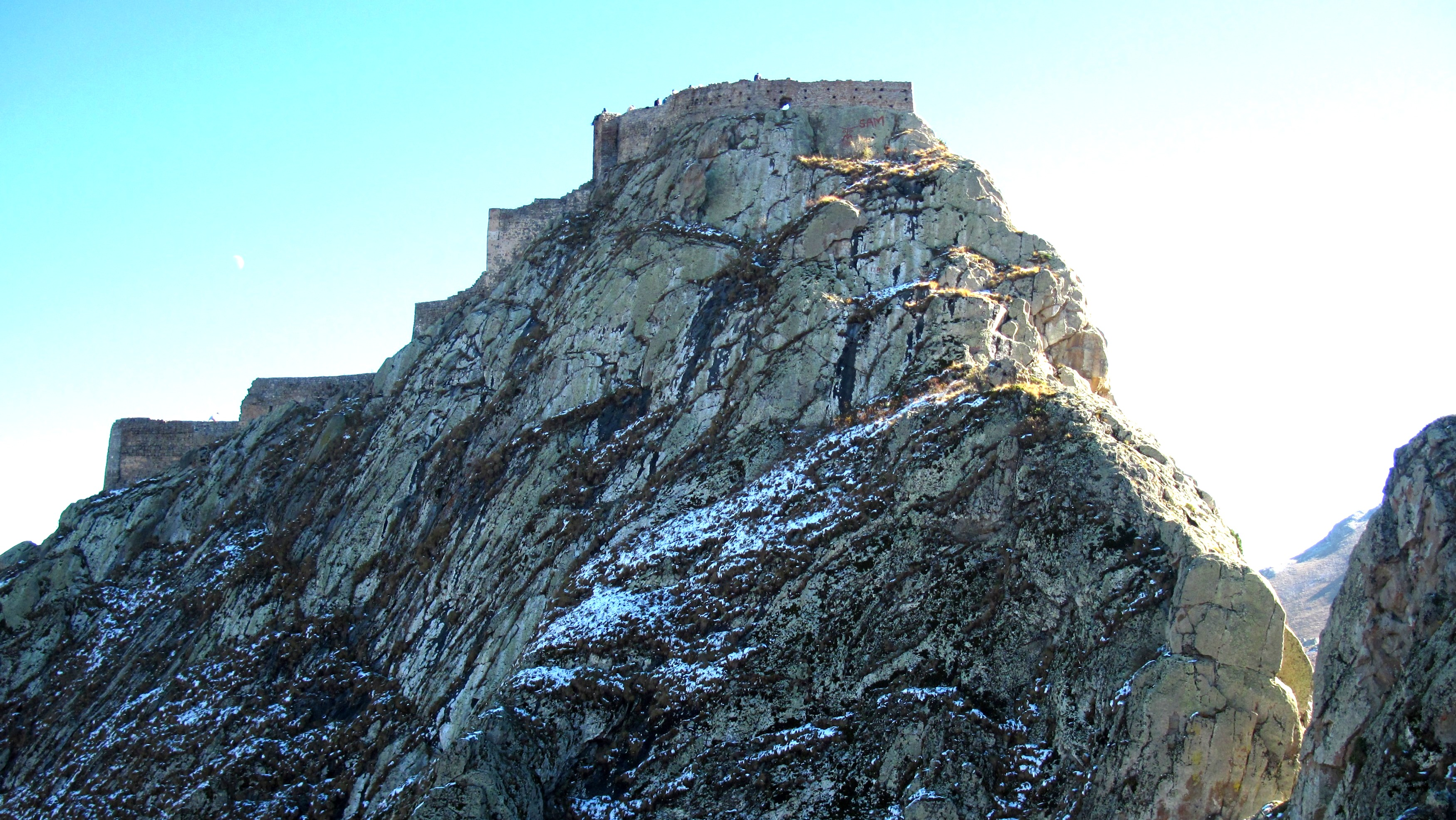
Babak Fort, near Kaleybar

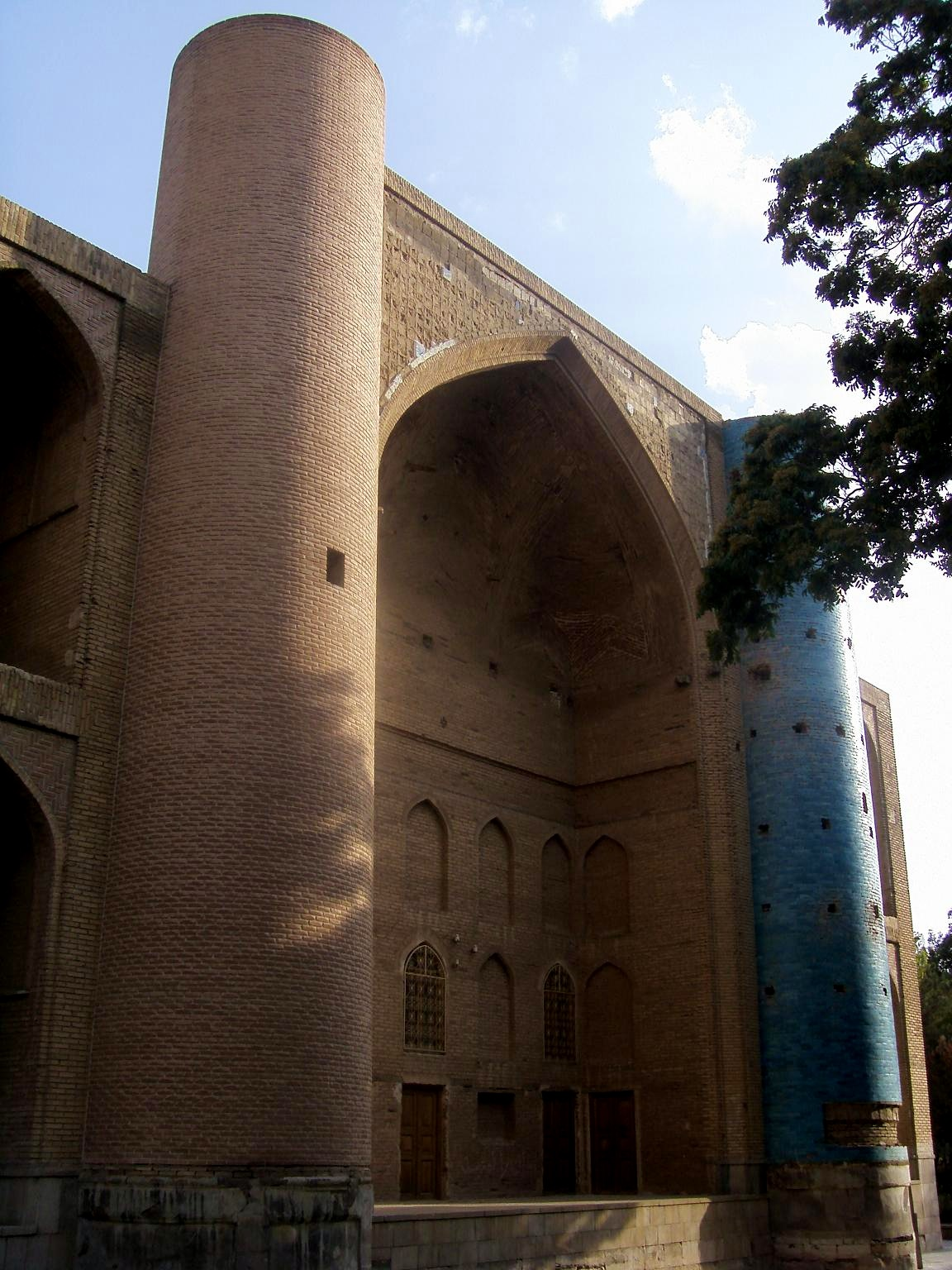
Sheikh-shahab tomb, Ahar, Iran

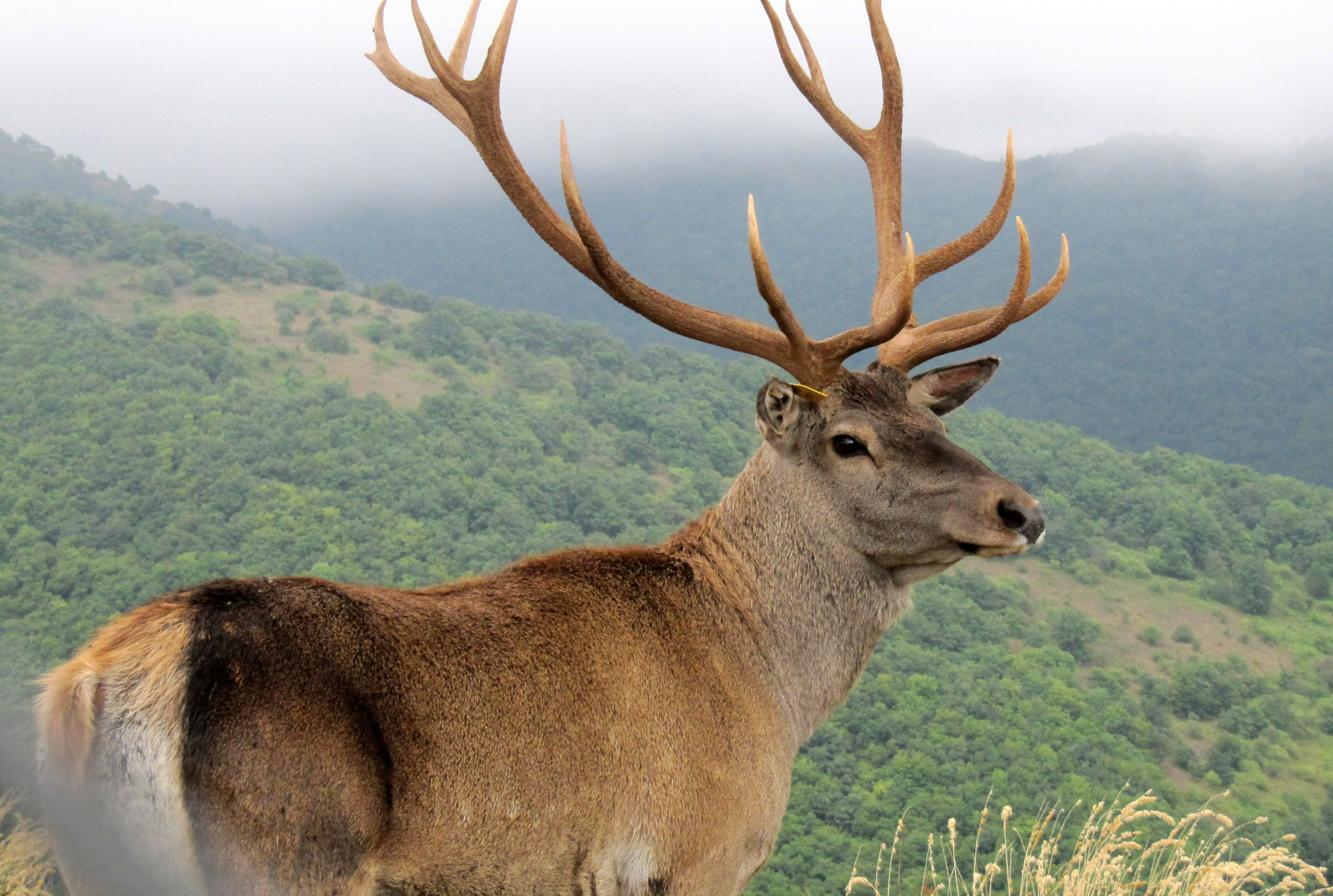
A Caspian red deer in Aynaloo forests

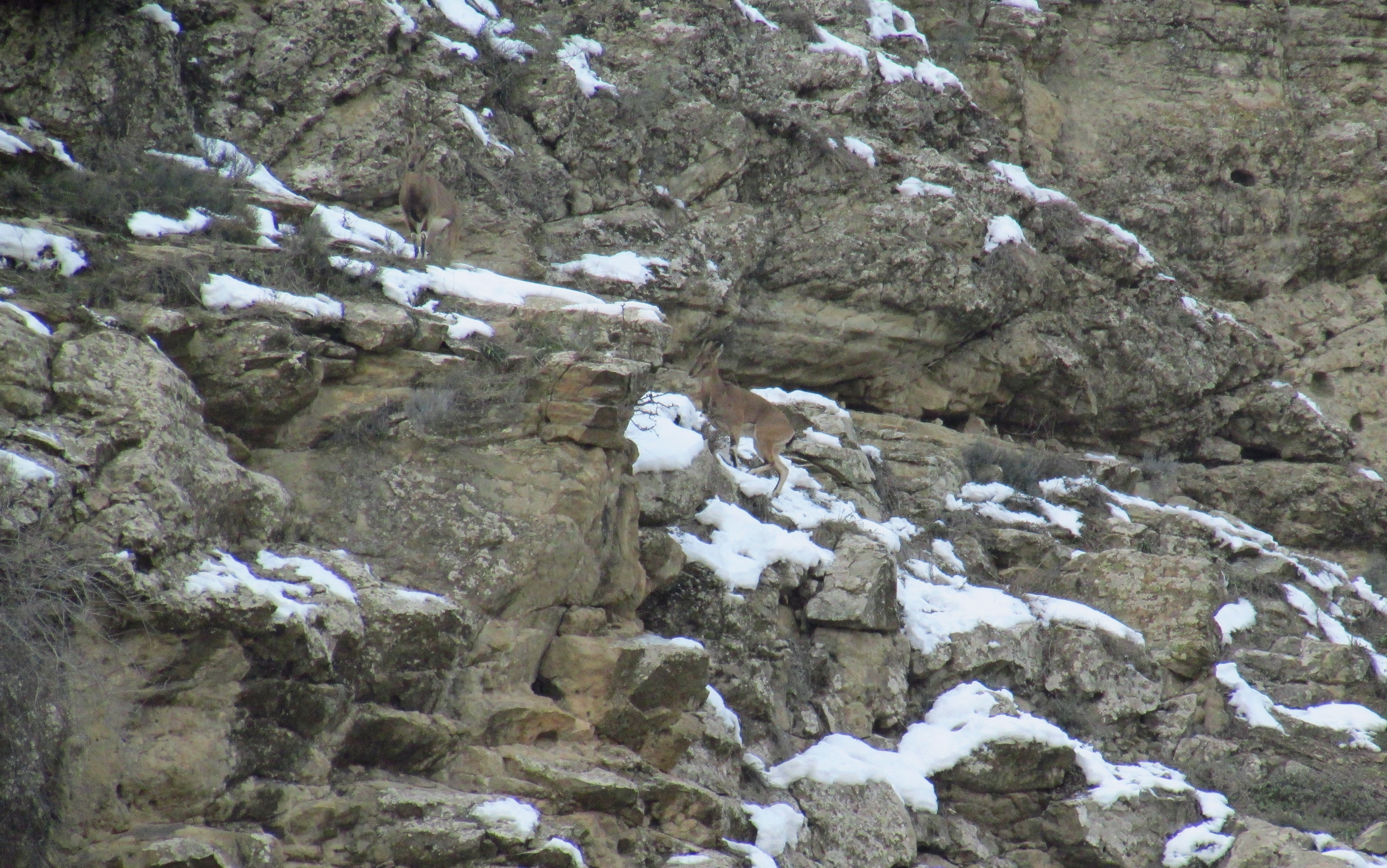
Two well camouflaged mountain goats near Emarat, East Azerbaijan village

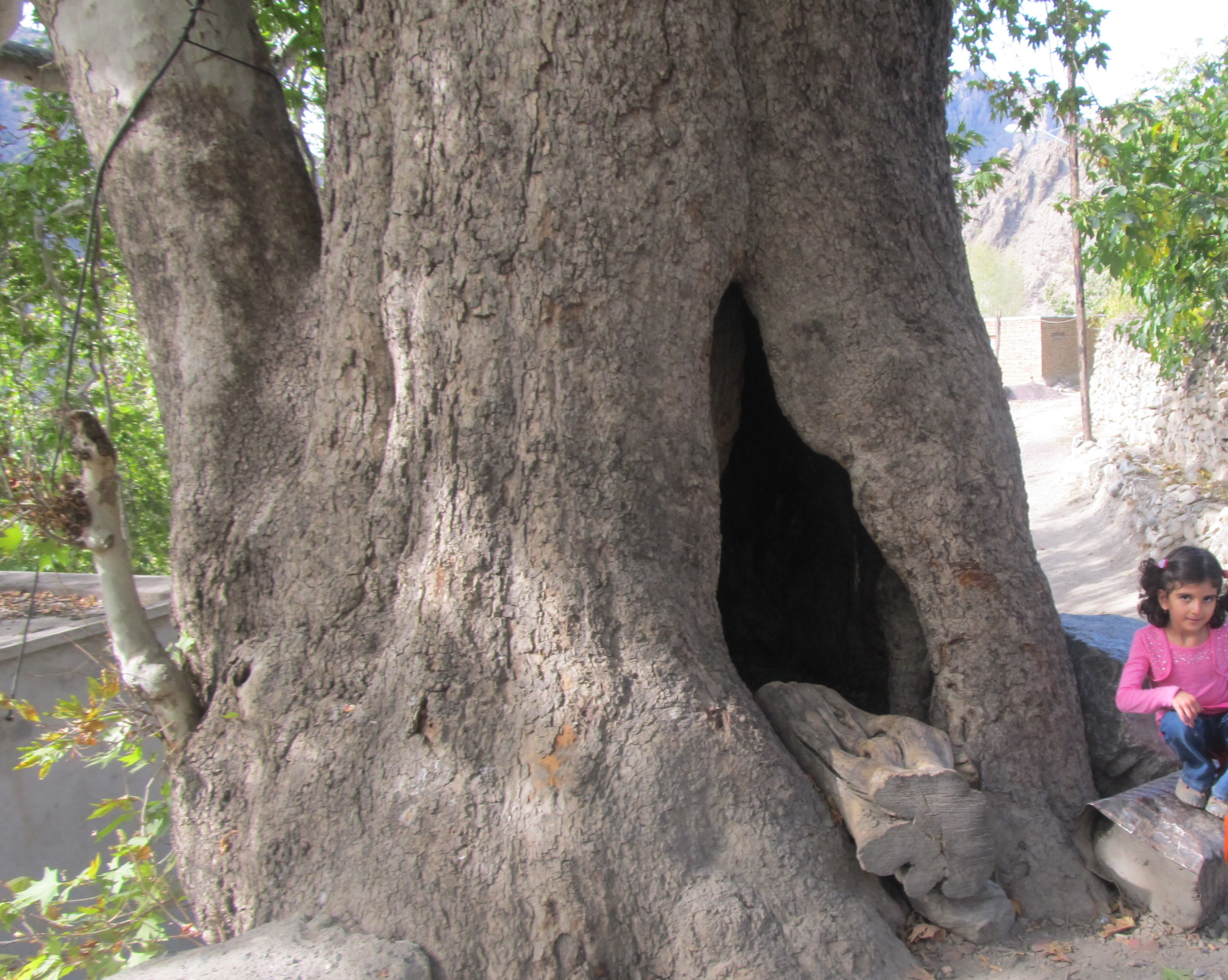
The landmark plane tree in Kavanaq

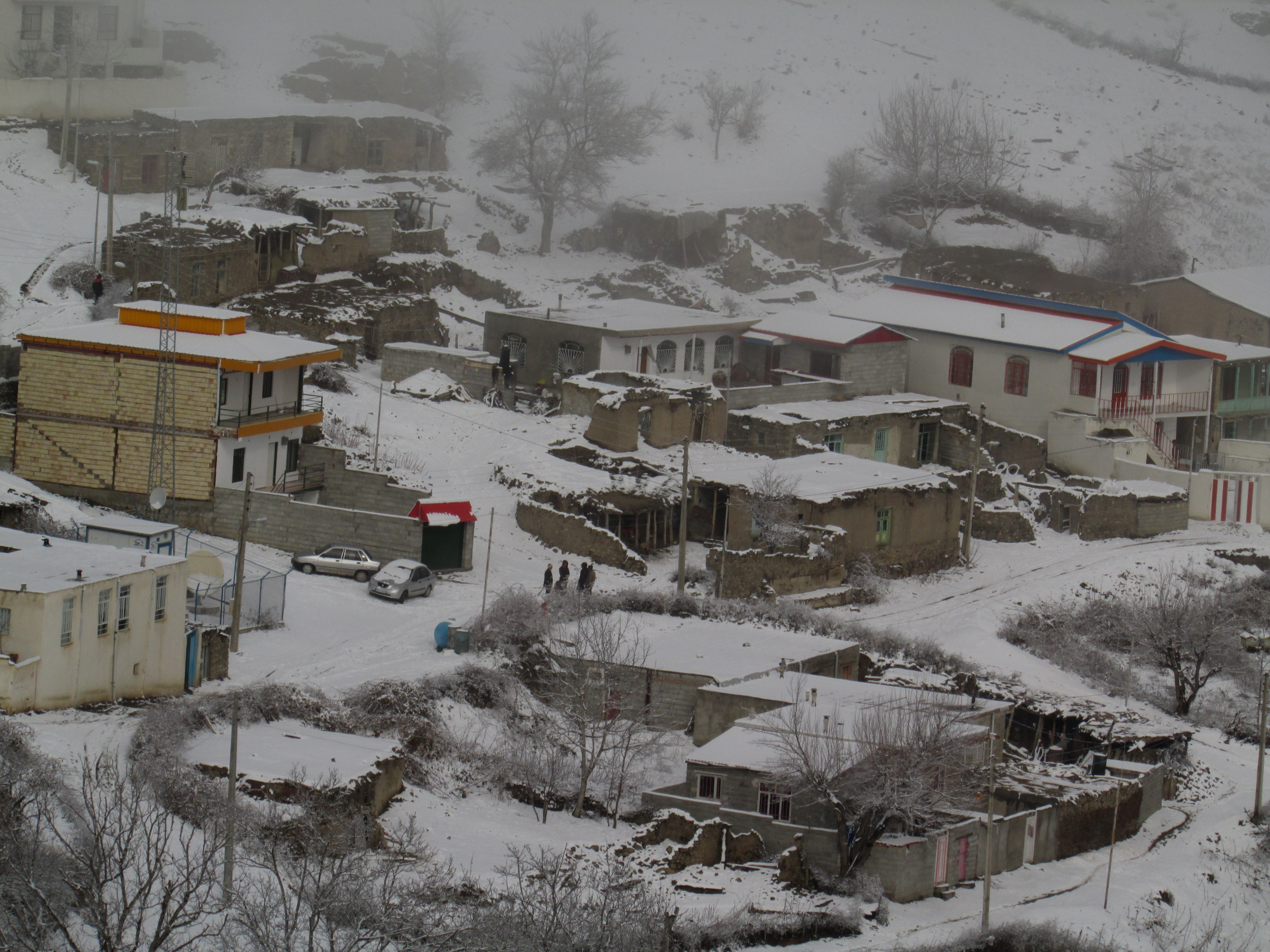
Abbasabad (2014). The construction of modern houses heralds the unexpected resurrection of Arasbaran.

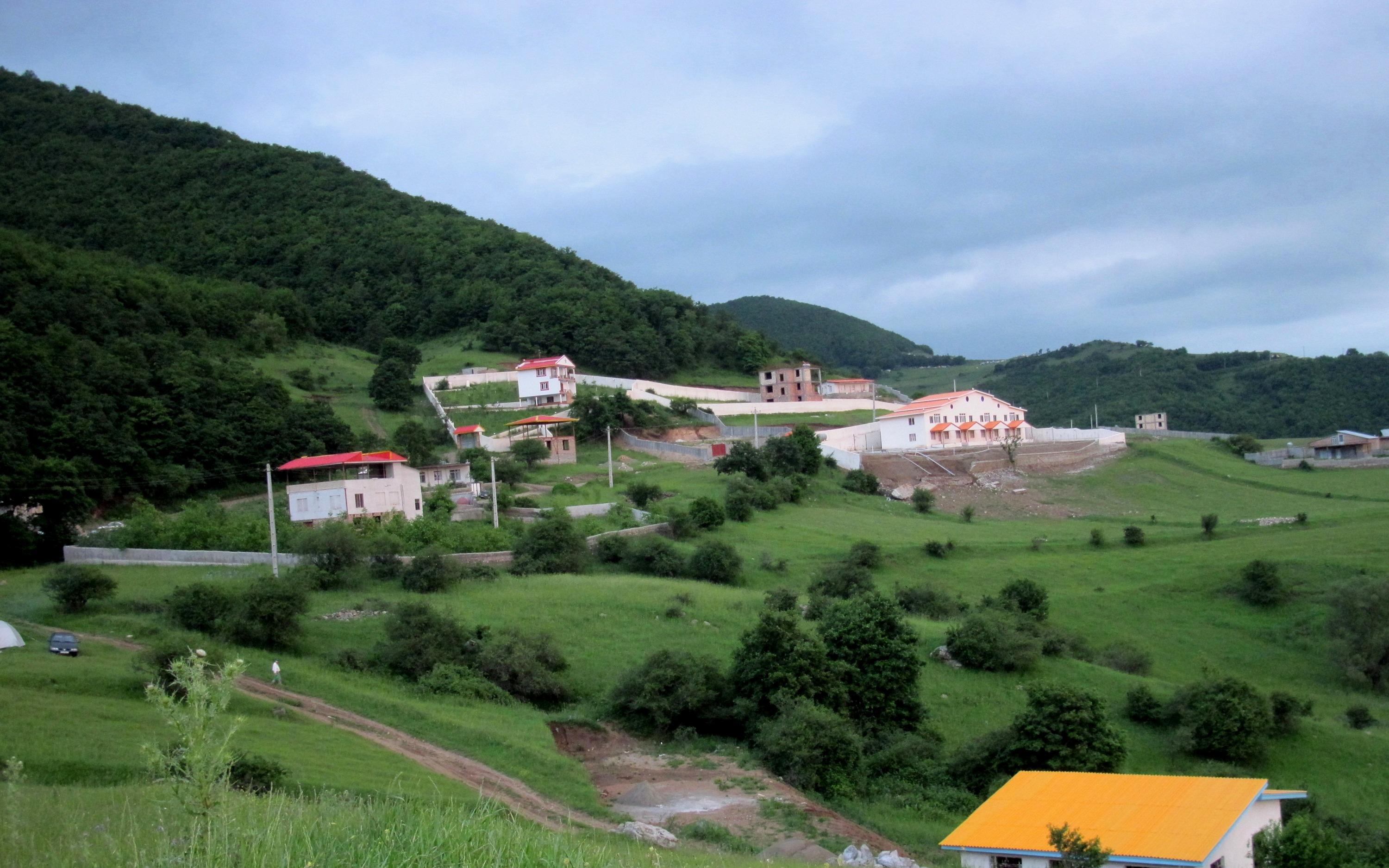
Reconstruction boom

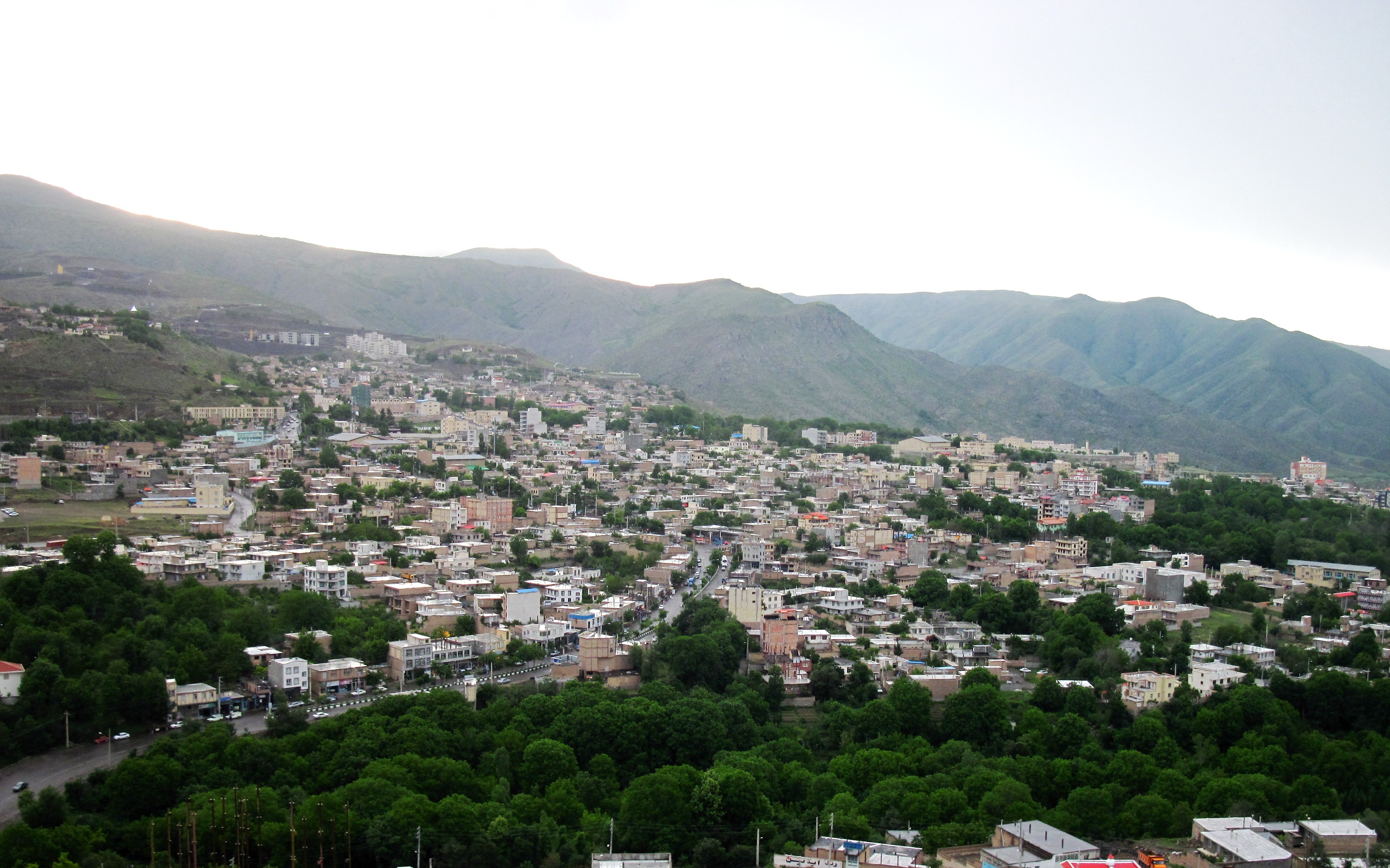
Kaleybar is becoming the unofficial capital of Arasbaran.

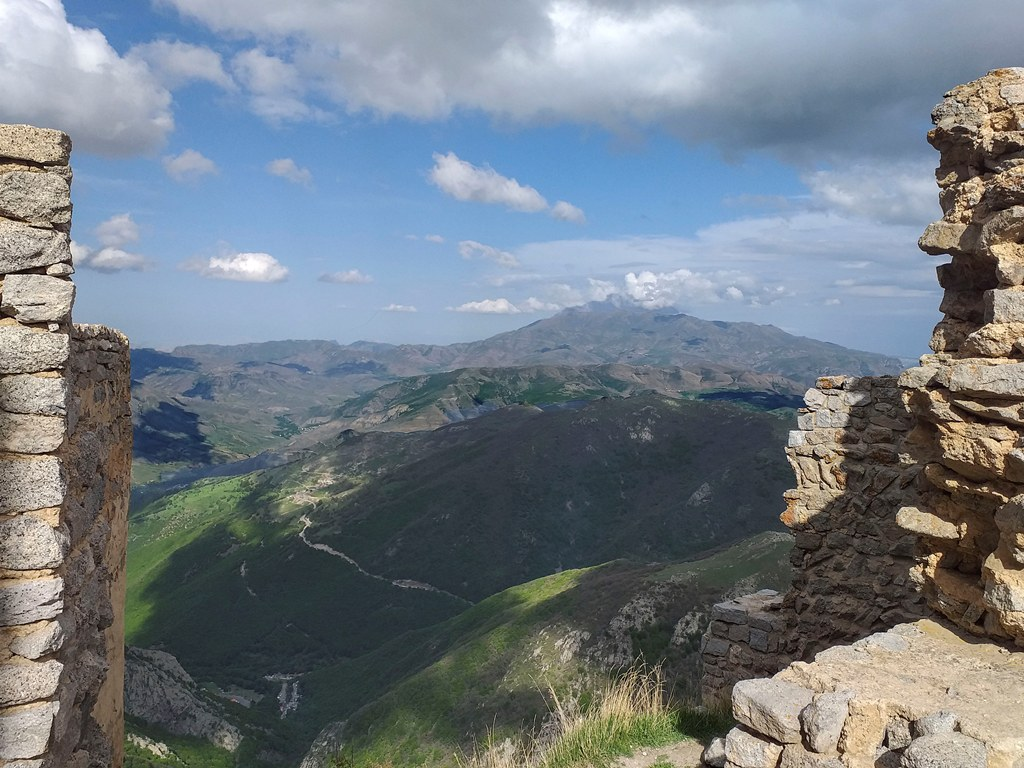
Kuh-e Qandaranbashi, seen from Babak Fort

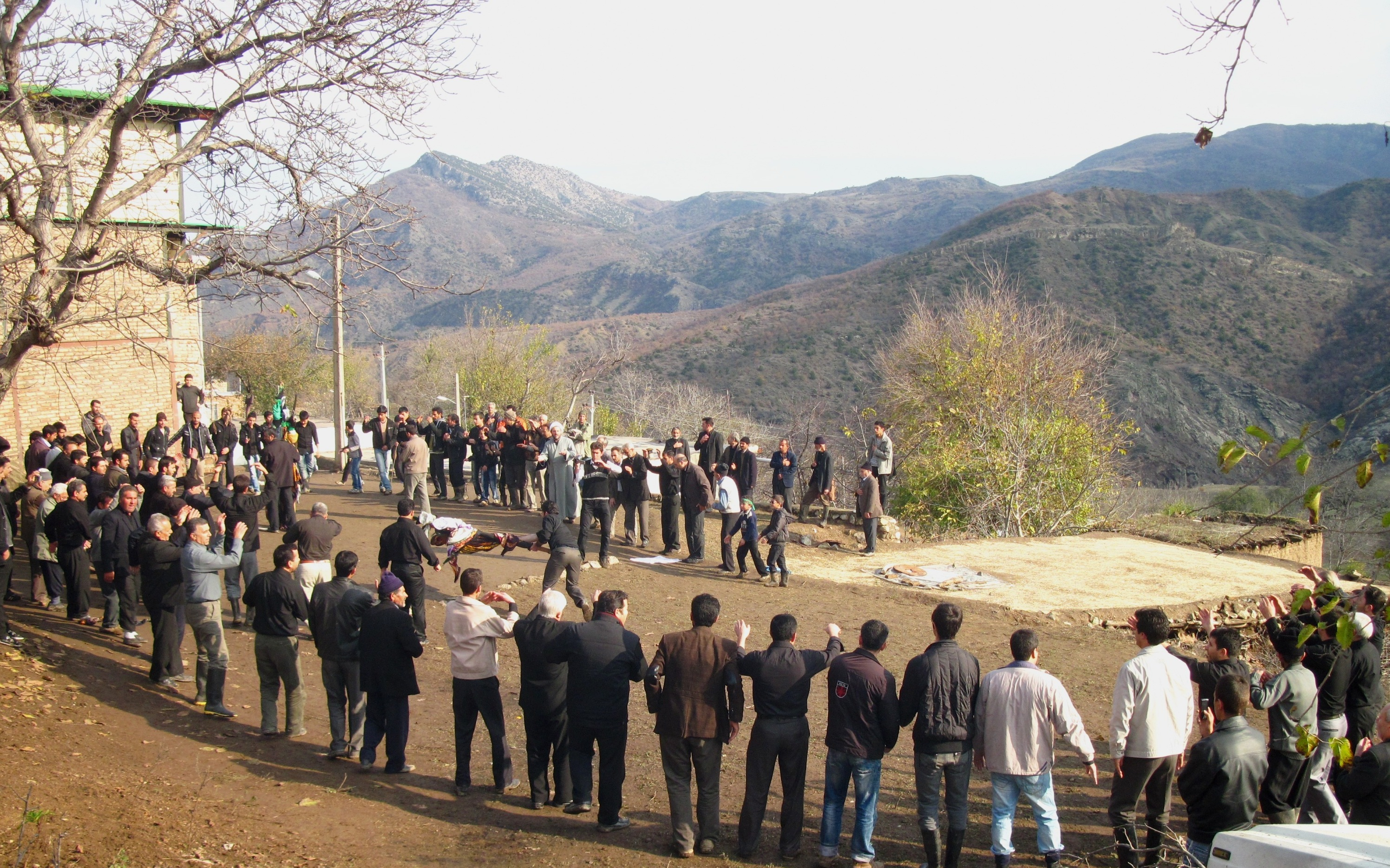
Two toğs are exhibited in an ashura ceremony for commemorating Imam Hossein's martyrdom (Alherd, 2012).

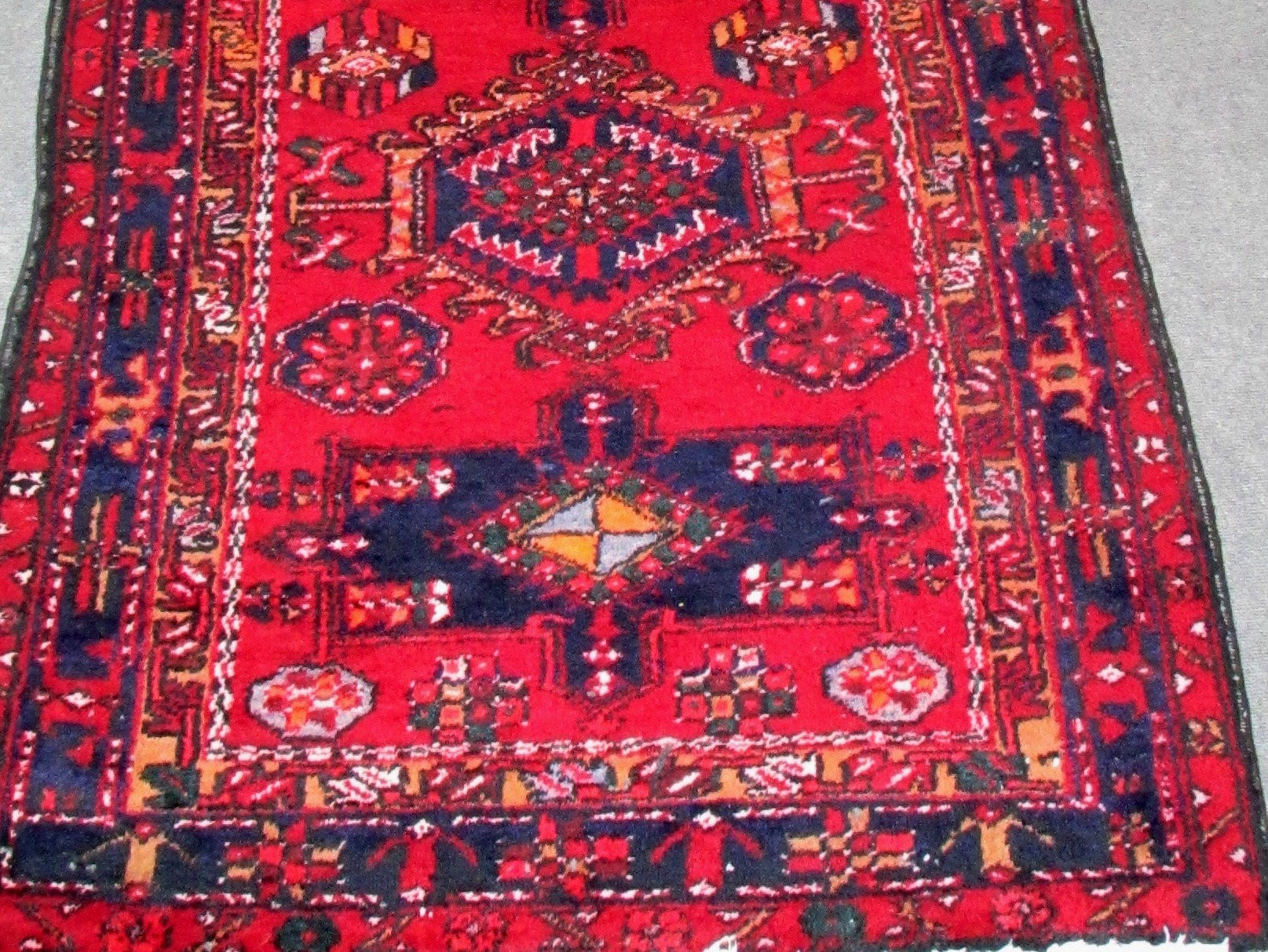
Balan rug

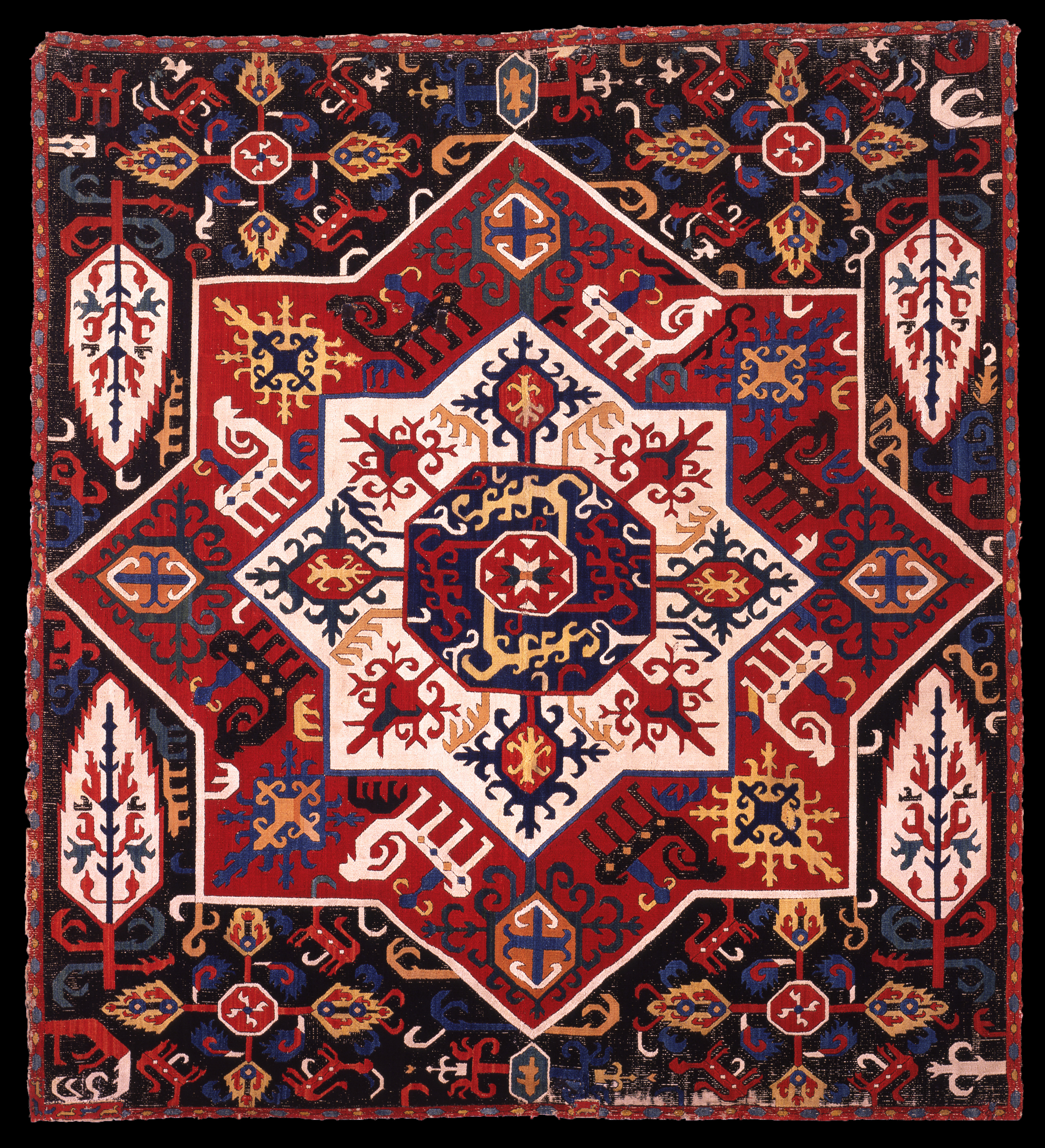
Verni

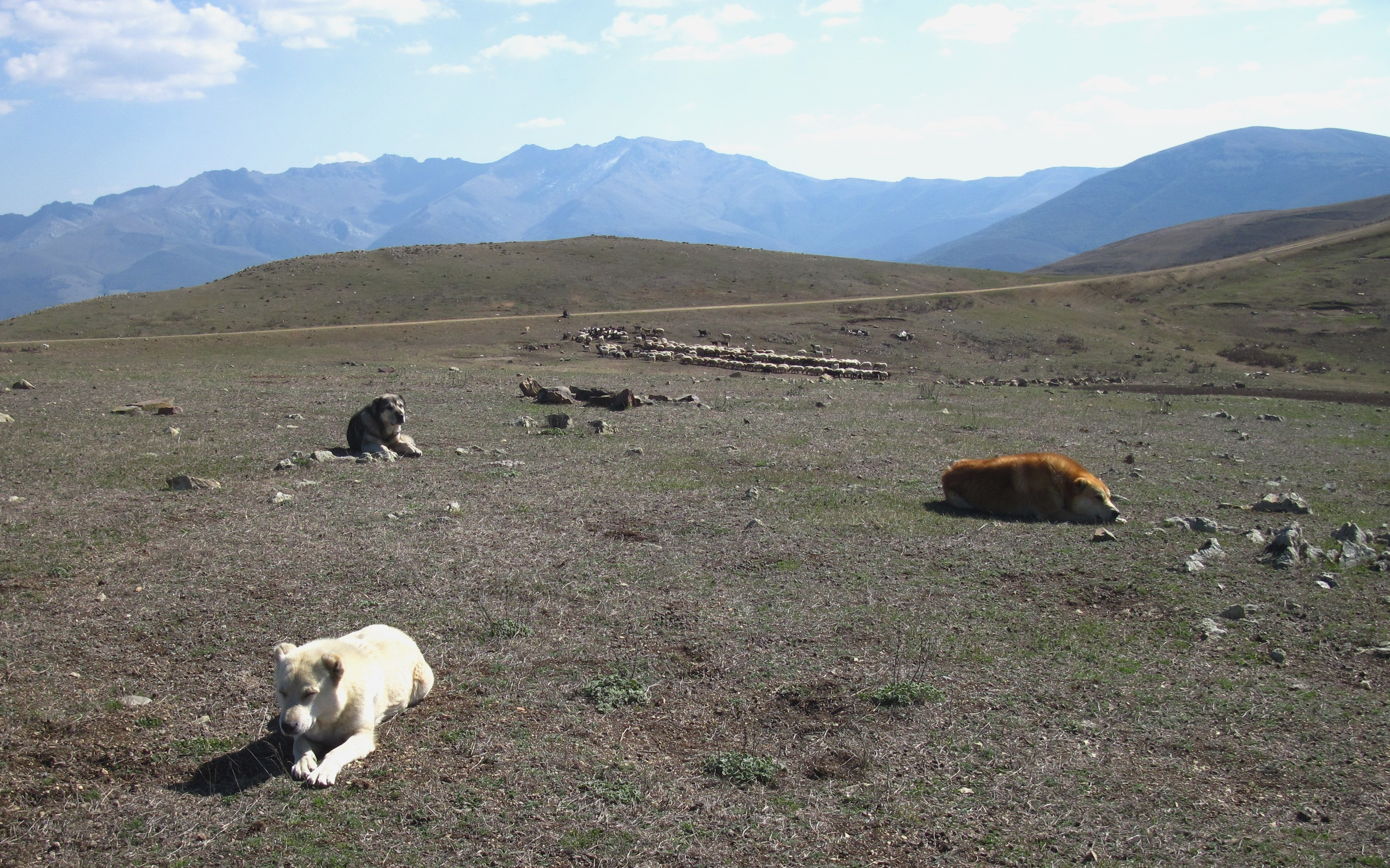
The aggressive shepherd dogs of Arasbaran are resting in Chaparli.

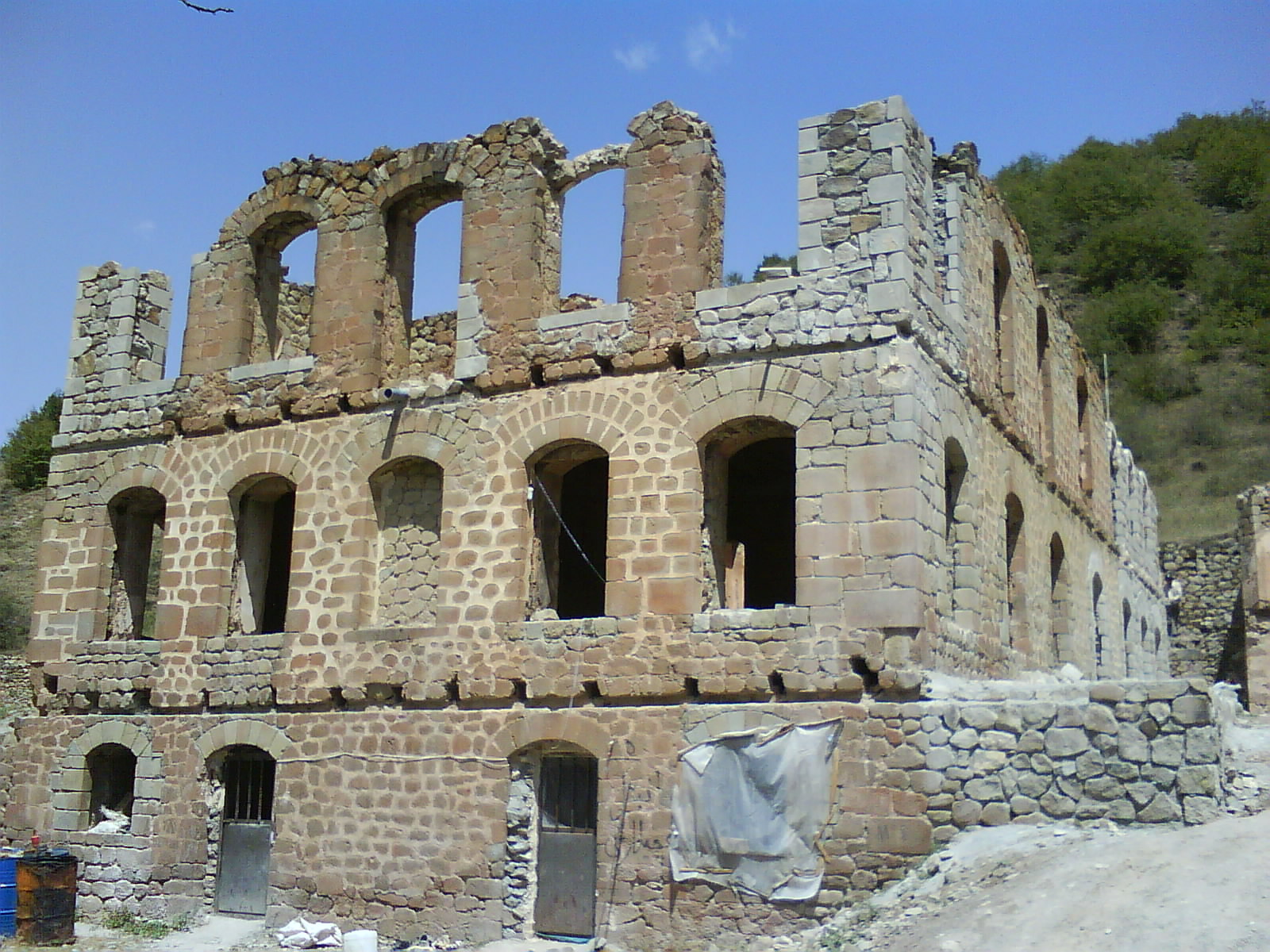
A historical landmark in Aynaloo

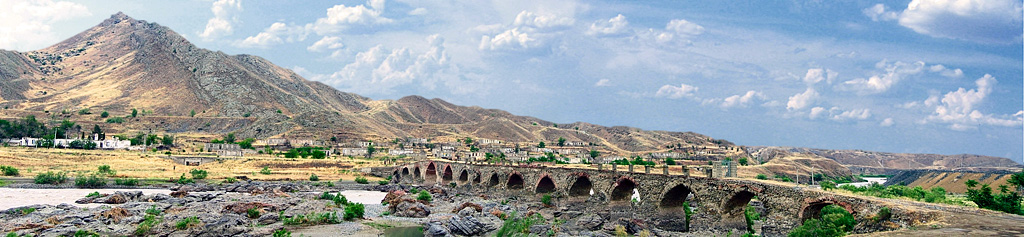
Historical Khoda Afarin bridge near Khomarlu

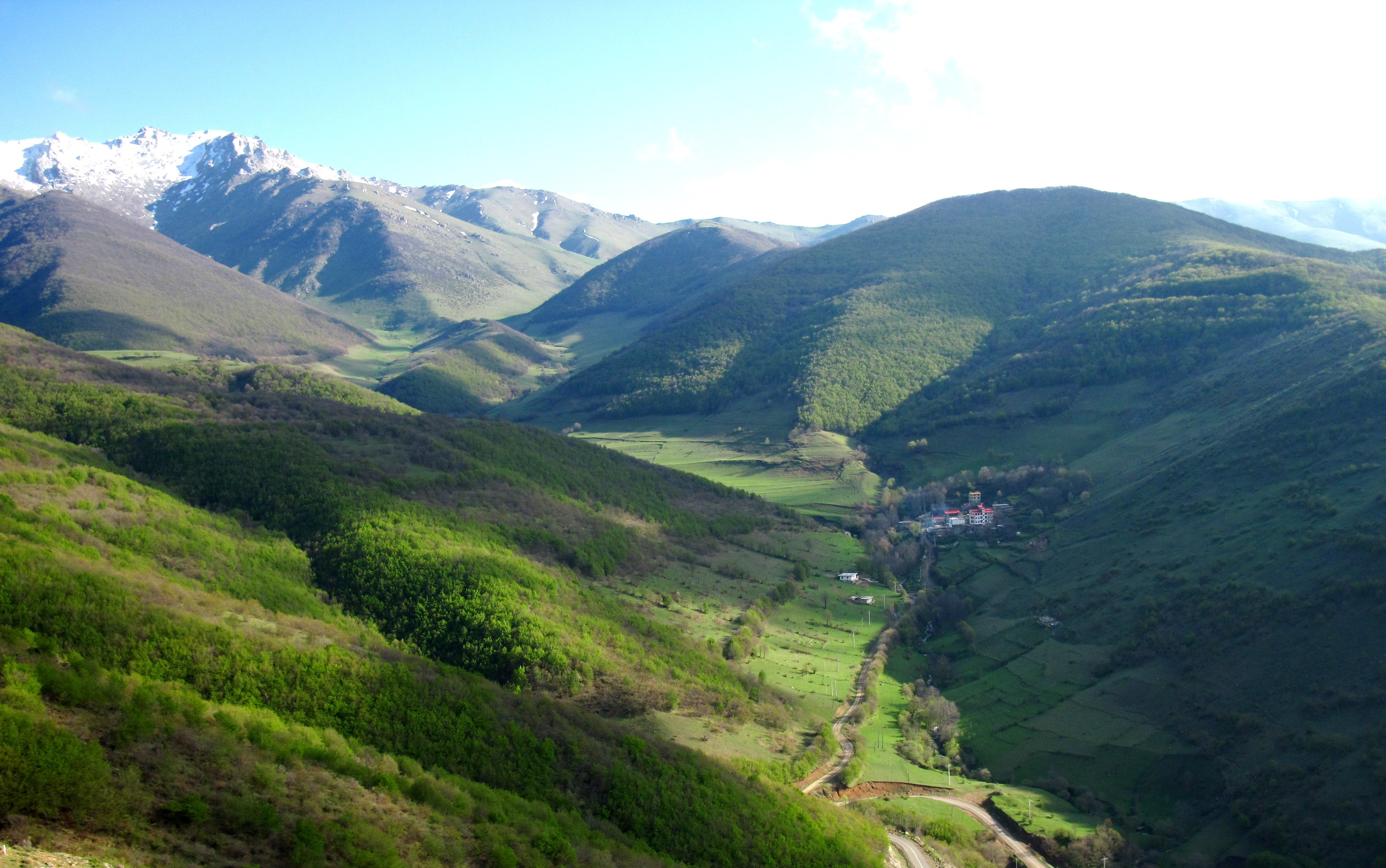
Mikandi Valley near Aliabad

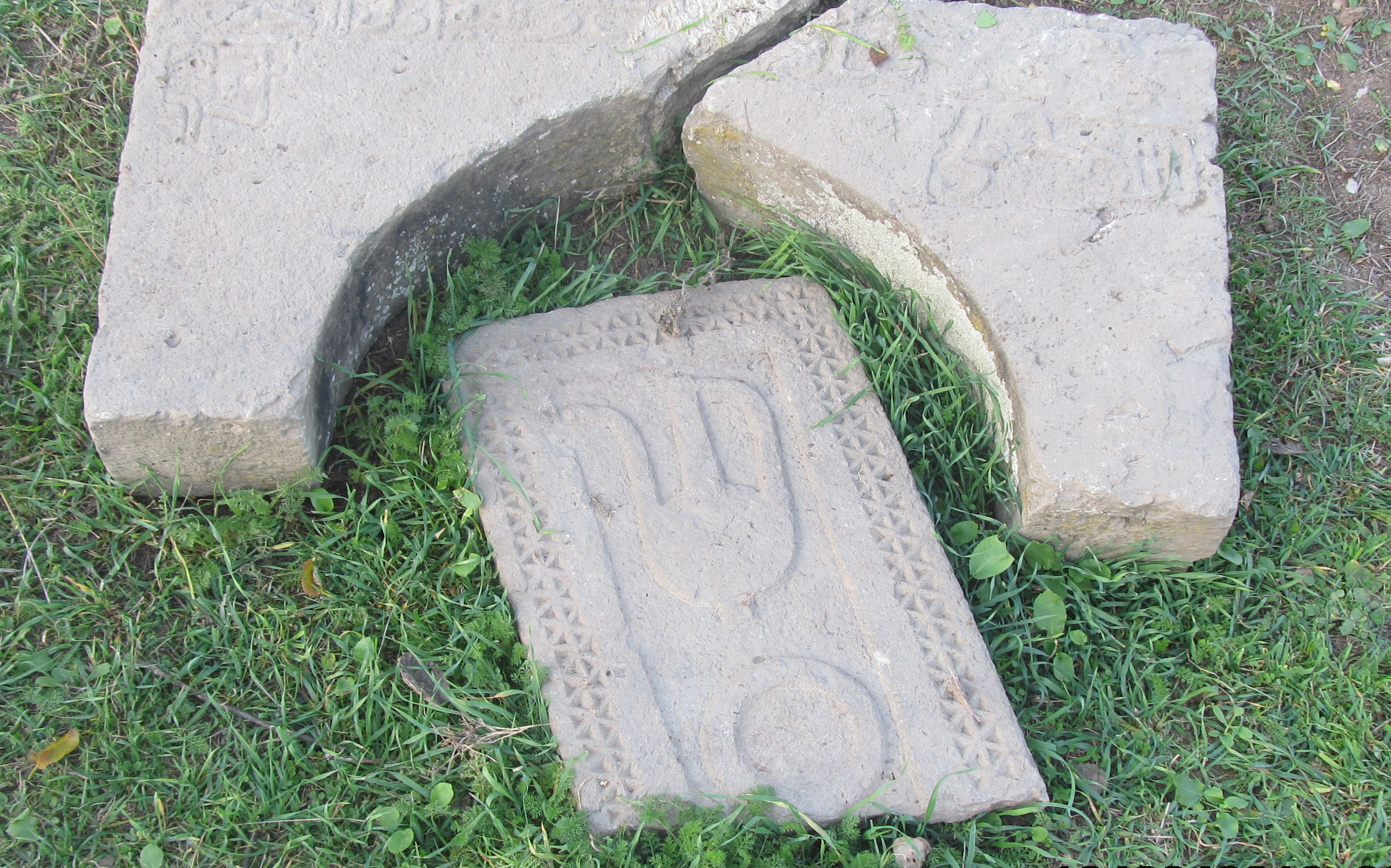
An old tombstone in a historic graveyard near Alherd

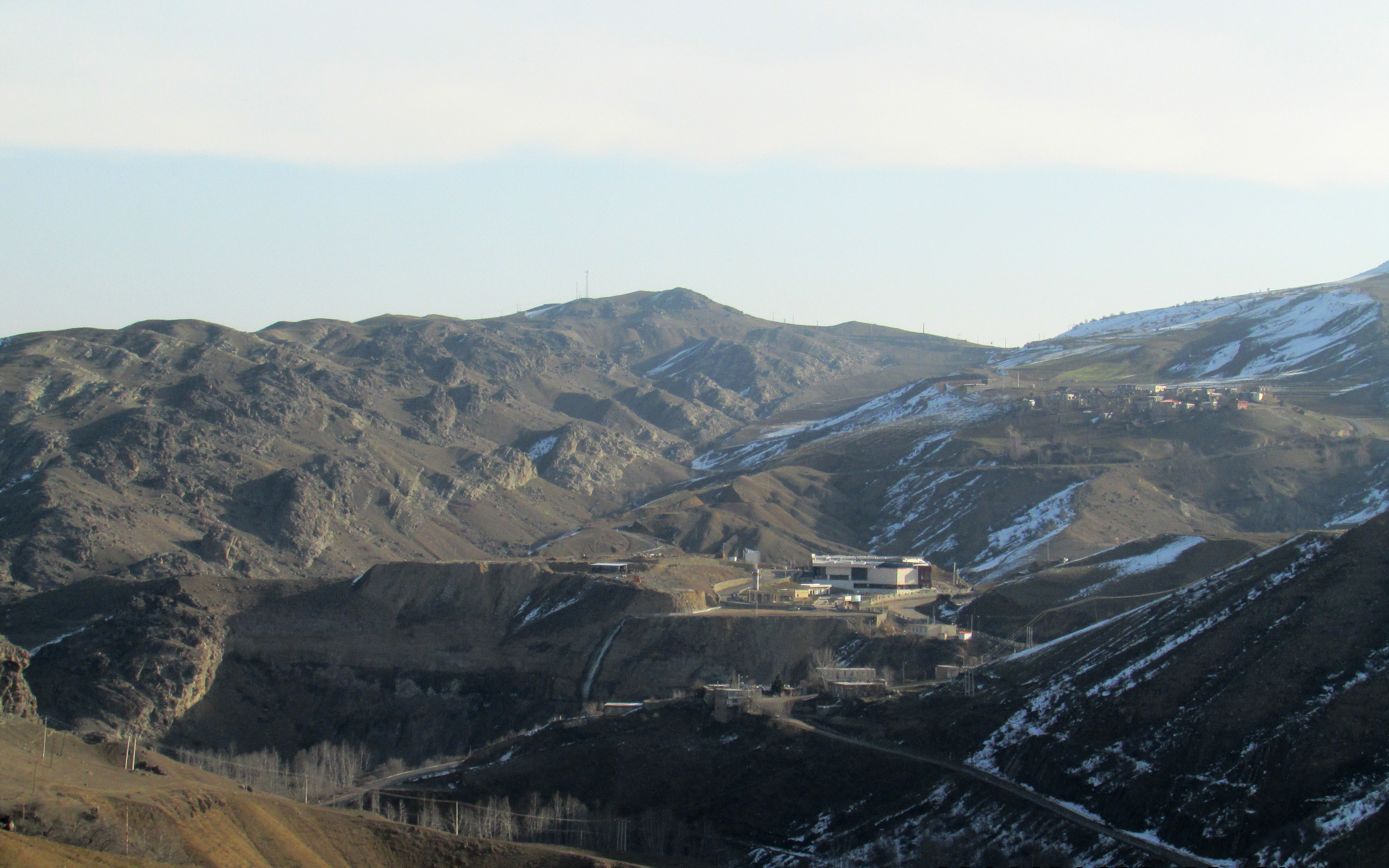
Hot spring therapeutic facility near Motaalleq

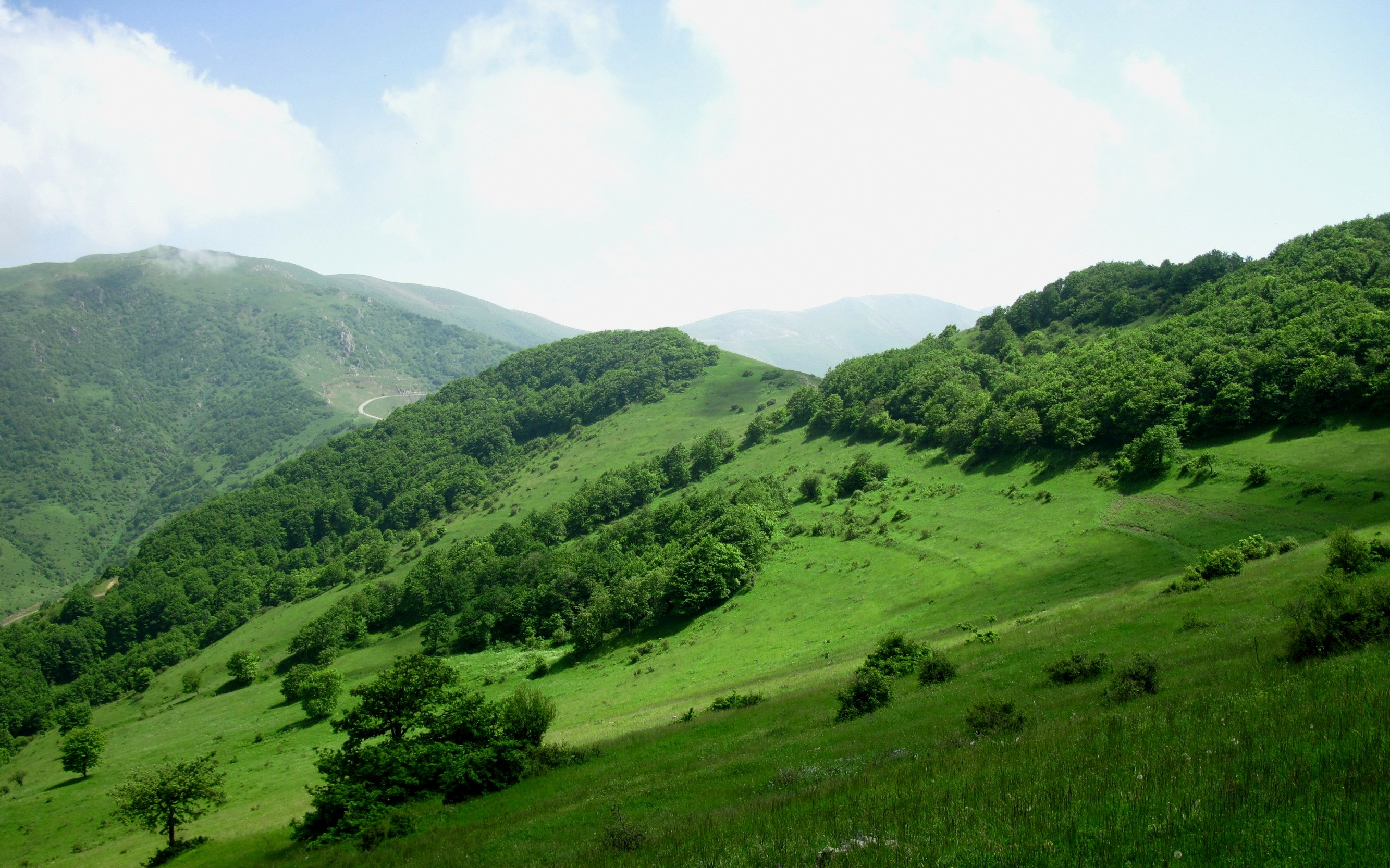
Aqdash summer camp

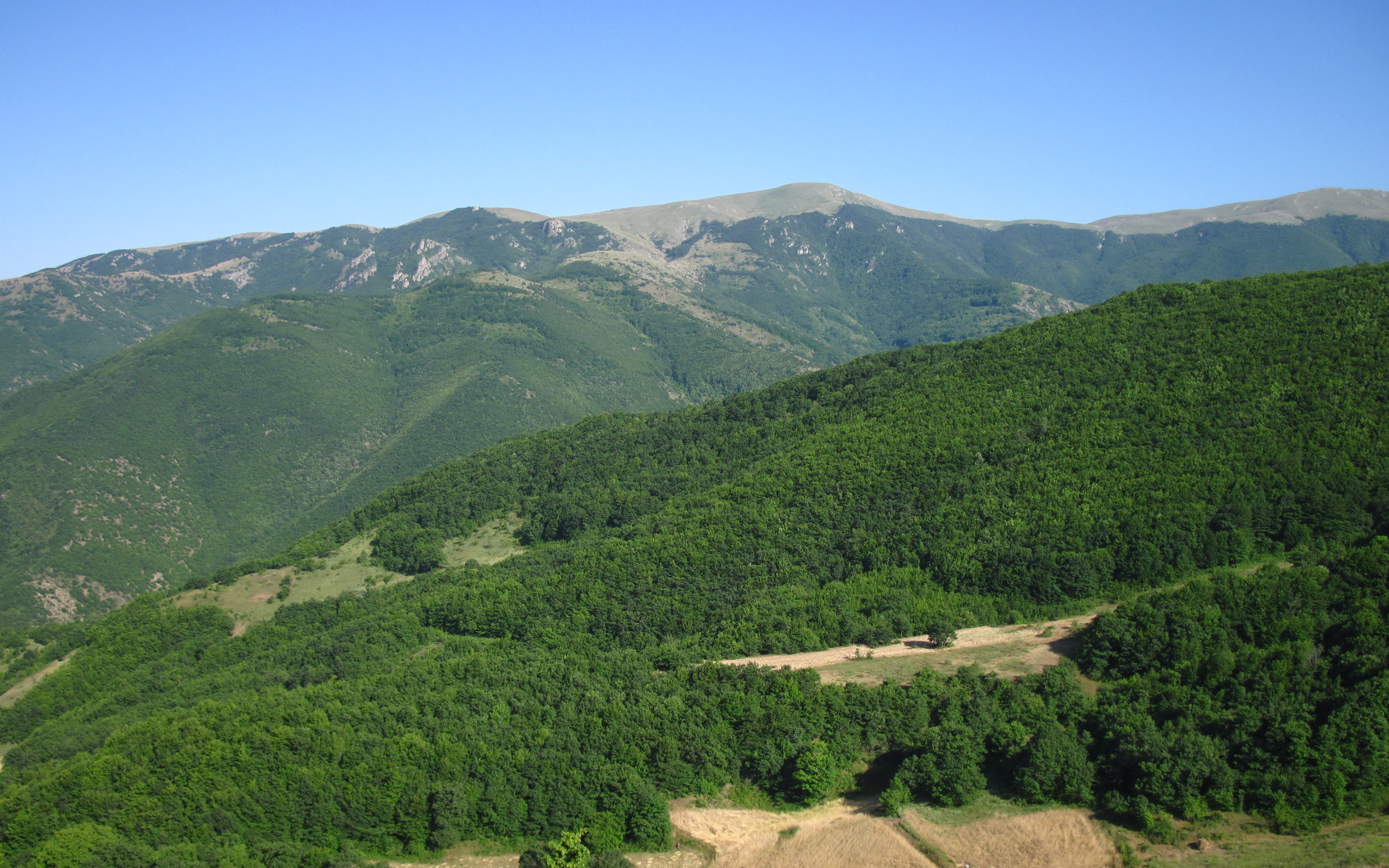
Chaparli summer camp

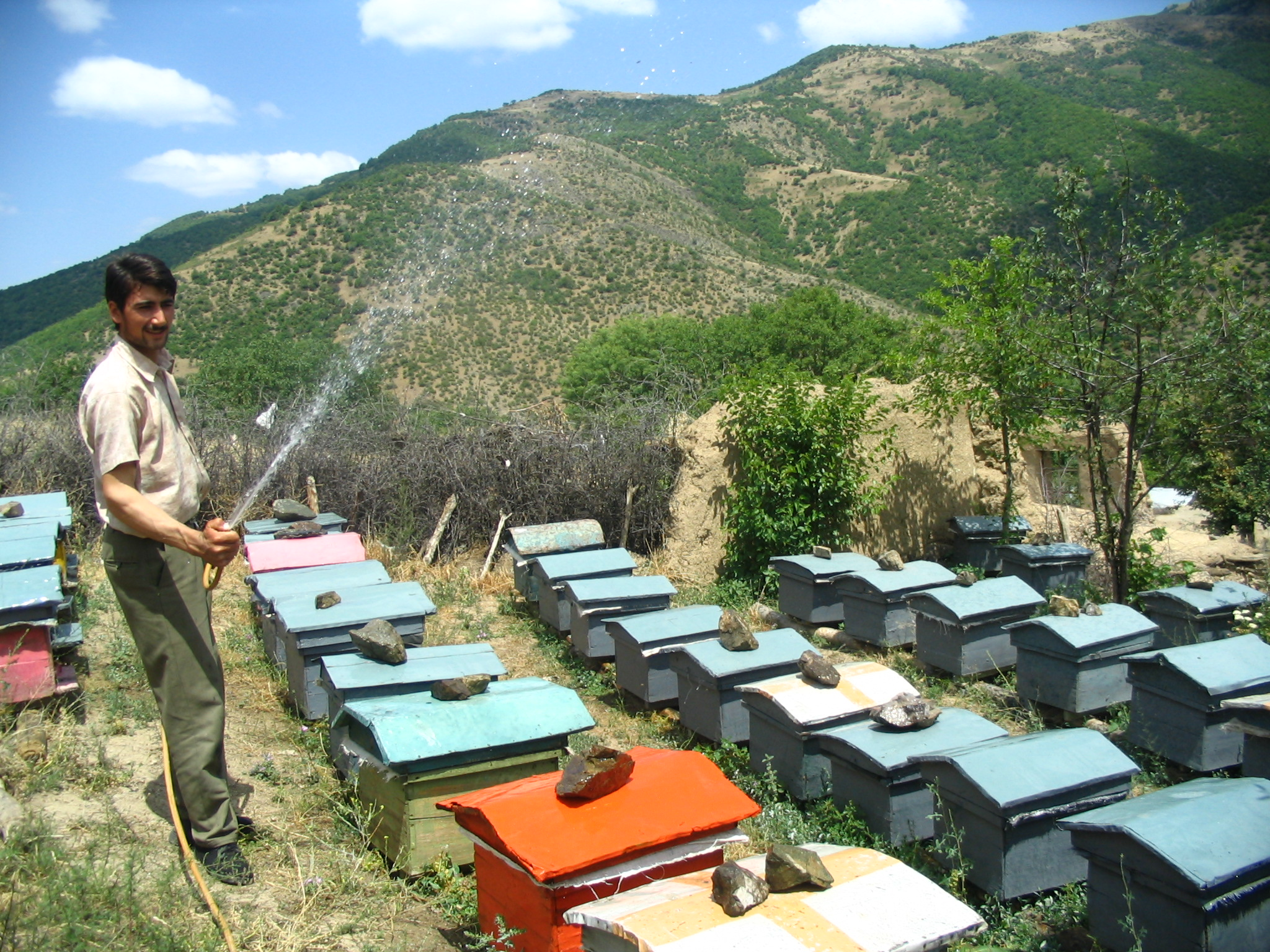
A beekeeper

Arasbaran (Persian: ارسباران, romanized: Arasbârân, lit. 'banks of the Aras'), (Note: or shortened to Arasbar (Persian: ارسبار, romanized: Arasbâr)) also known as Qaradagh (Azerbaijani: Qaradağ; قره‌داغ, lit. 'black mountain'; Armenian: Ղարադաղ), (Note: also spelled Karadagh and alternatively known as Qaraja dagh or Karaja dagh (Azerbaijani: Qaracadağ, قراجه‌‌داغ, lit. 'black-ish mountain')) is a large mountainous area stretching from the Qūshā Dāgh massif, south of Ahar, to the Aras River in East Azerbaijan province of Iran. The region is confined to Aras River in the north, Meshgin Shahr County and Mughan plain in the east, Sarab County in the south, and Tabriz and Marand counties in the west. Since 1976, UNESCO has registered 72,460 hectares of the region, confined to 38°40' to 39°08'N and 46°39' to 47°02'E, as biosphere reserve with the following general description:

This biosphere reserve situated in the north of Iran at the border to Azerbaijan belongs to the Caucasus Iranian Highlands. In-between the Caspian, Caucasus and Mediterranean region, the area covers mountains up to 2,200 metres, high alpine meadows, semi-arid steppes, rangelands and forests, rivers and springs. Arasbaran is the territory of about 23,500 nomads who are mainly living in the buffer and transition zones (2000). Economic activities in the biosphere reserve are mainly agriculture, animal husbandry, horticulture, apiculture, handicrafts and tourism, but business activities can also be found in urbanized areas.

In 2023, Jolfa County in the north was designated UNESCO Aras Geopark.

== History ==
In antiquity, this region was inhabited by the Alarodians and Caspian tribes.

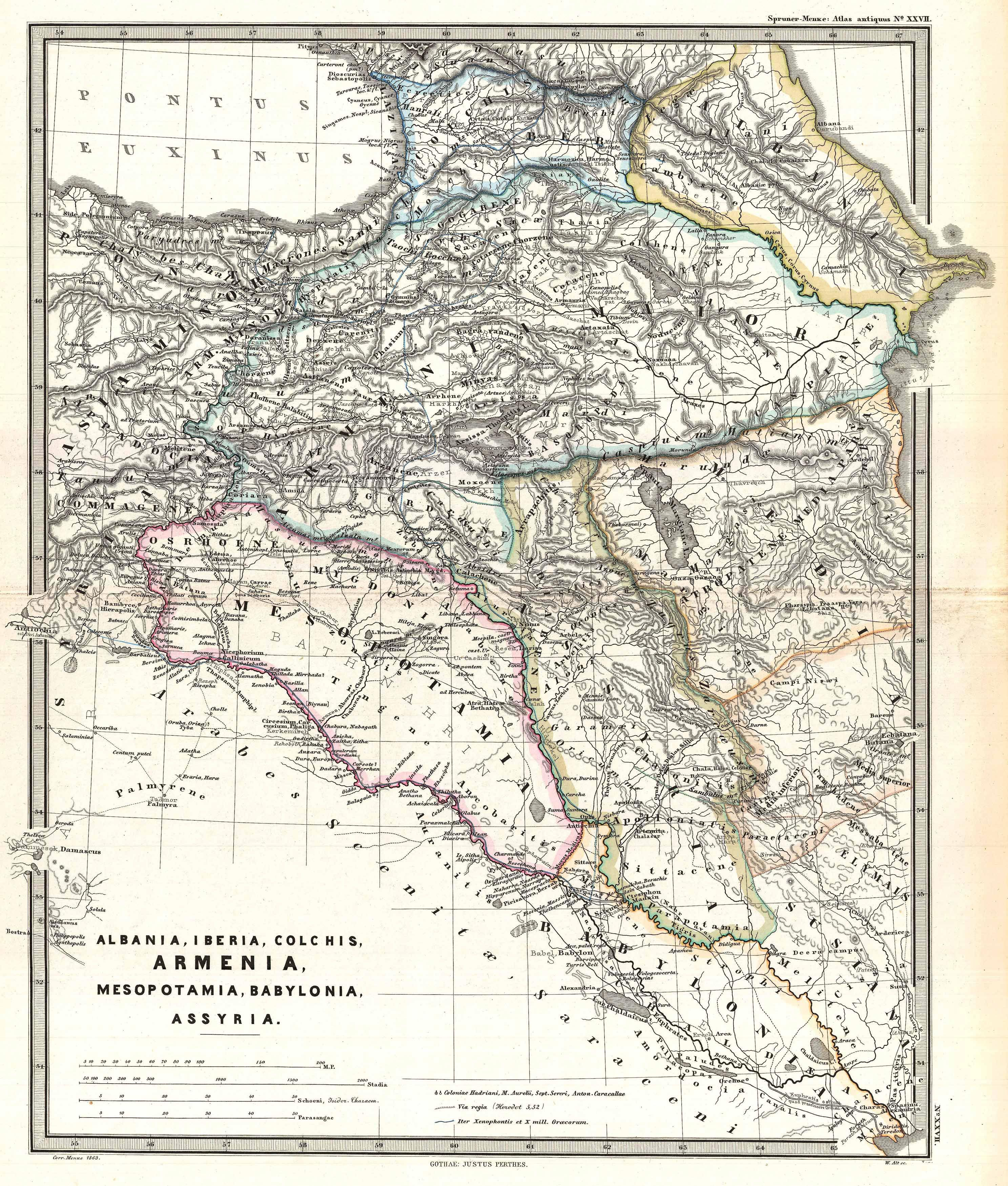
"Armenia, Mesopotamia, Babylonia and Assyria with Adjacent Regions", Karl von Spruner, published in 1865.

Then this area became alternately part of the Medes and Persia. In the 2nd century B.C. the region became part of the Armenian kingdom, where the Armenian principality Parspatunik was established, which existed until the 6th century A.D. Small Armenian melikdoms of Karadagh (Arasbaran) remained until the Turkish invasion of 1918. The Armenian population is preserved in the mountains of Arasbaran (Karadagh) in modern day.

There is no mention of Arasbaran as a geo-political entity in written sources dating prior to Safavid era. There is a speculation that the region referred to as Syah Kuh by the 10th-century Muslim geographer, Ibn Hawqal, corresponds to the present day Arasbaran. However, the said Syahkoh has more similarities with Manghishlaq in the eastern shores of Caspian Sea. Therefore, Arasbaran's history should be considered in the context of its two main towns, Ahar and Kaleybar.

Kaleybar, formerly known as bedh, was the stronghold of Babak Khorramdin who, in 816 AD, revolted against Islamic Caliphate and was defeated in 836 AD. The events of the two decades long tumultuous times have been extensively reported by Islamic historians of the epoch. The first report is by Al-Masudi in The Meadows of Gold: Babak revolted in Bedh region with the disciples of Djavidan ... Following a series of defeats Babak was blockaded in his native town..., which even now is known as Babak's country. Ibn Athir in his book, The Complete History, has devoted many pages to the description of battles.

Yaqut al-Hamawi, writing in early thirteenth century, describes Kaleybar in the following words, County between Azerbaijan and Erran.... This county produces pomegranates of incomparable beauty, excellent figs and grapes that are dried on fires (because the sun is always obscured by thick clouds). In the 12th-13th centuries, Ahar was a minor and short-lived, but prosperous emirate ruled by the Pishteginid dynasty of Georgian origin (1155–1231). Yaqut al-Hamawi, describes Ahar as very flourishing despite its small extent.

Both towns lost most of their importance during the rule of Ilkhanate. Hamdallah Mustawfi, writing in the-mid fourteenth century, describes Ahar as "a little town", and Kaleybar as "A village of Azerbaijan, in the woods near a mountain which comprises a fortress".

Ahar was in the focus of Safavid dynasty's agenda for casting of Azerbaijan as a Safavid dominion. Thus, Shah Abbas rebuilt the tomb of Sheikh Shahab ol-Din Ahari. In 1604, as Ottoman forces threatened the area directly to the north of Arasbaran during the Ottoman–Safavid War (1603–1618), Shah Abbas ordered Maqsud Sultan to evacuate the entire population of the Nakhichevan region (including the Armenians of Jolfa, who, in the following year, were transplanted to Isfahan) to Arasbaran and Dezmar.

Arasbaran region suffered enormously during Russo-Persian War (1804–1813) and Russo-Persian War (1826–1828) due to its proximity to the war zone. Western travellers in 1837–1843 period had found Ahar, a city with around 700 households, in wretched condition.

Arasbaran was one of the epicentres of Persian Constitutional Revolution. Arasbaran tribes were heavily involved in armed conflicts; the revolutionary and anti-revolutionary camps were headed, respectively, by Sattar Khan and Rahimkhan Chalabianloo, both from Qaradağ region. When in 1925 Rezā Shāh deposed Ahmad Shah Qajar and founded the Pahlavi dynasty, Arasbaran's gradual decline started. The new king insisted on cultural and ethnic nationalism, and implemented a policy of cultural assimilation. He renamed Qaradağ as Arasbaran to deny the Turkic identity of the inhabitants. Consequently, Arasbaran is no longer in the focus of national politics. Still, many books and articles are being written on the contribution of Arasbaran region, and its inhabitants in the contemporary history of Iran cannot be underestimated. The interested reader may refer to the following scholarly books and articles:

- H. Bybordi "The history of Arasbaran" and the Bybordi migration tribe.
- H. Doosti, "The history and geography of Arasbaran".
- N. Sedqi, "The contemporary political and social history of Arasbaran".
- S.R. Alemohammad, "The book of Arasbaran".
- A concise English language article is "The Tribes of Qarāca Dāġ: A Brief History" by P. Oberling.
- Encyclopediae Iranica has many articles which are related to Arasbaran.

== Arasbaran ecotourism potential ==
The declaration by UNESCO of Arasbaran as a UNESCO Biosphere reserve in 1976 was a great endorsement for the region's ecotourism potential. More recently, visitors from places as far away as Canada have expressed their amazement with approving words. The planned promotion of the Biosphere to the National Park status may farther enhance Arasbaran's environmental significance.

Arasbaran is home to 215 species of birds, notably the Caucasian black grouse, grey partridge, black francolin, and common pheasant, 29 species of reptiles, 48 species of mammals, notably wild goat, wild boar, brown bear, wolf, lynx, and leopard, and 17 species of fish. There is an effort going on to revitalize the locally extinct population of Caspian red deer local to the area. The local flora include hornbeam, sumac, and Berberis. A unique characteristic of Arasbaran forests is the ubiquity of edible wild trees. For instance, a patch of forest between Aghaweye and Oskolou includes hazelnut trees. The large walnut and Cornus mas trees, which grow wild alongside streams, provide an important income source for inhabitants. More exotic plant species, such as redcurrant, truffle and herbs with application in traditional medicine significantly add to the ecological importance of Arasbaran region.

Another potential tourist attraction are the summer camps (ییلاق) of semi-settled Tribes of Arasbaran, known as Ilat, who spend five months of the year in uplands for grazing their livestock. A tourist, while enjoying the fresh thin air of the mountains, may get a chance to observe the age-long traditional living styles of the locals. Some of the attractive sites are Aliabad mountains, meadows above Shojaabad, East Azerbaijan village, and Chaparli and Aqdash summer quarters, all located in a driving distance from Kaleybar.

Numerous hot springs, scattered all over the region, have been considered as attractions for promoting tourism. One example is Motaalleq hot spring therapeutic facility, which is the largest of its kind in Iran. The facility, with an area of 12870 m^{2} includes bathing areas, coffee-shop, restaurants, prayer room, and gymnasium.

In recent years, the local government has organised Zoğal festivals in Kaleybar as a means of promoting tourism. In addition, every year, in the second half of October, a Pomegranate Festival is organised in by the provincial authorities in Mardanaqom village. The main programme of the festival is the performance of ashugh music.

Nearly every village in the region has a landmark in its territories. Some of these are potential tourism attractions. For instance, there is a landmark ancient plane tree in the Kavanaq village, whose photo is presented here. The tree is about 3 metres in diameter and is said to have lived for 500 years. The villagers have developed interesting oral narratives around the events experienced by the tree.

== Demographics ==
In the wake of the Russo-Persian War (1804–1813) a significant fraction of the inhabitants lived as nomadic tribes. The major tribes included; Chalabianlu 1500 tents and houses, Karacurlu 2500, Haji-Alilu 800, Begdillu 200, and various minor groups 500. At the time Ahar, with 3500 inhabitants, was the only city of Qaradağ. By the beginning of the twentieth century the settlement of tribesman were growing and in 1920 there were more than four hundred villages, less than thirty of which were Armenian. However, the nomadic way of living has survived to the present. The nomadic population at present has been estimated to be about 36000, and is not significantly different from the 30000 estimate of 1960.

The defeat of Soviet-created "Azerbaijan People's Government" following World War II and the ensuing events, resulted in mass migration of inhabitants to Tabriz and Tehran. Most of these migrants settled in the shanty towns and worked as painters. The land reforms of 1962–1964 accelerated the migration. The case of a typical village, Abbasabad, is a good example to demonstrate the population depletion; the number of families dropped from 60 families at 1970 to 12 at 2006.

After the election of Ahmadinezhad as president of Iran, a rumour was circulated that UNESCO will compensate the residents to have the village evacuated for wild-life protection efforts. Some early emigrants returned and built decent houses. At the present the region is undergoing a population boom as more wealthy city residents want to spend their retirement in a cleaner environment. Recently, the deputy governor of the East Azarbaijan province has mentioned the phenomenon of reverse migration to Khoda Afarin and Kaleybar counties. The problem is that the population is aging and the working class adults, in the face of scarce job opportunities, live most of the year in large population centres such as Tehran. The issue is so critical that during recent presidential campaign, Mohsen Rezaee referred to Iranian villages as the old age residence.

=== Languages ===
The spoken language of majority of the inhabitant is Azeri, which has a reasonable degree of intelligibility with Turkmeni, Afshar and the Anatolian Turkish. Most inhabitants are bilingual in Persian language, which is the official language of Iran and the sole language of education.

The ancient language of Azerbaijan, namely Tati survives in the Karingani dialect of the language. In addition to the large village of Karingan, the neighboring villages of Chay Kandi, Kalasor, Khoynarood, and Arazin are likewise the remaining Tati-speaking Old Azari/Tati-speaking native, a language which was the Iranian language of Azerbaijan before the arrival of Turkic speakers in large numbers during the long wars between Safavid Persia/Iran and the Ottoman Empire in the 16the and 17th centuries, where a large population transfer took place between the two.

This language, has a rare and unusual point of grammar called the hearsay tense. Consequently, in Azerbaijani speaking society the boundary between the private and shared memories becomes fuzzy, and the magnitude of time lapse between the events shrinks. This is an ideal feature for the generation of oral cultural artifacts, particularly mythology, epics and folkloric music.

A rare opportunity for recording and preserving Qaradağ's culture was provided by the innovative method by which Shahriar in his famous verse book, Heydar Babaya Salam adopted to summarize the Cultural identity in concise poetic form. A generation of lesser known poets from Arasbaran used similar approach for perpetuating region's oral traditions. Remarkable examples are mourning Sabalan by Abbas Barez, and "Hail to Qizil Qala'h" by Seifollah Delkhon. Another example is Mohamad Golmohamadi's long poem, titled I am madly in love with Qareh Dagh (قاراداغ اؤلکه‌سینین گؤر نئجه دیوانه‌سی ام), which is a concise description of the region's cultural landscape.

== Culture ==
=== Mythology ===
The inhabitants of every village attribute spiritual importance to at multiple sites, scattered throughout the village territory. These places, generally known as Ojaq, are located in areas with rapid variation on the land topography, and are in some way linked to Jinns via established narratives. Most of these sites possess any significantly conspicuous landmark. At some sites, which are considered sacred by many villages, people will occasionally gather to slaughter sacrificial animals or offer a simple meal of freshly baked bread and cheese with tea. At some sites, they have collected medium-sized rocks around some trees and hang coloured threads or ribbons from the trees.

In most villages, there are sites with narrative associations, which are not considered sacred. These sites are in secluded locations formed by natural topography of the landscape. Often the narratives involve bears as the principal subject. The main theme of the narratives is the following. A male bear kidnaps a blackberry picking pretty girl and takes her to his den. A hybrid child is born, but the girl runs away at the first opportunity leaving the lamenting bear entreatingly crying for his lost wife.

According to a myth the wolf is found as a symbol of merciless power that is able to destroy everything. If a human being touches it, whatever frightens him/her will be frustrated.

==== Vergi ====
Vergi, meaning gift, is a perceived ability for performing extraordinary feats such as prophesy or healing, which supposedly can only be received from god or from Shia' Imams. It is believed that a Vergi is inherited and not to be learned. For instance, there is a family in Vayqan among whom the Vergi for catching snakes is transmitted from generation to generation. Sometimes, the Vergi is claimed to be received in dreams. But often, it is received in Ojaqs where ghosts show themselves to and talk to gifted. It is believed that there is no escape from Vergi and that, at first, it generates suffering comparable to shamanistic illness.

==== Toğs ====
Ashura, the 10th day of the lunar month Muharram, is the day at which the mourning celebrations commemorating Imam Husayns' martyrdom reach their climax. In many villages of Qaradağ, palm sized metallic icons fixed on a medium-sized wooden handles, locally known as Toğs, are harbingers of the exact hour when Husayn was killed; allegedly, they relapse to utter in-animation following ten days of relentless erratic movements at the hands of their carriers (alamdars). The tuğs – believed to be sisters – are housed in the mosques and are greatly revered by the inhabitants of all neighbouring villages. Unfortunately, there are no systematic studies or first hand reports on these fascinating relics. Still, every year, as a ritualistic obligation, expatriates flock to the said villages to receive the blessings of the sacred day in the company of their sacred Toğs. In the accompanying photo two persons holding toğ can be seen, who are surrounded by mourners beating on their legs. One toğ is kept standing still in the centre. It seems that the other toğ is performing erratic motions and is pulling the holder.

=== Arasbaran dogs ===
Orhan Pamuk in 2001 Turkish novel, My Name Is Red, gives a vivid description of Turkic people's love-hate attitude towards dogs. Every summer, the real life version of this description is in display in Chaparli. Each family has 2-5 dogs, all with characteristic cropped ears and tails. The dogs are fed generous portions of milk soaked bread. When the sheep herds are brought back for milking near tents, dogs sleep around the camp most of the day. The inhabitants treat the beasts with utter respect, a manner which is loathed by more pious villagers of the region as a pagan act. Between dusk and dawn dogs regain their vicious character; strangers have to avoid crossing a campsite otherwise the attacking dogs cannot be controlled even by their owners. Fending off the dogs by beating is considered an act of aggression towards the owner and should be avoided. In fact most of the feuds between settled villagers and pastoralists are about dogs.

=== Arasbaran carpet ===
Carpet weaving stands out as the acme of Azeri art and people of Arasbaran have significantly contributed to this artistic tradition. Arabaran carpet was a hybrid between Persian carpet and Azerbaijani rug. There were indigenous styles as well. For instance, carpets known as Balan rugs had a size of approximately 1x4 m^{2} and a characteristic pattern.

The acme of carpet weaving art in Arasbaran is manifested in verni, which was originated in Nagorno-Karabakh. Verni is a carpet-like kilim with a delicate and fine warp and weft, which is woven without a previous sketch, thanks to the creative talents of nomadic women and girls. Verni weavers employ the image of birds and animals (deer, rooster, cat, snake, birds, gazelle, sheep, camel, wolf and eagle) in simple geometrical shapes, imitating the earthenware patterns that were popular in prehistoric times. A key décor feature, which is intrinsic to many vernis, is the S-element. Its shape varies; it may resemble both the figure 5 and letter S. This element means "dragon" among the nomads. At present, verni is woven by the girls of Arasbaran Tribes, often in the same room where the nomadic tribes reside, and is a significant income source for about 20000 families.

=== Ashughi music and Qaradağ's contribution ===
Bəlkə bu yerlərə birdə gəlmədim (I may not come to these mountains again)
duman səlamət qal dağ səlamət qal (Farewell to the Mist and to the mountain)
arxamca su səpir göydə bulutlar (Clouds sprinkle drops of rain)
leysan səlamət qal yağ səlamət qal (Farewell to summer days, farewell to the rain)

These opening verses of a contemporary ashug song, composed by Məhəmməd Araz, may well represent the essence of Qaradağ's cultural identity; frequent allusions to a mountain with the intention of arousing an emotional state with a tone of mild melancholy- a state well expressed by the ashughi music.

A century long autocratic nation building policies of Pahlavi era in Iran has succeeded in cultural assimilation in the favor of a government sanctioned culture. The mountainous region of Qaradağ, however, relatively escaped the demise due to its remoteness and inaccessibility. Many elements of the indigenous culture, particularly local music, have survived to the present day. More recently a slow but persistent cultural revival has been in progress and the inhabitants along with their city dwelling relatives perceive an awareness of their common cultural roots with the inhabitants of eastern Turkey and Azerbaijan republics, where a cultural renaissance is well underway since the collapse of the Soviet Union. The ashughi music is cornerstone of this shared identity.

The number of ashughs has significantly increased after Aşiq Imran Heydəri (عاشیق ایمران حیدری) started accepting pupils to his academic style classes in Tabriz. Imran's efforts effectively shifted the general impression of the ashugh music from association to the nomadic life in mountains to a music suited for performances in urban settings. At present, the de facto representative of ashughs is Aşiq Rəsol Qorbani from Abbasabad village.

== Economy ==
Up until the Islamic revolution the region had a subsistence economy – all food was produced within the villages and the surplus was bartered with items supplied by travelling salesman. Most women spent winter months weaving carpets using raw material which were locally produced. Rainfed agriculture on the steep slopes had severely eroded the farms and productivity had dropped to an unsustainable low level, and the inhabitants had to supplement their income by taking seasonal construction jobs in Tehran. After the revolution, thanks to the construction of roads giving accessibility to larger town markets, livestock production became the dominant mode of the region's economy. However, the quarrels over grazing rights didn't allow large-scale animal agriculture.

In recent years beekeeping has emerged as the only occupation that can provide a family with sufficient income. The honey produced in villages close to pastures is renowned for its quality and has an established niche market. Mardanaqom village is one of the main producers of honey.

== Major historical sites ==
- Babak Fort, which is located on a mountain summit near Kaleybar, is a large citadel and National Symbol of Iranians and Iranian Azerbaijanis.
- Jowshīn Fort ( قلعه جوشین ) is located in Varzaqan County. The fort was probably built in the fifth century.
- Ahar Bazar (بازار اهر) is one of the Iranian national monuments. It is adorned in a spectacular fashion, with specific plaster moldings and unique oriental design. The bazaar is composed of various sections and has been repaired during the Qajar period.
- The tomb of Sheikh Shahab ol-Din Ahari. The monument was described by James Morier in the early nineteenth century, "The mausoleum is of brick, with a foundation of stone, and faced by an elevated portico, flanked by two minors or pillars encrusted with green tiles. A little wooden door was opened for us in the back of the building, which introduced us into the spot that contained the tomb of the Sheikh, which was enclosed by a stone railing, carved into open work, and surrounded by a sculptured arabesque ornament, of very good taste. The tomb is distinguished by a marble cover, on which is an Arabic inscription in relieve."
- Khoda Afarin bridges. Two bridges on Aras river are located near Khomarlu. One bridge is badly damaged and the other is still usable for pedestrians. The latter bridge is 160 m in length.
- Amir Arshad's residence (خانه امیر ارشد) in the Okhara village of Varzaqan County is still standing and has been registered as a historical site.
- Qantoor building in Aynaloo is a mansion which was built in 1907 by a wealthy Armenian businessman. This landmark building is important in the context of highlighting the religious and technical tolerance that was a unique characteristic of the Arasbaran region.
- Kordasht Hammam (حمام کردشت) is a royal bath which was built in the sixteenth century by king Abbas I of Persia.

== Notable people ==
- Sattar Khan was originally from Qaradağ. He is considered as a national hero of Iran and is referred to as سردار ملی (meaning National Commander). He headed Constitutionalist rebels from the Amirkhiz district of Tabriz in early twentieth century.
- Babak Khorramdin, who until recently was fairly unknown to locals, is becoming a national hero particularly among new generation of Iranians as a symbol of resistance against Arab invasion twelve centuries ago. During the relative liberalism of Khatami era (1997–2005) every year in the last week of June Azerbaijani nationalists celebrated his birthday symbolically at the Babak Castle. Babak's legacy has been a controversial subject in academic and intellectual circles of Iran.
- Amir Arshad, the headman of Haji-Alilu tribe, was a legendary military commander in early twentieth century. He is credited with fending off the communism from Iran.
- Karim Pasha Bahadori, a prominent landlord, was the secretary of former queen, Farah Pahlavi.
- Qasem Ahari was born in Ahar in 1884. He was the first European trained ophthalmologist of Iran. Qasem Ahari served four terms in National Consultative Assembly. He was the first representative of Azerbaijan in Senate of Iran.
- Asadollah Mohammadkhanlu, the headman of Mohammad Khanlu tribe, was a feudal and influential politician during Pahlavi era. He was among the first group of people whose properties were confiscated just after the Islamic Revolution.
- Three generation of Mirahmadi family from Hasanbeyglu tribe have been significant political players in local and national levels since Constitutional Revolution of early twentieth century.
- Andre Agassi, the retired professional tennis player and former World No. 1, is the son of man originally from Arasbaran.
- Aşıq Hoseyn Javan, born in Oti Kandi, is the legendary ashik who was exiled to Soviet Union due to his revolutionary songs during the brief reign of Azerbaijan People's Government following the World War II. Hoseyn Javan's music, in contrast to the contemporary poetry in Iran, emphasizes on realism and highlights the beauties of real life. One of Hoseyn's songs, with the title "Kimin olacaqsan yari, bəxtəvər?", is among the most famous ashugh songs.
- Rasool Qorbani (رسول قربانی), recognised as the godfather among the masters of ashugh music, was born in 1933 in AbbasAbad. Rasool started his music career in 1952 and by 1965 was an accomplished ashik. Rasool had performed in international music festivals held in France, Germany, the Netherlands, England, Japan, China, Czech Republic, Slovakia, Austria, Australia, Azerbaijan, Serbia, Turkey and Hungary. Rasool has been awarded highest art awards of the country, and will be honored by government during the celebration for his 80th birthday. changiz mehdipour (چنگیز مهدی‌پور), born in Sheykh Hoseynlu, has significantly contributed to the revival and development of ashugh music. His book on the subject attempts to adapt the ashugh music to the artistic taste of the contemporary audience.
- Khanali Siami (1953–2013) was a famous photographer. His published photo-album is the first comprehensive visual presentation of East Azarbaijan Province. Since 1910, Ravanbakhsh Leysi, a high school teacher from Kaleybar has followed the footsteps of Siami in Nature photography. Most photos in this article were taken by him.
- Abbas Eslami (عباس بارز), known with his pen-name Barez, (1932–2011) was a great poet. He described the melancholic demise of Qaradağ in a book titled mourning Sabalan ( ياسلي ساوالان).
- Bahman Zamani, a rebel-poet, influenced the revolutionary generation of 1960–1980 by highlighting the pitiful state of Qaradağ due to the centralist policies of Pahlavi era. His most famous poem in this regard is Qaradağ(قره‌داغ). Bahman is also famous for composing the song "Araz Araz Khan Araz" in the memory of Samad Behrangi.
- Sattar Golmohamadi and his nephew Mohamad Golmohamadi are contemporary poets, both dedicated their poems to the cultural identity of Qaradağ region. Mohamad Golmohamadi's poem, titled (قاراداغ اؤلکه‌سینین گؤر نئجه دیوانه‌سی ام), is a concise description of the region's cultural landscape.
- Ayatollah Hojat (آیت الله العظمی سید محمد حجت کوه‌کمری) was one of the highest ranking clerics of the twentieth century. He was the supreme legal authority or the source of emulation for millions of Shia' Muslims before the Iranian revolution.
- Prof. Mahmoud Akhondi (محمود آخوندى) was born ii 1933. He is an eminent Swiss-trained law professor. His 10 volume book on criminal prosecution is a major textbook in Iranian law schools.

== See also ==
- Ashik
- Babak Fort
- Karadagh khanate
- Karadagh rug
- List of biosphere reserves in Iran
