= Karadagh rug =

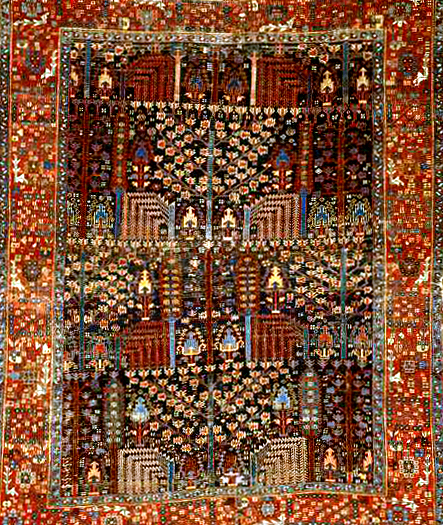
Karadagh rug

Karadagh rug or Karaja rug handmade in or near the village of Qarājeh (Karaja), in the Qareh Dāgh (Karadagh) region of Iran just south of the Azerbaijan border, northeast of Tabrīz.

== See also ==
- Heriz rug
- Tabriz rug
