= Motaalleq =

Motaalleq متعلق
- Village
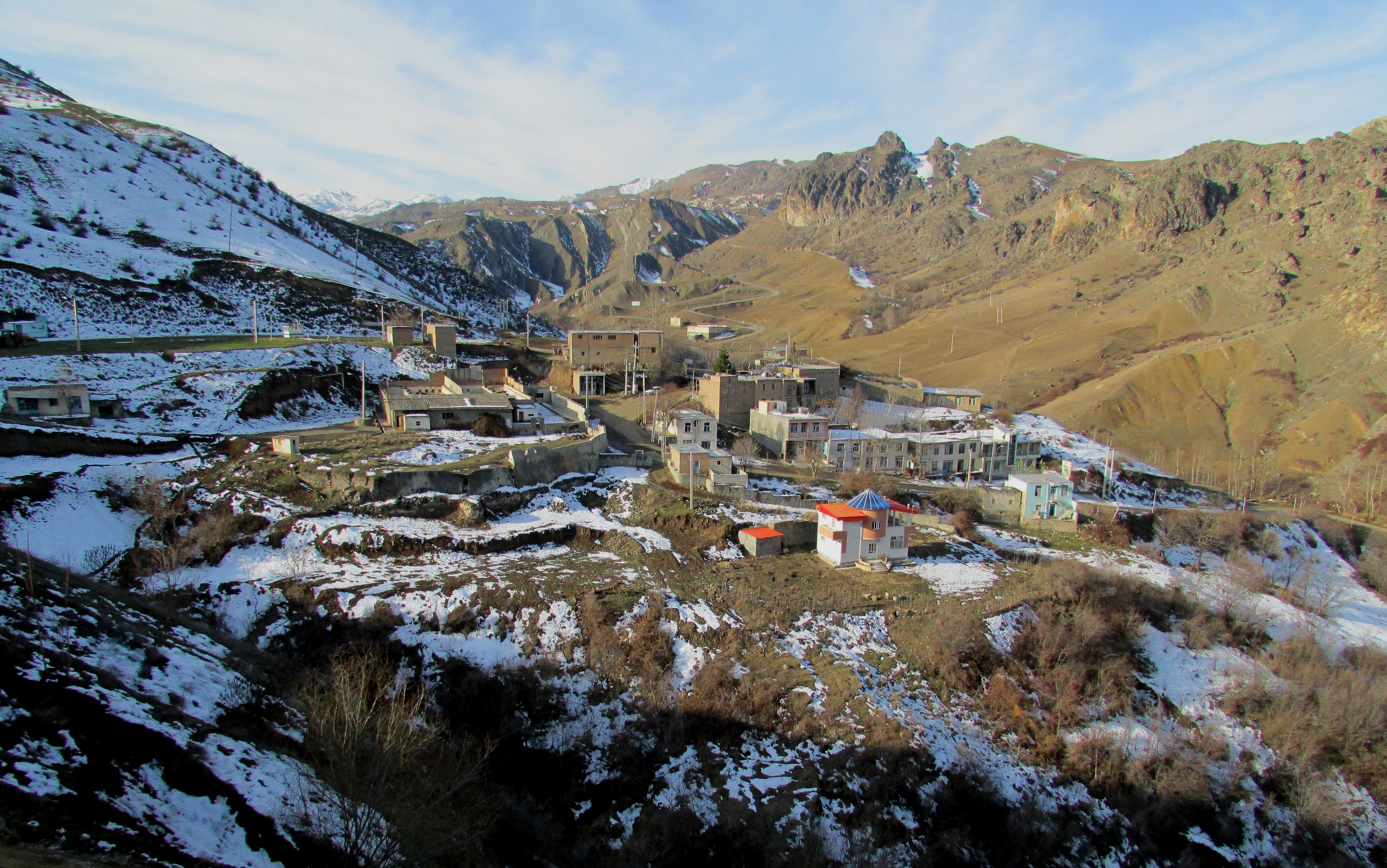
- Village view in January 2014

- Location within Iran
- Coordinates: 39°01′54″N 47°16′45″E
- Country: Iran
- Province: East Azerbaijan
- County: Kaleybar
- Bakhsh: Abish Ahmad
- Rural District: Abish Ahmad

Population (2006)
  - Total: 175
- Time zone: UTC+3:30 (IRST)
  - Summer (DST): UTC+4:30 (IRDT)

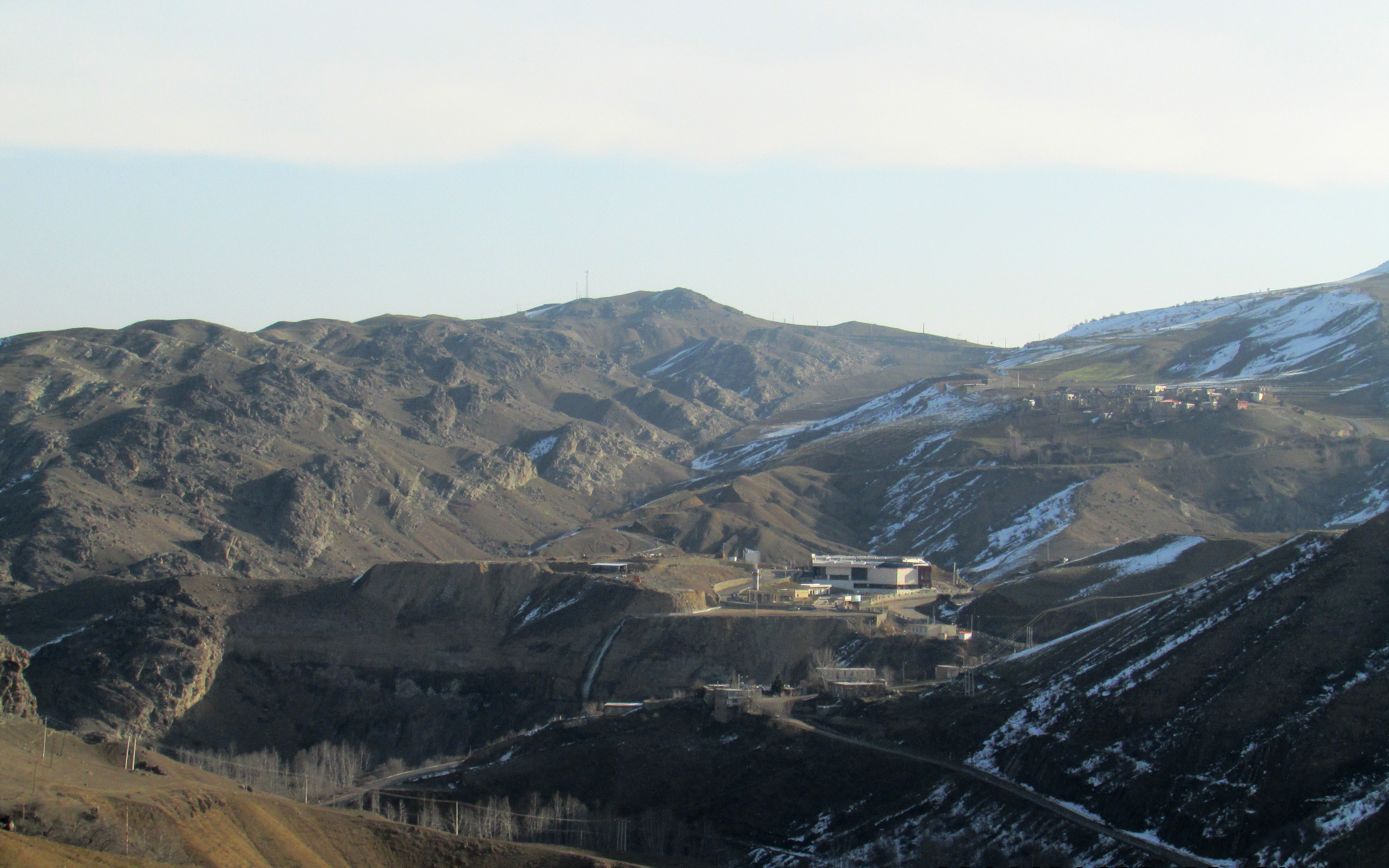
Hot spring therapeutic facility near Motaalleq

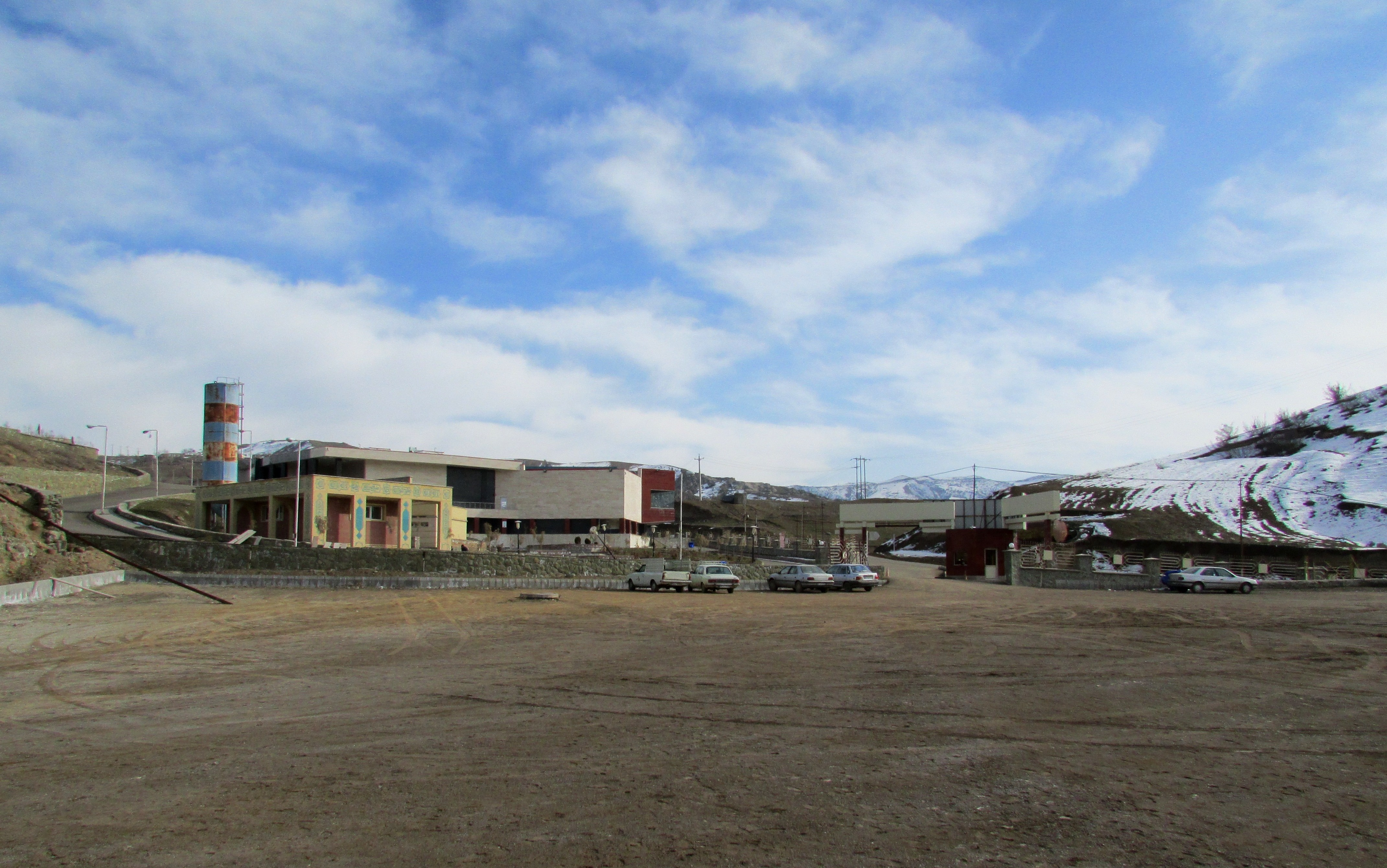
A closeup view of the Hot spring therapeutic facility near Motaalleq

Motaalleq Persian: متعلق, also Romanized as Mota‘alleq is a village in Abish Ahmad Rural District, Abish Ahmad District, Kaleybar County, East Azerbaijan Province, Iran. At the 2006 census, its population was 175, in 57 families.

== Situation ==
The online edition of the Dehkhoda Dictionary, quoting Iranian Army files, reports a population of 143 people in late 1940s. At the 2006 census, its population was 175, in 57 families. According to a more recent and, perhaps, reliable statistics the population is 115 people in 40 families.

== Motaalleq Hot spring therapeutic facility ==
Yaqut al-Hamawi, writing in early thirteenth century, refers to a large river near Kaleybar, which has the property of curing the most inveterate fevers. One may infer that this statement is, indeed, a reference to multiple Hot springs in Motaalleq.

Motaalleq Hot spring therapeutic facility is the largest of its kind in Iran. The facility, with an area of 12870 m^{2} includes bathing areas, coffee-shop, restaurants, prayer room, and gymnasium.

Since its inception, the facility has been a bone of contention between authorities and villagers, who claim the ownership of the hot spring.
