= Tomb of Sheikh Shahab ol-Din Ahari =

Historic building in Ahar, Iran

Mausoleum of Sheikh Shahabeddin Ahari آرامگاه شیخ شهاب‌الدین اهری
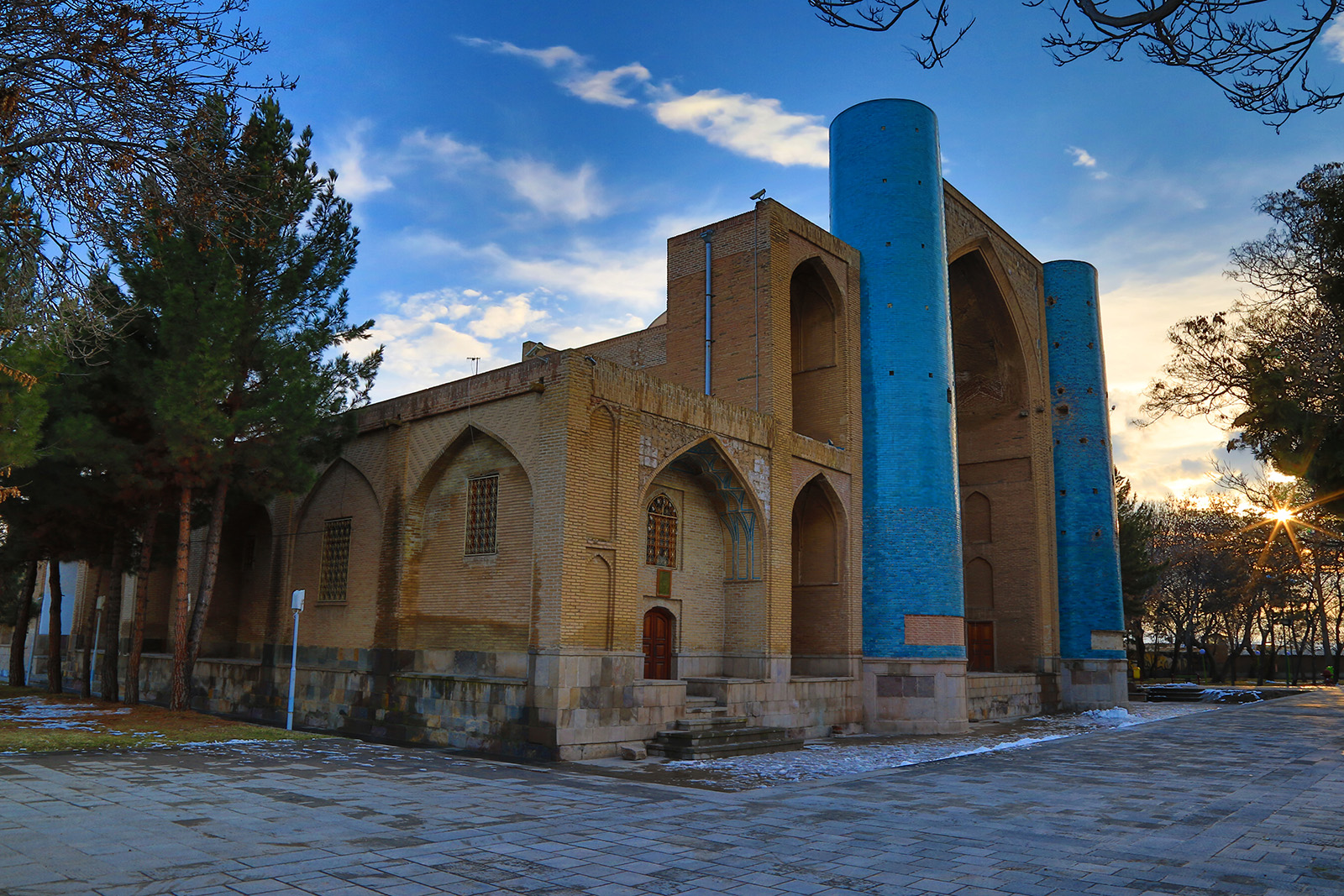

- Location within Iran
- 38°28′07″N 47°03′52″E
- Location: Ahar, East Azerbaijan province, Iran

Iran National Heritage List
- Official name: Mausoleum of Sheikh Shahabeddin Ahari
- Type: Mausoleum
- Designated: 1932
- Reference no.: 179
- Conservation organization: Cultural Heritage, Handicrafts and Tourism Organization of Iran

The Tomb of Sheikh Shahab ol-Din Ahari (Persian: آرامگاه شیخ شهاب‌الدین اهری) is a Safavid era building in Ahar, Iran.
