= Emarat, East Azerbaijan =

Emarat عمارت
- Village
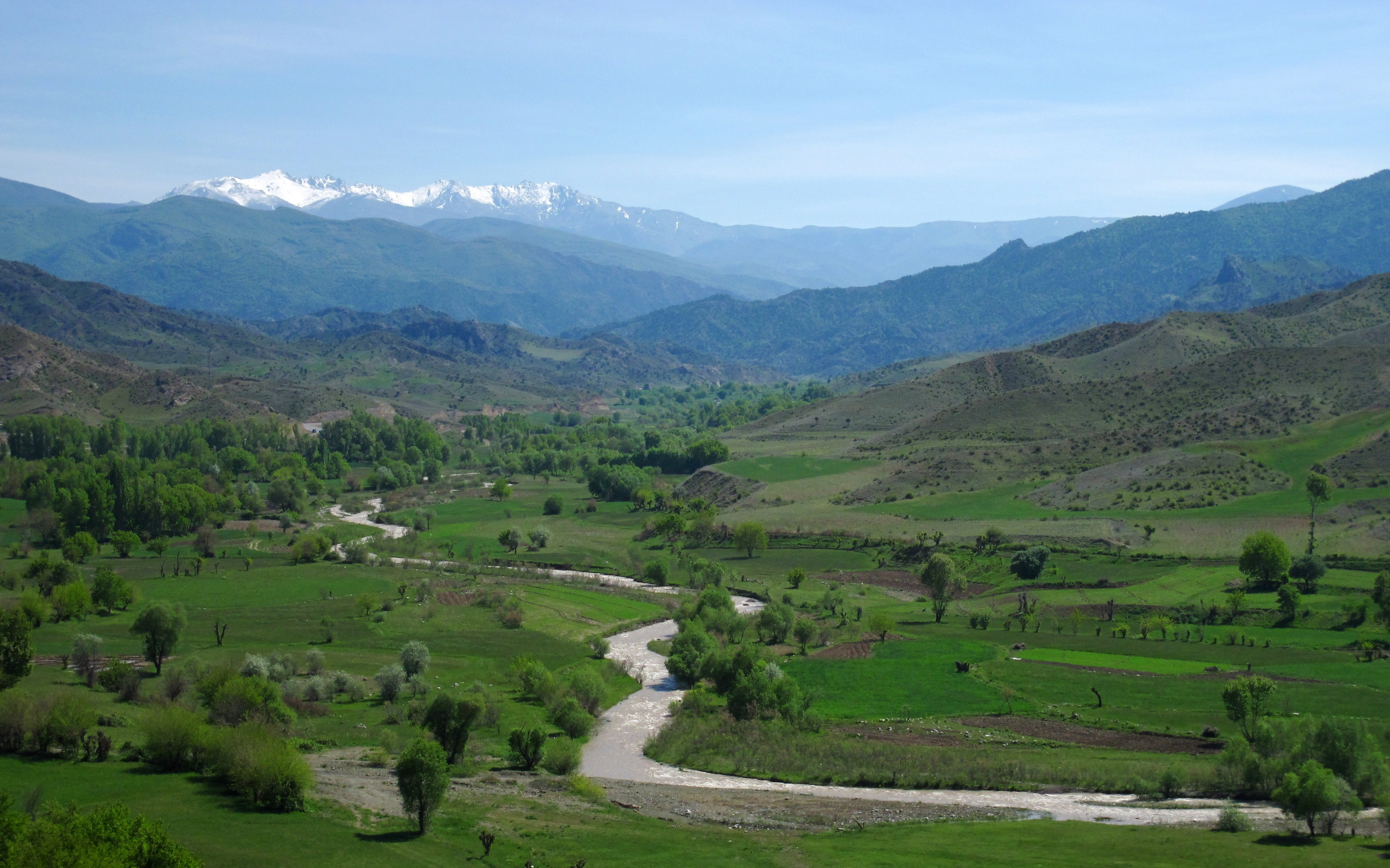
- Village view in June 2013

- Location within Iran
- Coordinates: 39°02′37″N 46°57′19″E
- Country: Iran
- Province: East Azerbaijan
- County: Khoda Afarin
- Bakhsh: Minjavan
- Rural District: Minjavan-e Sharqi

Population (2006)
  - Total: 151
- Time zone: UTC+3:30 (IRST)
  - Summer (DST): UTC+4:30 (IRDT)

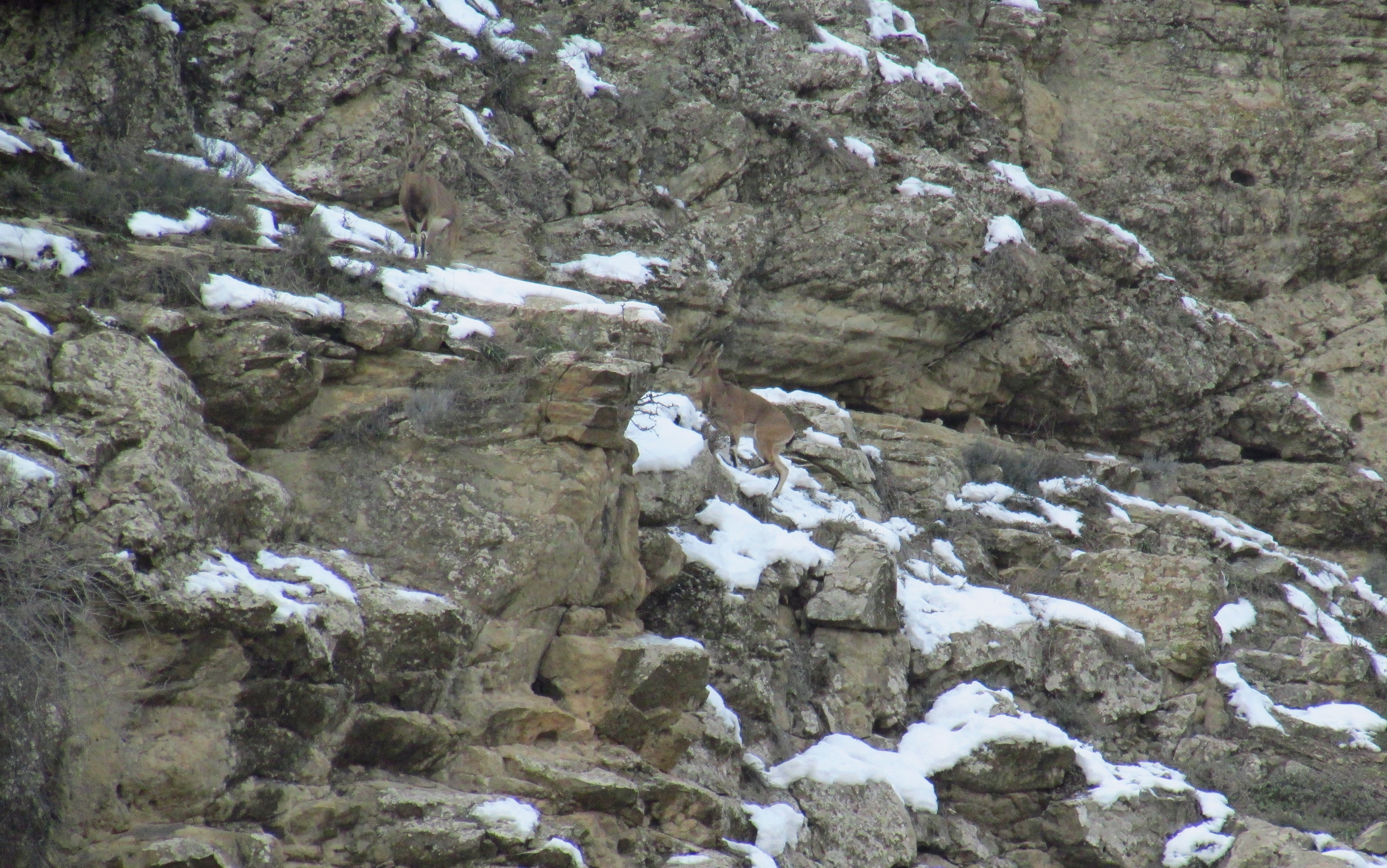
Two well camouflaged mountain goats near Emarat, East Azerbaijan village.

Emarat (Persian: عمارت, also Romanized as ‘Emārat) is a village in Minjavan-e Sharqi Rural District, Minjavan District, Khoda Afarin County, East Azerbaijan Province, Iran. At the 2006 census, its population was 151, in 37 families.
