= Vayqan-e Maqadas =

Vayqan-e Maqadas وايقان مقدس
- Village
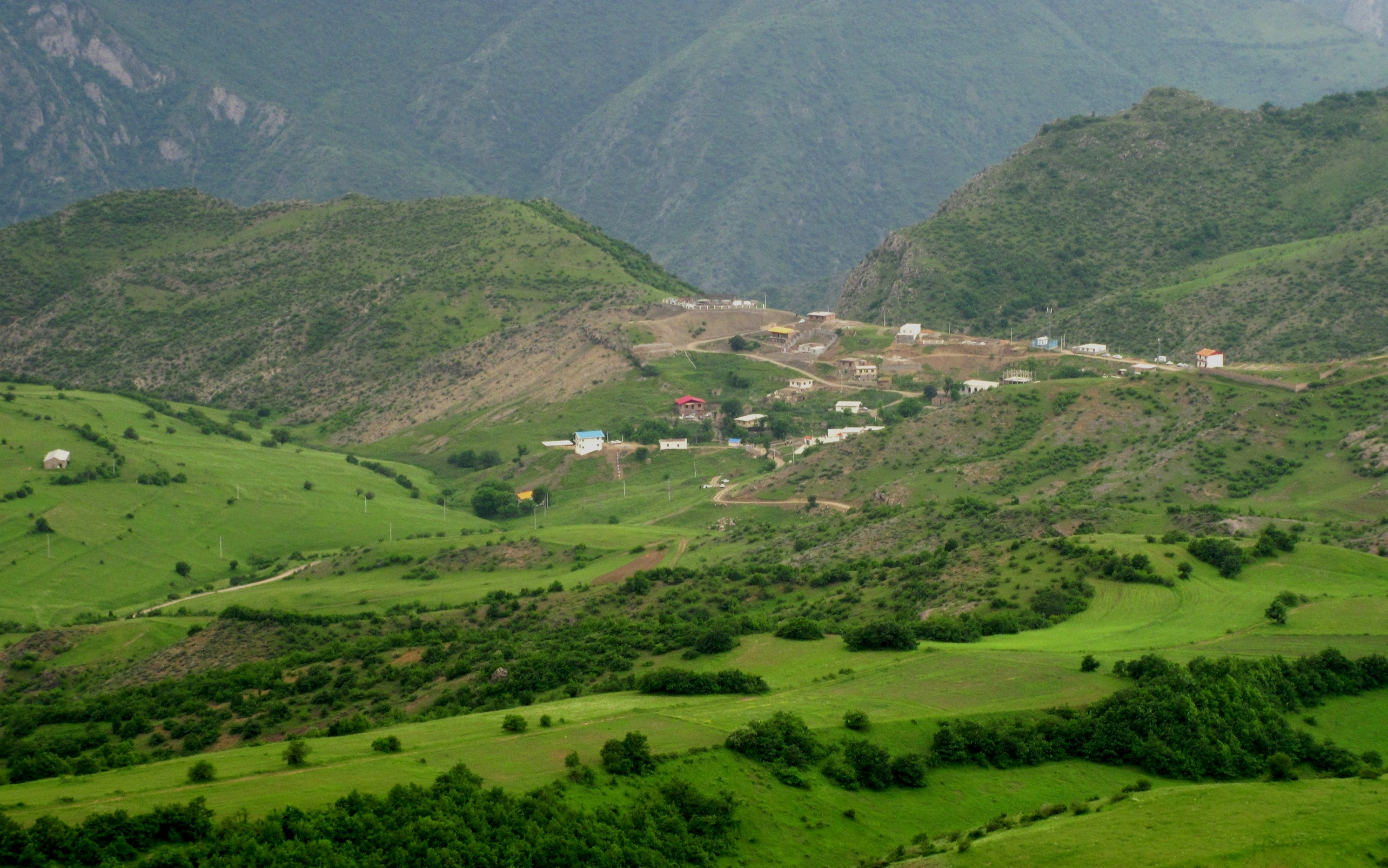
- Village view in June 2011

- Location within Iran
- Coordinates: 38°54′39″N 46°46′00″E
- Country: Iran
- Province: East Azerbaijan
- County: Khoda Afarin
- Bakhsh: Minjavan
- Rural District: Minjavan-e Gharbi

Population (2006)
  - Total: 46
- Time zone: UTC+3:30 (IRST)
  - Summer (DST): UTC+4:30 (IRDT)

Vayqan-e Maqadas (Persian: وايقان مقدس, also Romanized as Vāyqān-e Maqadas; also known as Vayān, Vayghan, Vāyqān, Vāyqān-e Ā’īnehlū, and Voyān; in Armenian: Ողան) is a village in Minjavan-e Gharbi Rural District, Minjavan District, Khoda Afarin County, East Azerbaijan Province, Iran. At the 2006 census, its population was 46, in 13 families.

== Situation ==
Online edition of the Dehkhoda Dictionary, quoting Iranian Army files, reports a population of 137 people in late 1940s. According to locals, by 1978 a middle school had been built and the village, housing 120 families, was planned to be expanded to receive more families from surrounding villages, which would be evacuated by the environment organization of Iran. During the turbulent year of the Islamic Revolution, many families emigrated to the suburbs of Tehran and joined those who had been settled there in the earlier mass immigration of 1964-1970 following the land reform. Consequently, by the year 2000, the village was on the verge of total desertion.

In a dramatic change of course, the expatriates have started building summer residences in the village since 2007. At the moment the village is experiencing a construction boom. This is evident from a more recent statistics (2011) which reported the population of 88 people in 40 families.

== Characteristic Features of Vayqan ==
Before the Islamic revolution, Vayqan was known as the most religious among the villages of the district. An established family of clerics and a family of pious Sayyids were living in the village; a feature quiet unique for the region and sufficient to provide the village with the epithet Moqadas (meaning holy). In addition, a holy icons, known as toq, was placed in the mosque and allegedly showed miraculous feats during the mourning period of Muharram.

Vayqan is home to a family of snake catchers, whose members have an intrinsic ability to effortlessly catch any poisonous snake.

== Gallery ==
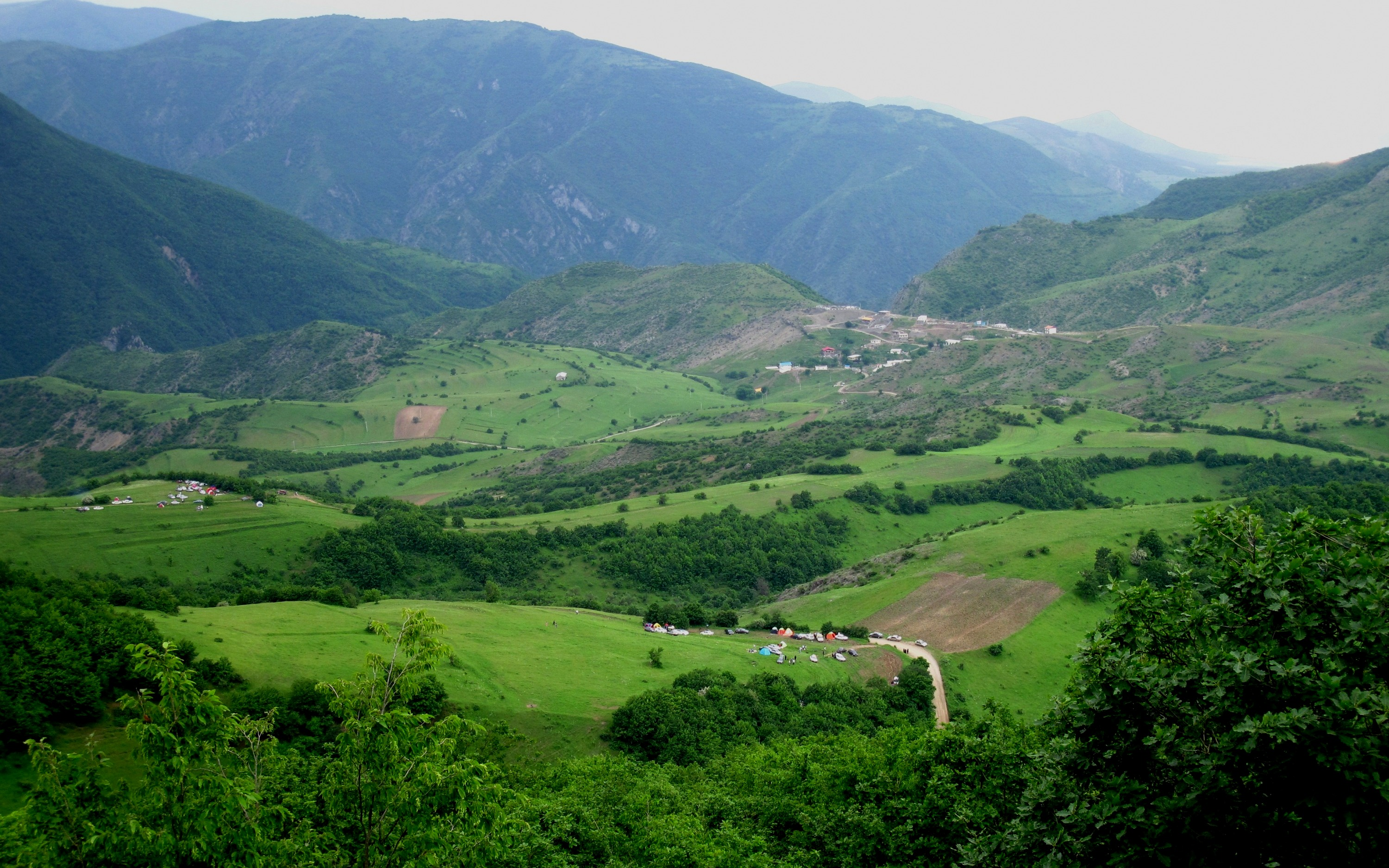
Vayqan; June 2011

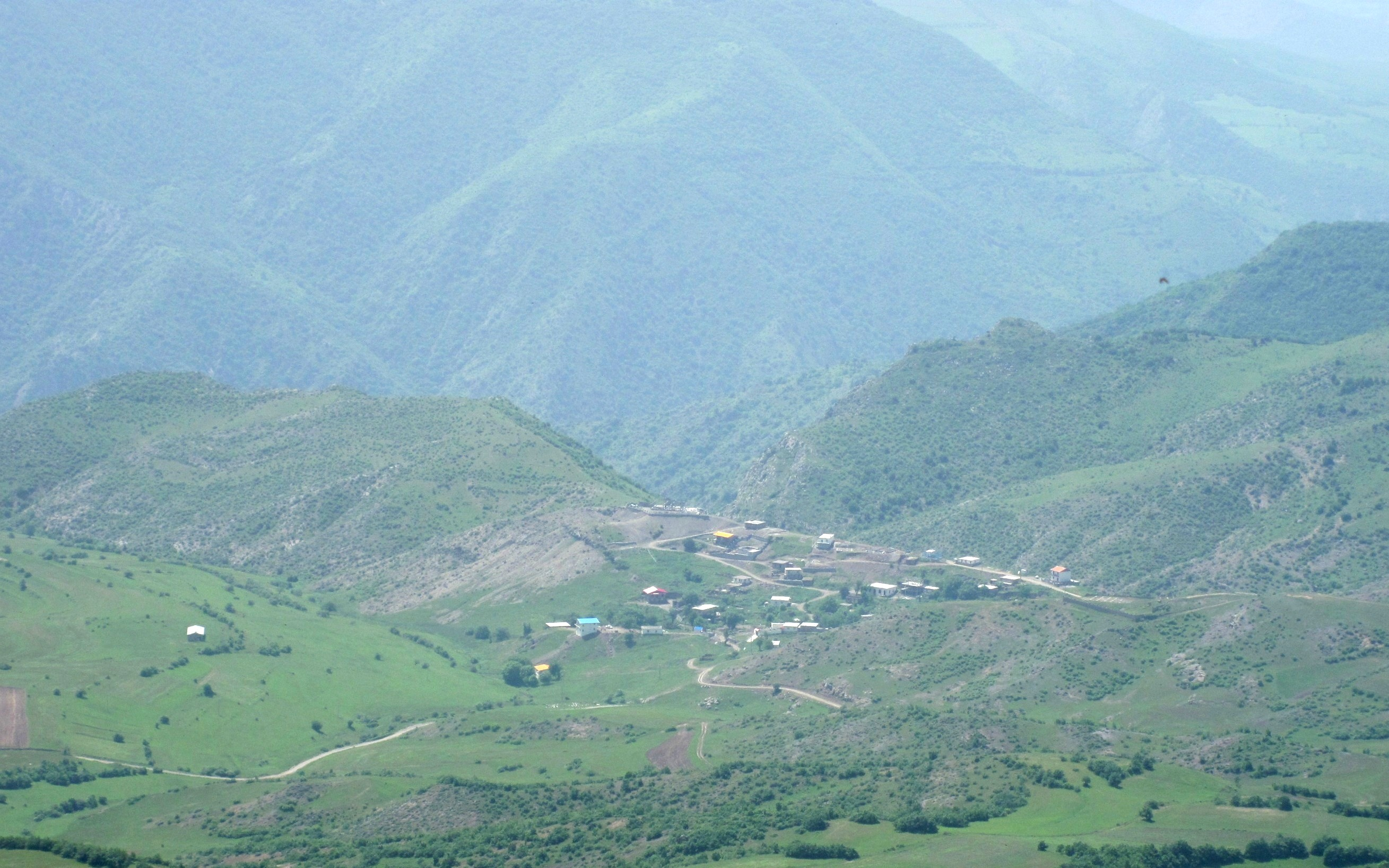
Vayqan; June 2011
