= List of villages in Khoda Afarin =

Khoda Afarin is a county in the east Azerbaijan province in the northeast of Iran. It consist of three major districts: Garamuz, Central district and Minjavan.

== List of villages ==
The following are lists of villages in Khoda Afarin county in east Azerbaijan.

=== Minjavan District ===
==== Dizmar-e Sharqi Rural district ====
- Ahmadabad, Khoda Afarin, village in Dizmar-e Sharqi Rural District, Minjavan District
- Chay Kandi, Khoda Afarin,village in Dizmar-e Sharqi Rural District, Minjavan District
- Khaneqah, Khoda Afarin, a village in Dizmar-e Sharqi Rural District, Minjavan District
- Marzabad, Khoda Afarin, village in Dizmar-e Sharqi Rural District of Minjavan District

==== Minjavan-e Gharbi Rural District ====
- Alherd, Khoda Afarin, village in Minjavan-e Gharbi Rural District, Minjavan District
- Pesyan, Khoda Afarin, village in Minjavan-e Gharbi Rural District, Minjavan District
- Alherd, Khoda Afarin, a village in Minjavan-e Gharbi Rural District, Minjavan District
- Pesyan, Khoda Afarin, village in Minjavan-e Gharbi Rural District, Minjavan District
- Yusoflu, Khoda Afarin, village in Minjavan-e Gharbi Rural District, Minjavan District
- Moradlu, Khoda Afarin, village in Minjavan-e Gharbi Rural District, Minjavan District
- Razin, Khoda Afarin, village in Minjavan-e Gharbi Rural District, Minjavan District

==== Minjavan-e Sharqi Rural district ====
- Jafarabad, Khoda Afarin, village in Minjavan-e Sharqi Rural District, Minjavan District

=== Central district ===
==== Bastamlu Rural district ====
- Allahlu, Khoda Afarin, village in Bastamlu Rural District, in the Central District
- Eskanlou-e-Sofla, village in Bastamlu Rural District, in the Central District
- Guy Aghaj, East Azerbaijan, village in Bastamlu Rural District, in the Central District
- Hesban, village in Bastamlu Rural District, in the Central District
- Ichi Daraq, village in Keyvan Rural District, in the Central District
- Kadkhodalu-ye Bala, village in Bastamlu Rural District, in the Central District
- Qareh Pachanlu, village in Bastamlu Rural District, in the Central District
- Quturlar, village in Bastamlu Rural District, in the Central District
- Shah Bodaghlu, village in Bastamlu Rural District, in the Central District
- Ashraf, East Azerbaijan, village in Keyvan Rural District, in the Central District
- Chenaqchi, village in Keyvan Rural District, in the Central District
- Dayan, Iran, village in Keyvan Rural District, in the Central District
- Hamdamlu, village in Keyvan Rural District, in the Central District
- Kargaran, village in Keyvan Rural District, in the Central District
- Kusalar, Khoda Afarin, village in Bastamlu Rural District, in the Central District

==== Keyvan Rural district ====
- Pir Hadian, village in Keyvan Rural District, in the Central District
- Qezel Yul, village in Keyvan Rural District, in the Central District
- Tin, Khoda Afarin, village in Keyvan Rural District, in the Central District
- Zarnaq, Khoda Afarin, village in Keyvan Rural District, in the Central District

=== Garamduz District ===
==== Garamduz-e Gharbi Rural district ====
- Agh Qeshlaq, village in Garamduz Rural District, Garamduz District
- Ahmadluy-e Olya, village in Garamduz Rural District, Garamduz District
- Askalu Mohammad Hasanlu, village in Garamduz Rural District, Garamduz District
- Gechi Qeshlaq-e Sofla, village in Garamduz Rural District, Garamduz District
- Gechi Qeshlaq-e Vosta, village in Garamduz Rural District, Garamduz District
- Hasan Qeshlaqi, village in Garamduz Rural District, Garamduz District
- Hasanlu, village in Garamduz Rural District, Garamduz District
- Hasratan, village in Garamduz Rural District, Garamduz District
- Homarahlu, village in Garamduz Rural District, Garamduz District
- Kohl Jik, village in Garamduz Rural District, Garamduz District
- Khalaf Beygluy-e Olya, village in Garamduz Rural District, Garamduz District
- Khalaf Beygluy-e Sofla, village in Garamduz Rural District, Garamduz District
- Khotai, village in Garamduz Rural District, Garamduz District
- Larijan, village in Garamduz-e Gharbi Rural District of Garamduz District
- Mirza Mohammadabad,village in Garamduz Rural District, Garamduz District
- Mohammad Alilu, village in Garamduz Rural District, Garamduz District
- Mohammad Salehu, village in Garamduz Rural District, Garamduz District
- Qarlujeh, village in Garamduz Rural District, Garamduz District
- Qeshlaq-e Hajj Lataf Ali, village in Garamduz Rural District, Garamduz District
- Qeshlaq-e Madadlu, village in Garamduz Rural District, Garamduz District
- Qeshlaq-e Moqaddam Shabandeh, village in Garamduz Rural District, Garamduz District
- Qeshlaq-e Yuzquyi, village in Garamduz Rural District, Garamduz District
- Qurtlujeh-e Olya, village in Garamduz Rural District, Garamduz District
- Sharfeh, village in Garamduz Rural District, Garamduz District

==== Garamduz-e Sharqi Rural district ====
- Mahmudabad, Khoda Afarin, village in Garamduz-e Sharqi Rural District of Garamduz District
