= Baqer Owghli =

Baqer Owghli باقراوغلي
- Village
- Location within Iran
- Coordinates: 39°19′49″N 47°15′49″E
- Country: Iran
- Province: East Azerbaijan
- County: Khoda Afarin
- Bakhsh: Garamduz
- Rural District: Garamduz

Population (2006)
  - Total: 332
- Time zone: UTC+3:30 (IRST)
  - Summer (DST): UTC+4:30 (IRDT)

Baqer Owghli (Persian: باقراوغلي, also Romanized as Bāqer Owghlī; also known as Bāqer Owghlū) is a village in Garamduz Rural District, Garamduz District, Khoda Afarin County, East Azerbaijan Province, Iran. At the 2006 census, its population was 332, in 73 families.
