= Qeshlaq-e Yuseflu =

Qeshlaq-e Yuseflu قشلاق يوسفلو
- Village
- Location within Iran
- Coordinates: 39°15′02″N 47°27′44″E
- Country: Iran
- Province: East Azerbaijan
- County: Khoda Afarin
- Bakhsh: Garamduz
- Rural District: Garamduz

Population (2006)
  - Total: 56
- Time zone: UTC+3:30 (IRST)
  - Summer (DST): UTC+4:30 (IRDT)

Qeshlaq-e Yuseflu (Persian: قشلاق يوسفلو, also Romanized as Qeshlāq-e Yūseflū; also known as Chākherlū and Chākheyrlū) is a village in Garamduz Rural District, Garamduz District, Khoda Afarin County, East Azerbaijan Province, Iran. At the 2006 census, its population was 56, in 10 families.
