= Parviz Khanlu =

Parviz Khanlu پرويزخانلو
- Village
- Location within Iran
- Coordinates: 39°17′51″N 47°10′35″E
- Country: Iran
- Province: East Azerbaijan
- County: Khoda Afarin
- Bakhsh: Garamduz
- Rural District: Garamduz

Population (2006)
  - Total: 258
- Time zone: UTC+3:30 (IRST)
  - Summer (DST): UTC+4:30 (IRDT)

Parviz Khanlu (Persian: پرويزخانلو, also Romanized as Parvīz Khānlū) is a village in Garamduz Rural District, Garamduz District, Khoda Afarin County, East Azerbaijan Province, Iran. At the 2006 census, its population was 258, in 57 families.
