= Gun Gowrmez =

Village in East Azerbaijan province, Iran

Gun Gowrmez Persian: گون گورمز
- Village
- Location within Iran
- Coordinates: 39°19′19″N 47°14′17″E
- Country: Iran
- Province: East Azerbaijan
- County: Khoda Afarin
- District: Garamduz
- Rural District: Garamduz-e Gharbi

Population (2016)
  - Total: 992
- Time zone: UTC+3:30 (IRST)

Gun Gowrmez (Persian: گون گورمز) (Note: Also romanized as Gūn Gowrmez) is a village in Garamduz-e Gharbi Rural District (Note: Formerly Garamduz Rural District) of Garamduz District in Khoda Afarin County, East Azerbaijan province, Iran.

== Demographics ==
=== Ethnicity ===
The village is populated by the Kurdish Chalabianlu tribe.

=== Population ===
At the time of the 2006 National Census, the village's population was 950 in 191 households, when it was in Garamduz Rural District (Note: Renamed Garamduz-e Gharbi Rural District) of the former Khoda Afarin District in Kaleybar County. The following census in 2011 counted 1,045 people in 252 households, by which time the district had been separated from the county in the establishment of Khoda Afarin County. The rural district was transferred to the new Garamduz District and renamed Garamduz-e Gharbi Rural District. The 2016 census measured the population of the village as 992 people in 295 households.
