= Qeshlaq-e Daghlu =

Qeshlaq-e Daghlu قشلاق داغلو
- Village
- Country: Iran
- Province: East Azerbaijan
- County: Khoda Afarin
- Bakhsh: Garamduz
- Rural District: Garamduz

Population (2006)
  - Total: 180
- Time zone: UTC+3:30 (IRST)
  - Summer (DST): UTC+4:30 (IRDT)

Qeshlaq-e Daghlu (Persian: قشلاق داغلو, also Romanized as Qeshlāq-e Dāghlū) is a village in Garamduz Rural District, Garamduz District, Khoda Afarin County, East Azerbaijan Province, Iran. At the 2006 census, its population was 180, in 36 families.
