= Qeshlaq-e Hasan Kangarlu =

Qeshlaq-e Hasan Kangarlu قشلاق حسن كنگرلو
- Village
- Location within Iran
- Coordinates: 39°16′37″N 47°19′51″E
- Country: Iran
- Province: East Azerbaijan
- County: Khoda Afarin
- Bakhsh: Garamduz
- Rural District: Garamduz

Population (2006)
  - Total: 215
- Time zone: UTC+3:30 (IRST)
  - Summer (DST): UTC+4:30 (IRDT)

Qeshlaq-e Hasan Kangarlu (Persian: قشلاق حسن كنگرلو, also Romanized as Qeshlāq-e Ḩasan Kangarlū; also known as Ḩasan Qeshlāqī-ye Kangarlū) is a village in Garamduz Rural District, Garamduz District, Khoda Afarin County, East Azerbaijan Province, Iran. At the 2006 census, its population was 215, in 45 families.
