= Larijan =

Larijan (Persian: لاریجان) may refer to:

- Larijan, East Azerbaijan
- Larijan-e Olya, East Azerbaijan Province
- Larijan-e Sofla, East Azerbaijan Province
- Lorijan, Markazi Province
- Larijan District, in Mazandaran Province
- Larijan Hot Spring
- Bala Larijan Rural District, in Mazandaran Province
