= Piranlu =

Piranlu (Persian: پيرانلو) may refer to:

- Piranlu, Ardabil
- Piranlu, East Azerbaijan
- Piranlu, Razavi Khorasan
