= Safarlu =

Village in East Azerbaijan province, Iran

Safarlu Persian: صفرلو
- Village
- Location within Iran
- Coordinates: 39°11′46″N 47°03′43″E
- Country: Iran
- Province: East Azerbaijan
- County: Khoda Afarin
- District: Central
- Rural District: Keyvan

Population (2016)
  - Total: 246
- Time zone: UTC+3:30 (IRST)

Safarlu (Persian: صفرلو) (Note: Also romanized as Şafarlū) is a village in Keyvan Rural District of the Central District in Khoda Afarin County, East Azerbaijan province, Iran.

In the wake of White Revolution (early 1960s) a clan of Mohammad Khanlu tribe, comprising 55 households, used Safarlu as their winter quarters.

== Demographics ==
=== Population ===
At the time of the 2006 National Census, the village's population was 298 in 72 households, when it was in the former Khoda Afarin District of Kaleybar County. The following census in 2011 counted 252 people in 66 households, by which time the district had been separated from the county in the establishment of Khoda Afarin County. The rural district was transferred to the new Central District. The 2016 census measured the population of the village as 246 people in 65 households.
