= Annablu =

Annablu عنابلو
- Village
- Location within Iran
- Coordinates: 39°15′01″N 47°10′00″E
- Country: Iran
- Province: East Azerbaijan
- County: Khoda Afarin
- Bakhsh: Garamduz
- Rural District: Garamduz

Population (2006)
  - Total: 283
- Time zone: UTC+3:30 (IRST)
  - Summer (DST): UTC+4:30 (IRDT)

Annablu (Persian: عنابلو, also Romanized as ‘Annāblū) is a village in Garamduz Rural District, Garamduz District, Khoda Afarin County, East Azerbaijan Province, Iran. At the 2006 census, its population was 283, in 54 families. The village is populated by the Kurdish Chalabianlu tribe.
