= Genanlu-ye Hasan Soltanlu =

Genanlu-ye Hasan Soltanlu گنانلوحسن سلطان لو
- Village
- Location within Iran
- Coordinates: 39°06′17″N 47°08′28″E
- Country: Iran
- Province: East Azerbaijan
- County: Khoda Afarin
- Bakhsh: Central
- Rural District: Keyvan

Population (2006)
  - Total: 36
- Time zone: UTC+3:30 (IRST)
  - Summer (DST): UTC+4:30 (IRDT)

Genanlu-ye Hasan Soltanlu (Persian: گنانلوحسن سلطان لو, also Romanized as Genānlū Ḩasan Solṭānlū; also known as Genānlū, Ghenānlū, and Gonānlū) is a village in Keyvan Rural District, in the Central District of Khoda Afarin County, East Azerbaijan Province, Iran. At the 2006 census, its population was 36, in 7 families.
