= Sari Beyglu =

Sari Beyglu ساري بيگلو
- Village
- Location within Iran
- Coordinates: 39°13′27″N 47°09′44″E
- Country: Iran
- Province: East Azerbaijan
- County: Khoda Afarin
- Bakhsh: Garamduz
- Rural District: Garamduz

Population (2006)
  - Total: 230
- Time zone: UTC+3:30 (IRST)
  - Summer (DST): UTC+4:30 (IRDT)

Sari Beyglu (Persian: ساري بيگلو, also Romanized as Sārī Beyglū; also known as Sārī Beyglū-ye Kūchak) is a village in Garamduz Rural District, Garamduz District, Khoda Afarin County, East Azerbaijan Province, Iran. At the 2006 census, its population was 230, in 41 families. The village is populated by the Kurdish Chalabianlu tribe.
