= Madineh Qeshlaqi =

Madineh Qeshlaqi مدينه قشلاقي
- Village
- Location within Iran
- Coordinates: 39°18′50″N 47°29′47″E
- Country: Iran
- Province: East Azerbaijan
- County: Khoda Afarin
- Bakhsh: Garamduz
- Rural District: Garamduz

Population (2006)
  - Total: 144
- Time zone: UTC+3:30 (IRST)
  - Summer (DST): UTC+4:30 (IRDT)

Madineh Qeshlaqi (Persian: مدينه قشلاقي, also Romanized as Madīneh Qeshlāqī; also known as Askalū Moḩammad Ḩasanlū) is a village in Garamduz Rural District, Garamduz District, Khoda Afarin County, East Azerbaijan Province, Iran. At the 2006 census, its population was 144, in 26 families.
