= Hamadan, East Azerbaijan =

Village in East Azerbaijan province, Iran

Hamadan Persian: همدان
- Village
- Location within Iran
- Coordinates: 39°08′02″N 46°58′53″E
- Country: Iran
- Province: East Azerbaijan
- County: Khoda Afarin
- District: Central
- Rural District: Keyvan

Population (2016)
  - Total: 131
- Time zone: UTC+3:30 (IRST)

Hamadan (Persian: همدان) (Note: Also romanized as Hamadān) is a village in Keyvan Rural District of the Central District in Khoda Afarin County, East Azerbaijan province, Iran.

== Demographics ==
=== Population ===
At the time of the 2006 National Census, the village's population was 126 in 41 households, when it was in the former Khoda Afarin District of Kaleybar County. The following census in 2011 counted 50 people in 16 households, by which time the district had been separated from the county in the establishment of Khoda Afarin County. The rural district was transferred to the new Central District. The 2016 census measured the population of the village as 131 people in 52 households.
