= Pir Hadian =

Pir Hadian پيرهاديان
- Village
- Location within Iran
- Coordinates: 39°05′06″N 46°59′44″E
- Country: Iran
- Province: East Azerbaijan
- County: Khoda Afarin
- Bakhsh: Central
- Rural District: Keyvan

Population (2006)
  - Total: 137
- Time zone: UTC+3:30 (IRST)
  - Summer (DST): UTC+4:30 (IRDT)

Pir Hadian (Persian: پيرهاديان, also Romanized as Pīr Hādīān) is a village in Keyvan Rural District, in the Central District of Khoda Afarin County, East Azerbaijan Province, Iran. At the 2006 census, its population was 137, in 31 families.
