= Sharfeh, East Azerbaijan =

Village in East Azerbaijan province, Iran

Sharfeh Persian: شرفه
- Village
- Location within Iran
- Coordinates: 39°17′15″N 47°08′26″E
- Country: Iran
- Province: East Azerbaijan
- County: Khoda Afarin
- District: Garamduz
- Rural District: Garamduz-e Gharbi

Population (2016)
  - Total: 697
- Time zone: UTC+3:30 (IRST)

Sharfeh (Persian: شرفه) is a village in Garamduz-e Gharbi Rural District (Note: Formerly Garamduz Rural District) of Garamduz District in Khoda Afarin County, East Azerbaijan province, Iran.

== Demographics ==
=== Ethnicity ===
The village is populated by the Kurdish Chalabianlu tribe.

=== Population ===
At the time of the 2006 National Census, the village's population was 604 in 133 households, when it was in Garamduz Rural District (Note: Renamed Garamduz-e Gharbi Rural District) of the former Khoda Afarin District in Kaleybar County. The following census in 2011 counted 683 people in 188 households, by which time the district had been separated from the county in the establishment of Khoda Afarin County. The rural district was transferred to the new Garamduz District and renamed Garamduz-e Gharbi Rural District. The 2016 census measured the population of the village as 697 people in 219 households.
