= Ashraf, East Azerbaijan =

Ashraf اشرف
- Village
- Location within Iran
- Coordinates: 39°03′44″N 47°02′54″E
- Country: Iran
- Province: East Azerbaijan
- County: Khoda Afarin
- Bakhsh: Central
- Rural District: Keyvan

Population (2006)
  - Total: 24
- Time zone: UTC+3:30 (IRST)
  - Summer (DST): UTC+4:30 (IRDT)

Ashraf (Persian: اشرف; in Armenian: Աշրապ) is a village in Keyvan Rural District, in the Central District of Khoda Afarin County, East Azerbaijan Province, Iran. At the 2006 census, its population was 24, in 7 families. The village is populated by the Kurdish Mohammad Khanlu tribe.
