= Yuseflu =

Yuseflu or Yusoflu (Persian: يوسفلو) may refer to:

- Yuseflu, Ahar
- Yusoflu, Khoda Afarin
