= Askalu Mohammad Hasanlu =

Askalu Mohammad Hasanlu اسكلو محمد حسنلو
- Village
- Country: Iran
- Province: East Azerbaijan
- County: Khoda Afarin
- Bakhsh: Garamduz
- Rural District: Garamduz

Population (2006)
  - Total: 214
- Time zone: UTC+3:30 (IRST)
  - Summer (DST): UTC+4:30 (IRDT)

Askalu Mohammad Hasanlu (Persian: اسكلو محمد حسنلو, also Romanized as Askalū Moḩammad Ḩasanlū) is a village in Garamduz Rural District, Garamduz District, Khoda Afarin County, East Azerbaijan Province, Iran. At the 2006 census, its population was 214, in 32 families.
