= Ahmadluy =

Ahmadluy (Persian: احمدلوي), also rendered as Ahmadlu, may refer to:

- Ahmadluy-e Olya
- Ahmadluy-e Sofla
