= Hasanlu, East Azerbaijan =

Hasanlu حسنلو
- Village
- Location within Iran
- Coordinates: 39°17′27″N 47°11′16″E
- Country: Iran
- Province: East Azerbaijan
- County: Khoda Afarin
- Bakhsh: Garamduz
- Rural District: Garamduz

Population (2006)
  - Total: 52
- Time zone: UTC+3:30 (IRST)
  - Summer (DST): UTC+4:30 (IRDT)

Hasanlu (Persian: حسنلو, also Romanized as Ḩasanlū) is a village in Garamduz Rural District, Garamduz District, Khoda Afarin County, East Azerbaijan Province, Iran. At the 2006 census, its population was 52, in 12 families.
