= Kadkhodalu-ye Bala =

Village in East Azerbaijan province, Iran

Kadkhodalu-ye Bala Persian: كدخدالوبالا
- Village
- Location within Iran
- Coordinates: 39°15′41″N 47°06′50″E
- Country: Iran
- Province: East Azerbaijan
- County: Khoda Afarin
- District: Central
- Rural District: Bastamlu

Population (2016)
  - Total: 322
- Time zone: UTC+3:30 (IRST)

Kadkhodalu-ye Bala (Persian: كدخدالوبالا) (Note: Also romanized as Kadkhodālū-ye Bālā; also known as Kadkhodālū-ye ‘Olyā) is a village in Bastamlu Rural District of the Central District in Khoda Afarin County, East Azerbaijan province, Iran.

== Demographics ==
=== Population ===
At the time of the 2006 National Census, the village's population was 368 in 71 households, when it was in the former Khoda Afarin District of Kaleybar County. The following census in 2011 counted 372 people in 96 households, by which time the district had been separated from the county in the establishment of Khoda Afarin County. The rural district was transferred to the new Central District. The 2016 census measured the population of the village as 322 people in 88 households.
