= Tin, Khoda Afarin =

Tin طين
- Village
- Location within Iran
- Coordinates: 39°02′01″N 47°06′37″E
- Country: Iran
- Province: East Azerbaijan
- County: Khoda Afarin
- Bakhsh: Central
- Rural District: Keyvan

Population (2006)
  - Total: 28
- Time zone: UTC+3:30 (IRST)
  - Summer (DST): UTC+4:30 (IRDT)

Tin (Persian: طين, also Romanized as Ţīn and Tīn) is a village in Keyvan Rural District, in the Central District of Khoda Afarin County, East Azerbaijan Province, Iran. At the 2006 census, its population was 28, in 8 families. The village is populated by the Kurdish Mohammad Khanlu tribe.
