= Kargaran =

Kargaran كارگران
- Village
- Location within Iran
- Coordinates: 39°04′17″N 46°58′40″E
- Country: Iran
- Province: East Azerbaijan
- County: Khoda Afarin
- Bakhsh: Central
- Rural District: Keyvan

Population (2006)
  - Total: 26
- Time zone: UTC+3:30 (IRST)
  - Summer (DST): UTC+4:30 (IRDT)

Kargaran (Persian: كارگران, also Romanized as Kārgarān) is a village in Keyvan Rural District, in the Central District of Khoda Afarin County, East Azerbaijan Province, Iran. At the 2006 census, its population was 26, in 6 families. The village is populated by the Kurdish Mohammad Khanlu tribe.
