= Homarahlu =

Coordinates: 39°17′14″N 47°09′29″E

Hamarahlu همراهلو
- Village
- Interactive map of Hamarahlu
- Country: Iran
- Province: East Azerbaijan
- County: Khoda Afarin
- Bakhsh: Garamduz
- Rural District: Garamduz

Population (2006)
  - Total: 70
- Time zone: UTC+3:30 (IRST)
  - Summer (DST): UTC+4:30 (IRDT)

Hamarahlu (Persian: همراهلو, also Romanized as Hamarāhlū) is a village in Garamduz Rural District, Garamduz District, Khoda Afarin County, East Azerbaijan Province, Iran. At the 2006 census, its population was 170, in 45 families.
