= Mohammad Salahlu =

Village in East Azerbaijan Province, Iran

Mohammad Salahlu محمدصالحلو
- Village
- Location within Iran
- Coordinates: 39°17′27″N 47°10′14″E
- Country: Iran
- Province: East Azerbaijan
- County: Khoda Afarin
- Bakhsh: Garamduz
- Rural District: Garamduz

Population (2006)
  - Total: 419
- Time zone: UTC+3:30 (IRST)
  - Summer (DST): UTC+4:30 (IRDT)

Mohammad Salahlu (Persian: محمدصالحلو, also Romanized as Moḩammad Şālaḩlū) is a village in Garamduz Rural District, Garamduz District, Khoda Afarin County, East Azerbaijan Province, Iran. At the 2006 census, its population was 419, in 78 families. The village is populated by the Kurdish Chalabianlu tribe.
