= Davdan =

Davdan (Persian: داودان) may refer to:

- Davdan-e Bala
- Davdan-e Pain
