= Qeshlaq-e Yuzquyi =

Qeshlaq-e Yuzquyi قشلاق يوزقويي
- Village
- Location within Iran
- Coordinates: 39°16′33″N 47°09′13″E
- Country: Iran
- Province: East Azerbaijan
- County: Khoda Afarin
- Bakhsh: Garamduz
- Rural District: Garamduz

Population (2006)
  - Total: 66
- Time zone: UTC+3:30 (IRST)
  - Summer (DST): UTC+4:30 (IRDT)

Qeshlaq-e Yuzquyi (Persian: قشلاق يوزقويي, also Romanized as Qeshlāq-e Yūzqūyī; also known as Seyyedlar) is a village located in Garamduz Rural District, within Garamduz District, Khoda Afarin County in the East Azerbaijan Province of Iran. According to the 2006 census, the village had a population of 66, residing in 13 families.
