= Qeshlaq-e Piranlu =

Qeshlaq-e Piranlu قشلاق پيرانلو
- Village
- Location within Iran
- Coordinates: 39°08′44″N 47°02′09″E
- Country: Iran
- Province: East Azerbaijan
- County: Khoda Afarin
- Bakhsh: Central
- Rural District: Keyvan

Population (2006)
  - Total: 35
- Time zone: UTC+3:30 (IRST)
  - Summer (DST): UTC+4:30 (IRDT)

Qeshlaq-e Piranlu (Persian: قشلاق پيرانلو, also Romanized as Qeshlāq-e Pīrānlū; also known as Pīrānlū) is a village in Keyvan Rural District, in the Central District of Khoda Afarin County, East Azerbaijan Province, Iran. At the 2006 census, its population was 35, in 8 families.
