= Qeshlaq-e Madadlu =

Qeshlaq-e Madadlu قشلاق مددلو
- Village
- Location within Iran
- Coordinates: 39°18′59″N 47°21′29″E
- Country: Iran
- Province: East Azerbaijan
- County: Khoda Afarin
- Bakhsh: Garamduz
- Rural District: Garamduz

Population (2006)
  - Total: 107
- Time zone: UTC+3:30 (IRST)
  - Summer (DST): UTC+4:30 (IRDT)

Qeshlaq-e Madadlu (Persian: قشلاق مددلو, also Romanized as Qeshlāq-e Madadlū) is a village in Garamduz Rural District, Garamduz District, Khoda Afarin County, East Azerbaijan Province, Iran. At the 2006 census, its population was 107, in 28 families.
