= Agh Qeshlaq, Khoda Afarin =

Agh Qeshlaq اغ قشلاق
- Village
- Location within Iran
- Coordinates: 39°16′54″N 47°21′26″E
- Country: Iran
- Province: East Azerbaijan
- County: Khoda Afarin
- Bakhsh: Garamduz
- Rural District: Garamduz

Population (2006)
  - Total: 62
- Time zone: UTC+3:30 (IRST)
  - Summer (DST): UTC+4:30 (IRDT)

Agh Qeshlaq (Persian: اغ قشلاق, also Romanized as Āgh Qeshlāq) is a village in Garamduz Rural District, Garamduz District, Khoda Afarin County, East Azerbaijan Province, Iran. At the 2006 census, its population was 62, in 12 families.
