= Qeshlaq-e Hajj Lataf Ali =

Qeshlaq-e Hajj Lataf Ali قشلاق حاج لطفعلي
- Village
- Country: Iran
- Province: East Azerbaijan
- County: Khoda Afarin
- Bakhsh: Garamduz
- Rural District: Garamduz

Population (2006)
  - Total: 54
- Time zone: UTC+3:30 (IRST)
  - Summer (DST): UTC+4:30 (IRDT)

Qeshlaq-e Hajj Lataf Ali (Persian: قشلاق حاج لطفعلي, also Romanized as Qeshlāq-e Ḩājj Laṭaf ʿAlī) is a village in Garamduz Rural District, Garamduz District, Khoda Afarin County, East Azerbaijan Province, Iran. At the 2006 census, its population was 54, in 16 families.
