= Hasan Qeshlaqi =

Hasan Qeshlaqi حسن قشلاقي
- Village
- Location within Iran
- Coordinates: 39°16′11″N 47°18′49″E
- Country: Iran
- Province: East Azerbaijan
- County: Khoda Afarin
- Bakhsh: Garamduz
- Rural District: Garamduz

Population (2006)
  - Total: 42
- Time zone: UTC+3:30 (IRST)
  - Summer (DST): UTC+4:30 (IRDT)

Hasan Qeshlaqi (Persian: حسن قشلاقي, also Romanized as Ḩasan Qeshlāqī; also known as ‘Alī Qolī Qeshlāqī) is a village in Garamduz Rural District, Garamduz District, Khoda Afarin County, East Azerbaijan Province, Iran. At the 2006 census, its population was 42, in 10 families.
