= Zanbalan, East Azerbaijan =

Village in East Azerbaijan province, Iran

Zanbalan Persian: زنبلان
- Village
- Location within Iran
- Coordinates: 39°08′05″N 46°57′59″E
- Country: Iran
- Province: East Azerbaijan
- County: Khoda Afarin
- District: Central
- Rural District: Keyvan

Population (2016)
  - Total: 330
- Time zone: UTC+3:30 (IRST)

Zanbalan (Persian: زنبلان) (Note: Also romanized as Zanbalān and Zonbalan) is a village in Keyvan Rural District of the Central District in Khoda Afarin County, East Azerbaijan province, Iran.

== Demographics ==
=== Population ===
At the time of the 2006 National Census, the village's population was 372 in 80 households, when it was in the former Khoda Afarin District of Kaleybar County. The following census in 2011 counted 352 people in 97 households, by which time the district had been separated from the county in the establishment of Khoda Afarin County. The rural district was transferred to the new Central District. The 2016 census measured the population of the village as 330 people in 107 households. It was the most populous village in its rural district.
