= Hoseynali Beyglu =

Hoseynali Beyglu حسينعلي بيگلو
- Village
- Location within Iran
- Coordinates: 39°11′24″N 47°08′02″E
- Country: Iran
- Province: East Azerbaijan
- County: Khoda Afarin
- Bakhsh: Central
- Rural District: Bastamlu

Population (2006)
  - Total: 137
- Time zone: UTC+3:30 (IRST)
  - Summer (DST): UTC+4:30 (IRDT)

Hoseynali Beyglu (Persian: حسينعلي بيگلو, also Romanized as Ḩoseyn‘alī Beyglū and Ḩoseyn ‘Alī-ye Beyglū) is a village in Bastamlu Rural District, in the Central District of Khoda Afarin County, East Azerbaijan Province, Iran. At the 2006 census, its population was 137, in 30 families.
