= Ichi Daraq =

Ichi Daraq ايچي درق
- Village
- Location within Iran
- Coordinates: 39°04′26″N 47°06′13″E
- Country: Iran
- Province: East Azerbaijan
- County: Khoda Afarin
- Bakhsh: Central
- Rural District: Keyvan

Population (2006)
  - Total: 10
- Time zone: UTC+3:30 (IRST)
  - Summer (DST): UTC+4:30 (IRDT)

Ichi Daraq (Persian: ايچي درق, also Romanized as Īchī Daraq) is a village in Keyvan Rural District, in the Central District of Khoda Afarin County, East Azerbaijan Province, Iran. At the 2006 census, its population was 10, in 4 families.
