= Larijan-e Sofla =

Larijan-e Sofla لاریجان سفلی
- Village
- Location within Iran
- Coordinates: 39°08′59″N 47°00′57″E
- Country: Iran
- Province: East Azerbaijan
- County: Khoda Afarin
- Bakhsh: Central
- Rural District: Keyvan

Population (2006)
  - Total: 117
- Time zone: UTC+3:30 (IRST)
  - Summer (DST): UTC+4:30 (IRDT)

Larijan-e Sofla (Persian: لاریجان سفلی, also Romanized as Lārījān-e Soflā; also known as Lārījān-e Pā'īn) is a village in Keyvan Rural District, in the Central District of Khoda Afarin County, East Azerbaijan Province, Iran. At the 2006 census, its population was 117, in 32 families. The village is populated by the Kurdish Mohammad Khanlu tribe.
