= Ahmadluy-e Sofla =

Ahmadluy-e Sofla احمدلوي سفلي
- Village
- Location within Iran
- Coordinates: 39°16′14″N 47°08′19″E
- Country: Iran
- Province: East Azerbaijan
- County: Khoda Afarin
- Bakhsh: Garamduz
- Rural District: Garamduz

Population (2006)
  - Total: 91
- Time zone: UTC+3:30 (IRST)
  - Summer (DST): UTC+4:30 (IRDT)

Ahmadluy-e Sofla (Persian: احمدلوي سفلي, also Romanized as Aḩmadlūy-e Soflá; also known as Aḩmadlū-ye Pā’īn and Aḩmadlū-ye Soflá) is a village in Garamduz Rural District, Garamduz District, Khoda Afarin County, East Azerbaijan Province, Iran. At the 2006 census, its population was 91, in 21 families.
