= Qeshlaq-e Owzbak =

Village in East Azerbaijan province, Iran

Qeshlaq-e Owzbak Persian: قشلاق اوزبك
- Village
- Location within Iran
- Coordinates: 39°13′48″N 47°17′40″E
- Country: Iran
- Province: East Azerbaijan
- County: Khoda Afarin
- District: Garamduz
- Rural District: Garamduz-e Gharbi

Population (2016)
  - Total: 670
- Time zone: UTC+3:30 (IRST)

Qeshlaq-e Owzbak (Persian: قشلاق اوزبك) (Note: Also romanized as Qeshlāq-e Owzbak; also known as Ozbak and Qeshlāq-e Ozbak) is a village in Garamduz-e Gharbi Rural District (Note: Formerly Garamduz Rural District) of Garamduz District in Khoda Afarin County, East Azerbaijan province, Iran.

== Demographics ==
=== Population ===
At the time of the 2006 National Census, the village's population was 559 in 113 households, when it was in Qeshlaq Rural District of Abesh Ahmad District in Kaleybar County. The following census in 2011 counted 689 people in 172 households, by which time the village had been separated from the county in the establishment of Khoda Afarin County. Qeshlaq-e Owzbak was transferred to Garamduz-e Gharbi Rural District of the new Garamduz District. The 2016 census measured the population of the village as 670 people in 180 households.
