= Mirza Mohammadabad =

Mirza Mohammadabad ميرزامحمداباد
- Village
- Country: Iran
- Province: East Azerbaijan
- County: Khoda Afarin
- Bakhsh: Garamduz
- Rural District: Garamduz

Population (2006)
  - Total: 48
- Time zone: UTC+3:30 (IRST)
  - Summer (DST): UTC+4:30 (IRDT)

Mirza Mohammadabad (Persian: ميرزامحمداباد, also Romanized as Mīrzā Moḩammadābād) is a village in Garamduz Rural District, Garamduz District, Khoda Afarin County, East Azerbaijan Province, Iran. At the 2006 census, its population was 48, in 9 families.
