= Larijan-e Olya =

Larijan-e Olya لاریجان علیا
- Village
- Location within Iran
- Coordinates: 39°08′24″N 47°00′58″E
- Country: Iran
- Province: East Azerbaijan
- County: Khoda Afarin
- Bakhsh: Central
- Rural District: Keyvan

Population (2006)
  - Total: 62
- Time zone: UTC+3:30 (IRST)
  - Summer (DST): UTC+4:30 (IRDT)

Larijan-e Olya (Persian: لاریجان علیا, also Romanized as Lārījān-e ‘Olyā; also known as Lārījān-e Bālā) is a village in Keyvan Rural District, in the Central District of Khoda Afarin County, East Azerbaijan Province, Iran. At the 2006 census, its population was 62, in 16 families. The village is populated by the Kurdish Mohammad Khanlu tribe.
