= Allahlu =

Allahlu or Lalahlu or Lalehlu (Persian: لله لو) may refer to:

- Allahlu, Ardabil
- Allahlu, Khoda Afarin, East Azerbaijan province
- Allahlu, Mianeh, East Azerbaijan province
- Allahlu, Varzaqan, East Azerbaijan province
- Lalahlu-ye Torab, West Azerbaijan province
