= Garamduz =

Garamduz (Persian: گرمادوز) may refer to:

- Garamduz District
- Garamduz Rural District
