= Gechi Qeshlaq-e Sofla =

Gechi Qeshlaq-e Sofla گچي قشلاق سفلي
- Village
- Location within Iran
- Coordinates: 39°12′54″N 47°31′48″E
- Country: Iran
- Province: East Azerbaijan
- County: Khoda Afarin
- Bakhsh: Garamduz
- Rural District: Garamduz

Population (2006)
  - Total: 74
- Time zone: UTC+3:30 (IRST)
  - Summer (DST): UTC+4:30 (IRDT)

Gechi Qeshlaq-e Sofla (Persian: گچي قشلاق سفلي, also Romanized as Gechī Qeshlāq-e Soflá; also known as 'Gechī Qeshlāq-e Pā'īn) is a village in Garamduz Rural District, Garamduz District, Khoda Afarin County, East Azerbaijan Province, Iran. At the 2006 census, its population was 74, in 16 families.
