= Kohl Jik =

Kohl Jik كهل جيك
- Village
- Location within Iran
- Coordinates: 39°15′02″N 47°14′09″E
- Country: Iran
- Province: East Azerbaijan
- County: Khoda Afarin
- Bakhsh: Garamduz
- Rural District: Garamduz

Population (2006)
  - Total: 67
- Time zone: UTC+3:30 (IRST)
  - Summer (DST): UTC+4:30 (IRDT)

Kohl Jik (Persian: كهل جيك, also Romanized as Kohl Jīk) is a village in Garamduz Rural District, Garamduz District, Khoda Afarin County, East Azerbaijan Province, Iran. At the 2006 census, its population was 67, in 10 families.
