= Qezel Yul =

Village in East Azerbaijan province, Iran

Qezel Yul Persian: قزل يول
- Village
- Location within Iran
- Coordinates: 39°08′10″N 47°05′31″E
- Country: Iran
- Province: East Azerbaijan
- County: Khoda Afarin
- District: Central
- Rural District: Keyvan

Population (2016)
  - Total: 151
- Time zone: UTC+3:30 (IRST)

Qezel Yul (Persian: قزل يول) (Note: Also romanized as Qezel Yūl; also known as Qezel Yāl and Qezel Yol) is a village in Keyvan Rural District of the Central District in Khoda Afarin County, East Azerbaijan province, Iran.

== Demographics ==
=== Population ===
At the time of the 2006 National Census, the village's population was 239 in 50 households, when it was in the former Khoda Afarin District of Kaleybar County. The following census in 2011 counted 210 people in 55 households, by which time the district had been separated from the county in the establishment of Khoda Afarin County. The rural district was transferred to the new Central District. The 2016 census measured the population of the village as 151 people in 49 households.
