= Khotai =

Coordinates: 39°17′28″N 47°12′27″E

Khotai خطاي
- Village
- Interactive map of Khotai
- Country: Iran
- Province: East Azerbaijan
- County: Khoda Afarin
- Bakhsh: Garamduz
- Rural District: Garamduz

Population (2006)
  - Total: 180
- Time zone: UTC+3:30 (IRST)
  - Summer (DST): UTC+4:30 (IRDT)

Khotai (Persian: خطاي, also Romanized as Khoṭāī) is a village in Garamduz Rural District, Garamduz District, Khoda Afarin County, East Azerbaijan Province, Iran. At the 2006 census, its population was 180, in 35 families.
