= Gechi Qeshlaq-e Vosta =

Gechi Qeshlaq-e Vosta گچي قشلاق وسطي
- Village
- Location within Iran
- Coordinates: 39°19′06″N 47°26′53″E
- Country: Iran
- Province: East Azerbaijan
- County: Khoda Afarin
- Bakhsh: Garamduz
- Rural District: Garamduz

Population (2006)
  - Total: 87
- Time zone: UTC+3:30 (IRST)
  - Summer (DST): UTC+4:30 (IRDT)

Gechi Qeshlaq-e Vosta (Persian: گچي قشلاق وسطي, also Romanized as Gechī Qeshlāq-e Vosţá; also known as Gechī Qeshlāqī and Kechī Qeshlāqī) is a village in Garamduz Rural District, Garamduz District, Khoda Afarin County, East Azerbaijan Province, Iran. At the 2006 census, its population was 87, in 17 families.
