= Qeshlaq-e Moqaddam Shabandeh =

Qeshlaq-e Moqaddam Shabandeh قشلاق مقدم شابنده
- Village
- Location within Iran
- Coordinates: 39°19′51″N 47°22′34″E
- Country: Iran
- Province: East Azerbaijan
- County: Khoda Afarin
- Bakhsh: Garamduz
- Rural District: Garamduz

Population (2006)
  - Total: 285
- Time zone: UTC+3:30 (IRST)
  - Summer (DST): UTC+4:30 (IRDT)

Qeshlaq-e Moqaddam Shabandeh (Persian: قشلاق مقدم شابنده, also Romanized as Qeshlāq-e Moqaddam Shābandeh; also known as Qeshlāq-e Shāhbandeh and Qeshlāq-e Moqaddam) is a village in Garamduz Rural District, Garamduz District, Khoda Afarin County, East Azerbaijan Province, Iran. According to the 2006 census, it had a population was 285 people, comprising 59 families. The village is inhabited by members of the Kurdish Chalabianlu tribe.
