= Dayan, Iran =

Dayan دايان
- Village
- Location within Iran
- Coordinates: 39°05′48″N 47°05′39″E
- Country: Iran
- Province: East Azerbaijan
- County: Khoda Afarin
- Bakhsh: Central
- Rural District: Keyvan

Population (2006)
  - Total: 46
- Time zone: UTC+3:30 (IRST)
  - Summer (DST): UTC+4:30 (IRDT)

Dayan (Persian: دايان, also Romanized as Dāyān) is a village in Keyvan Rural District, in the Central District of Khoda Afarin County, East Azerbaijan Province, Iran. According to 2006 census, its population was 46, in 10 families.
