= Kusalar, Khoda Afarin =

Kusalar كوسالار
- Village
- Location within Iran
- Coordinates: 39°12′09″N 47°14′05″E
- Country: Iran
- Province: East Azerbaijan
- County: Khoda Afarin
- Bakhsh: Central
- Rural District: Bastamlu

Population (2006)
  - Total: 155
- Time zone: UTC+3:30 (IRST)
  - Summer (DST): UTC+4:30 (IRDT)

Kusalar (Persian: كوسالار, also Romanized as Kūsālār; also known as Kūhsālār) is a village in Bastamlu Rural District, in the Central District of Khoda Afarin County, East Azerbaijan Province, Iran. At the 2006 census, its population was 155, in 31 families.
