= Chaikhana =

Chaikhana may refer to:

- Teahouse
- Chaikhana, Iran, a village in East Azerbaijan Province, Iran
