= Qareh Pachanlu =

Qareh Pachanlu قره پاچانلو
- Village
- Location within Iran
- Coordinates: 39°13′34″N 47°14′36″E
- Country: Iran
- Province: East Azerbaijan
- County: Khoda Afarin
- Bakhsh: Central
- Rural District: Bastamlu

Population (2006)
  - Total: 47
- Time zone: UTC+3:30 (IRST)
  - Summer (DST): UTC+4:30 (IRDT)

Qareh Pachanlu (Persian: قره پاچانلو, also Romanized as Qāreh Pāchānlū; also known as Shāhūnī and Shāh Valī) is a village in Bastamlu Rural District, in the Central District of Khoda Afarin County, East Azerbaijan Province, Iran. At the 2006 census, its population was 47, in 11 families. The village is populated by the Kurdish Chalabianlu tribe.
