= Khoinarev =

Khoinarev may refer to:

- Khunirud
- Khaneqah, Khoda Afarin
