= Zanbalan =

Zanbalan or Zonbalan (Persian: زنبلان) may refer to:

- Zanbalan, East Azerbaijan
- Zonbalan, West Azerbaijan
