= Ahmadluy-e Olya =

Ahmadluy-e Olya احمدلوي عليا
- Village
- Location within Iran
- Coordinates: 39°15′55″N 47°09′10″E
- Country: Iran
- Province: East Azerbaijan
- County: Khoda Afarin
- Bakhsh: Garamduz
- Rural District: Garamduz

Population (2006)
  - Total: 248
- Time zone: UTC+3:30 (IRST)
  - Summer (DST): UTC+4:30 (IRDT)

Ahmadluy-e Olya (Persian: احمدلوي عليا, also Romanized as Aḩmadlūy-e ‘Olyā; also known as Aḩmadlū-ye Bālā and Aḩmadlū-ye ‘Olyā) is a village in Garamduz Rural District, Garamduz District, Khoda Afarin County, East Azerbaijan Province, Iran. At the 2006 census, its population was 248, in 46 families.
