= Shah Bodaghlu =

Shah Bodaghlu شاه بداغلو
- village
- Location within Iran
- Coordinates: 39°10′25″N 47°09′25″E
- Country: Iran
- Province: East Azerbaijan
- County: Khoda Afarin
- Bakhsh: Central
- Rural District: Bastamlu

Population (2006)
  - Total: 91
- Time zone: UTC+3:30 (IRST)
  - Summer (DST): UTC+4:30 (IRDT)

Shah Bodaghlu (Persian: شاه بداغلو, also Romanized as Shāh Bodāghlū) is a village in Bastamlu Rural District, in the Central District of Khoda Afarin County, East Azerbaijan Province, Iran. At the 2006 census, its population was 91, in 21 families.
