= Davdan-e Bala =

Davdan-e Bala داودان بالا
- Village
- Location within Iran
- Coordinates: 39°14′16″N 47°04′23″E
- Country: Iran
- Province: East Azerbaijan
- County: Khoda Afarin
- Bakhsh: Central
- Rural District: Bastamlu

Population (2006)
  - Total: 194
- Time zone: UTC+3:30 (IRST)
  - Summer (DST): UTC+4:30 (IRDT)

Davdan-e Bala (Persian: داودان بالا, also Romanized as Dāvdān-e Bālā; also known as Dāvdān-e ‘Olyā) is a village in Bastamlu Rural District, in the Central District of Khoda Afarin County, East Azerbaijan Province, Iran. At the 2006 census, its population was 194, in 40 families.
