= Hesban =

Hesban حسبان
- Village
- Location within Iran
- Coordinates: 39°12′35″N 47°10′42″E
- Country: Iran
- Province: East Azerbaijan
- County: Khoda Afarin
- Bakhsh: Central
- Rural District: Bastamlu

Population (2006)
  - Total: 67
- Time zone: UTC+3:30 (IRST)
  - Summer (DST): UTC+4:30 (IRDT)

Hesban (Persian: حسبان, also Romanized as Ḩesbān; also known as Ḩesbānlū) is a village in Bastamlu Rural District, in the Central District of Khoda Afarin County, East Azerbaijan Province, Iran. At the 2006 census, its population was 67, in 12 families.
