= Khalaf Beygluy-e Sofla =

Village in East Azerbaijan, Iran

Khalaf Beygluy-e Sofla خلف بيگلوي سفلي
- Village
- Location within Iran
- Coordinates: 39°21′07″N 47°17′42″E
- Country: Iran
- Province: East Azerbaijan
- County: Khoda Afarin
- Bakhsh: Garamduz
- Rural District: Garamduz

Population (2006)
  - Total: 161
- Time zone: UTC+3:30 (IRST)
  - Summer (DST): UTC+4:30 (IRDT)

Khalaf Beygluy-e Sofla (Persian: خلف بيگلوي سفلي, also Romanized as Khalaf Beyglūy-e Soflá; also known as Halāk Beyglū, Khalaf Beyglū, and Khalaf Beyglū-ye Pā'īn) is a village in Garamduz Rural District, Garamduz District, Khoda Afarin County, East Azerbaijan Province, Iran. At the 2006 census, its population was 161, in 36 families.
