= Davdan-e Pain =

Davdan-e Pain داودان پائين
- Village
- Location within Iran
- Coordinates: 39°14′36″N 47°04′58″E
- Country: Iran
- Province: East Azerbaijan
- County: Khoda Afarin
- Bakhsh: Central
- Rural District: Bastamlu

Population (2006)
  - Total: 67
- Time zone: UTC+3:30 (IRST)
  - Summer (DST): UTC+4:30 (IRDT)

Davdan-e Pain (Persian: داودان پائين, also Romanized as Dāvdān-e Pā'īn) is a village in Bastamlu Rural District, in the Central District of Khoda Afarin County, East Azerbaijan Province, Iran. At the 2006 census, its population was 67, in 12 families.
