= Quturlar =

Quturlar قوتورلار
- Village
- Location within Iran
- Coordinates: 39°11′18″N 47°11′57″E
- Country: Iran
- Province: East Azerbaijan
- County: Khoda Afarin
- Bakhsh: Central
- Rural District: Bastamlu

Population (2006)
  - Total: 88
- Time zone: UTC+3:30 (IRST)
  - Summer (DST): UTC+4:30 (IRDT)

Quturlar (Persian: قوتورلار, also Romanized as Qūtūrlār; also known as Qaţūrlār) is a village in Bastamlu Rural District, in the Central District of Khoda Afarin County, East Azerbaijan Province, Iran. At the 2006 census, its population was 88, in 15 families.
