= Pesyan, Khoda Afarin =

Village in East Azerbaijan province, Iran

Pesyan Persian: پسيان
- Village
- Location within Iran
- Coordinates: 38°56′34″N 46°41′19″E
- Country: Iran
- Province: East Azerbaijan
- County: Khoda Afarin
- District: Manjavan
- Rural District: Manjavan-e Gharbi

Population (2016)
  - Total: 247
- Time zone: UTC+3:30 (IRST)

Pesyan (Persian: پسيان) (Note: Also romanized as Pesyān; also known as Pasiyan, Pesyānlū, and Pisian) is a village in Manjavan-e Gharbi Rural District of Manjavan District in Khoda Afarin County, East Azerbaijan province, Iran.

== Demographics ==
=== Population ===
At the time of the 2006 National Census, the village's population was 240 in 45 households, when it was in the former Khoda Afarin District of Kaleybar County. The following census in 2011 counted 221 people in 47 households, by which time the district had been separated from the county in the establishment of Khoda Afarin County. The rural district was transferred to the new Manjavan District. The 2016 census measured the population of the village as 247 people in 80 households.
