= Khalaf Beygluy =

Khalaf Beygluy (Persian: خلف بيگلوي), also rendered as Khalaf Beyglu, may refer to:

- Khalaf Beygluy-e Olya
- Khalaf Beygluy-e Sofla
