= Guy Aghaj =

Guy Aghaj (Persian: گوي اغاج) may refer to:

- Guy Aghaj, East Azerbaijan
- Guy Aghaj, West Azerbaijan
