= Guy Aghaj, East Azerbaijan =

Guy Aghaj گوی‌آغاج
- Village
- Location within Iran
- Coordinates: 39°09′59″N 47°08′42″E
- Country: Iran
- Province: East Azerbaijan
- County: Khoda Afarin
- Bakhsh: Central
- Rural District: Bastamlu

Population (2006)
  - Total: 48
- Time zone: UTC+3:30 (IRST)
  - Summer (DST): UTC+4:30 (IRDT)

Guy Aghaj (Persian: گوی‌آغاج, also Romanized as Gūy Āghāj; also known as Gū Āghāj and Gūy Āghāch) is a village in Bastamlu Rural District, in the Central District of Khoda Afarin County, East Azerbaijan Province, Iran. At the 2006 census, its population was 48, in 9 families.
