= Vinaq =

Vinaq وينق
- Village
- Location within Iran
- Coordinates: 39°00′43″N 46°50′07″E
- Country: Iran
- Province: East Azerbaijan
- County: Khoda Afarin
- Bakhsh: Minjavan
- Rural District: Minjavan-e Sharqi

Population (2006)
  - Total: 141
- Time zone: UTC+3:30 (IRST)
  - Summer (DST): UTC+4:30 (IRDT)

Vinaq (Persian: وينق, also Romanized as Vīnaq; also known as Vinek; in Armenian: Վինէ) is a village in Minjavan-e Sharqi Rural District, Minjavan District, Khoda Afarin County, East Azerbaijan Province, Iran. At the 2006 census, its population was 141, in 32 families.
