= Allahlu, Khoda Afarin =

Allahlu لله لو
- Village
- Location within Iran
- Coordinates: 39°12′39″N 47°07′31″E
- Country: Iran
- Province: East Azerbaijan
- County: Khoda Afarin
- Bakhsh: Central
- Rural District: Bastamlu

Population (2006)
  - Total: 115
- Time zone: UTC+3:30 (IRST)
  - Summer (DST): UTC+4:30 (IRDT)

Allahlu (Persian: لله لو, also Romanized as Allahlū; also known as Lalehlū and Lalahlū) is a village in Bastamlu Rural District, in the Central District of Khoda Afarin County, East Azerbaijan Province, Iran. At the 2006 census, its population was 115, in 27 families. The village is populated by the Kurdish Chalabianlu tribe.
