= Larijan, East Azerbaijan =

Village in East Azerbaijan province, Iran

Larijan Persian: لاريجان
- Village
- Location within Iran
- Coordinates: 39°18′14″N 47°11′53″E
- Country: Iran
- Province: East Azerbaijan
- County: Khoda Afarin
- District: Garamduz
- Rural District: Garamduz-e Gharbi

Population (2016)
  - Total: 1,094
- Time zone: UTC+3:30 (IRST)

Larijan (Persian: لاريجان) (Note: Also romanized as Lārījān) is a village in Garamduz-e Gharbi Rural District (Note: Formerly Garamduz Rural District) of Garamduz District in Khoda Afarin County, East Azerbaijan province, Iran, serving as capital of both the district and the rural district.

== Demographics ==
=== Population ===
At the time of the 2006 National Census, the village's population was 964 in 230 households, when it was in Garamduz Rural District (Note: Renamed Garamduz-e Gharbi Rural District) of the former Khoda Afarin District in Kaleybar County. The following census in 2011 counted 1,156 people in 305 households, by which time the district had been separated from the county in the establishment of Khoda Afarin County. The rural district was transferred to the new Garamduz District and renamed Garamduz-e Gharbi Rural District. The 2016 census measured the population of the village as 1,094 people in 335 households. It was the most populous village in its rural district.
