= Alherd, Khoda Afarin =

Alherd الهرد
- Village
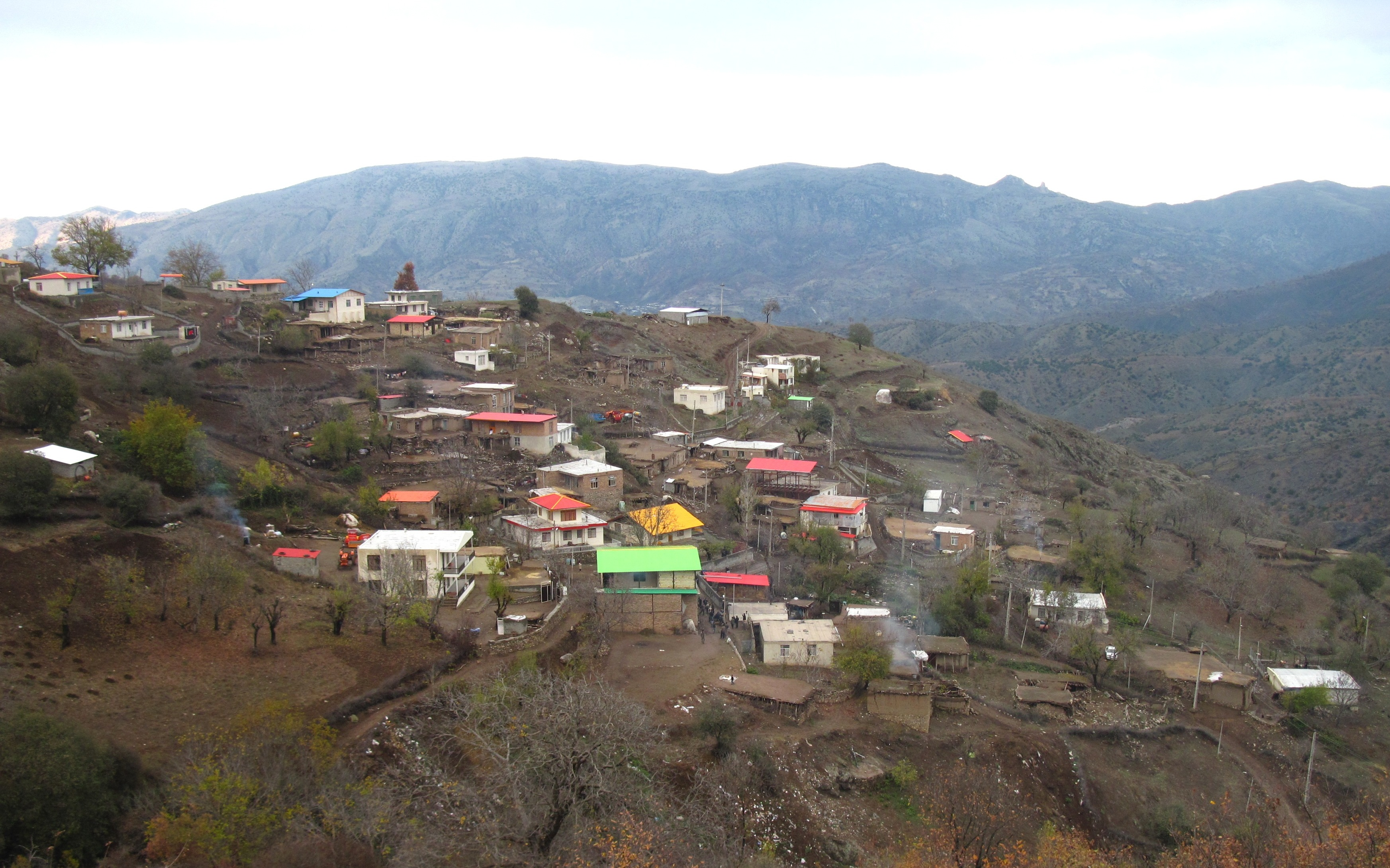
- Alherd in November 2012

- Location within Iran
- Coordinates: 38°55′24″N 46°51′28″E
- Country: Iran
- Province: East Azerbaijan
- County: Khoda Afarin
- Bakhsh: Minjavan
- Rural District: Minjavan-e Gharbi

Population (2006)
  - Total: 81
- Time zone: UTC+3:30 (IRST)
  - Summer (DST): UTC+4:30 (IRDT)

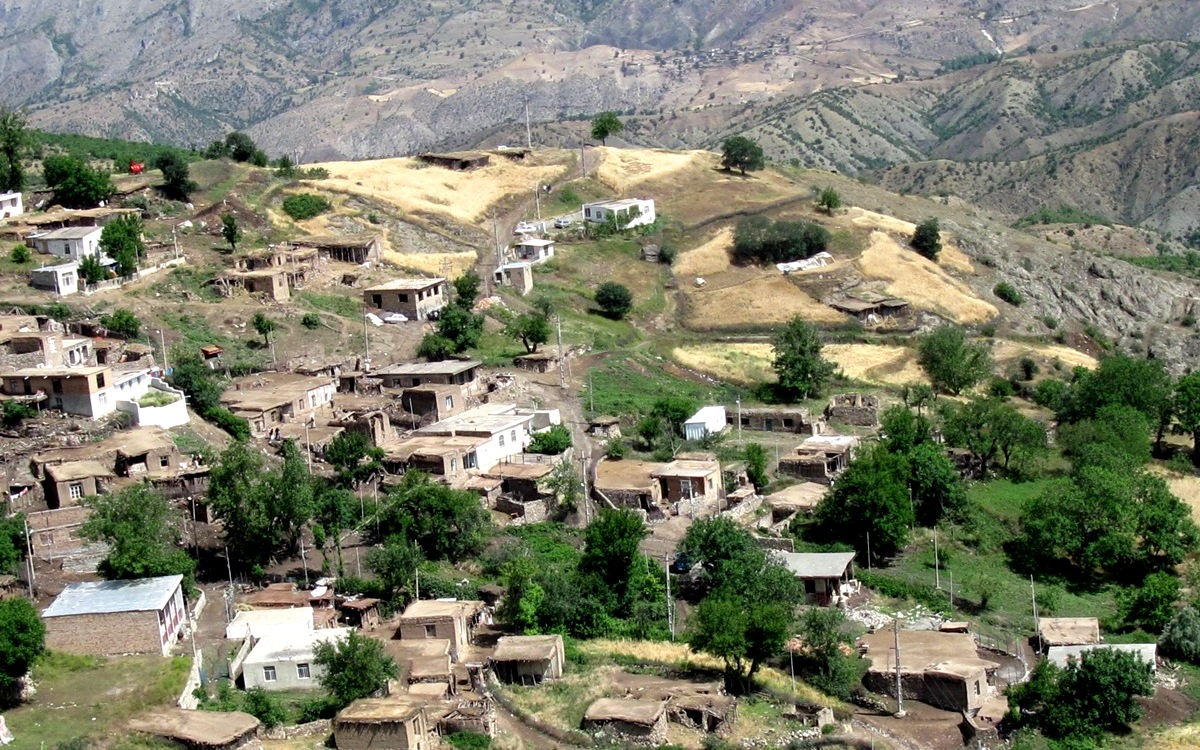
Alherd; June 2009.

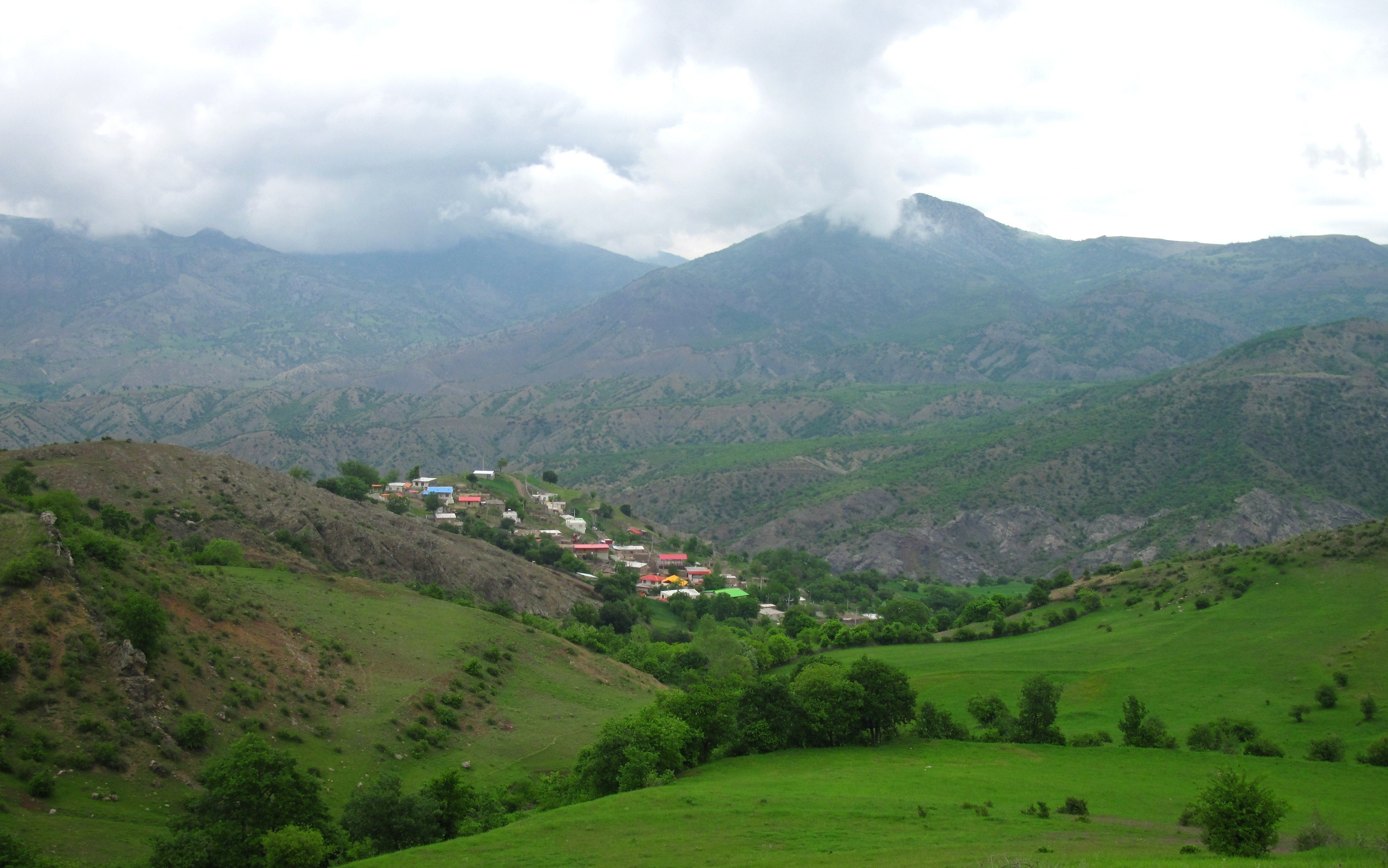
Alherd; May 2013.

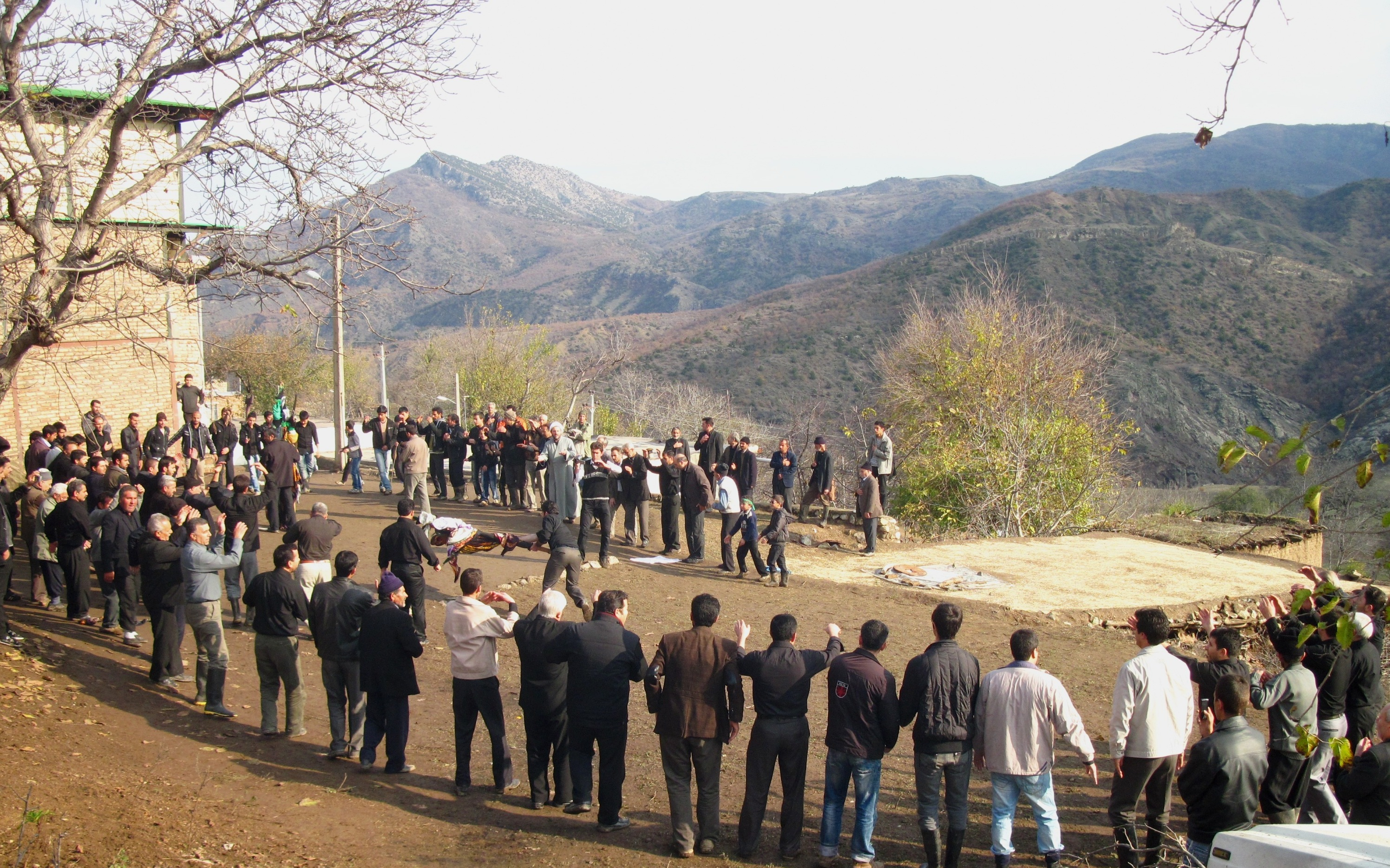
Two toğs as exhibited in an ashura ceremony for commemorating Imam Hossein's martyrdom. (2012)

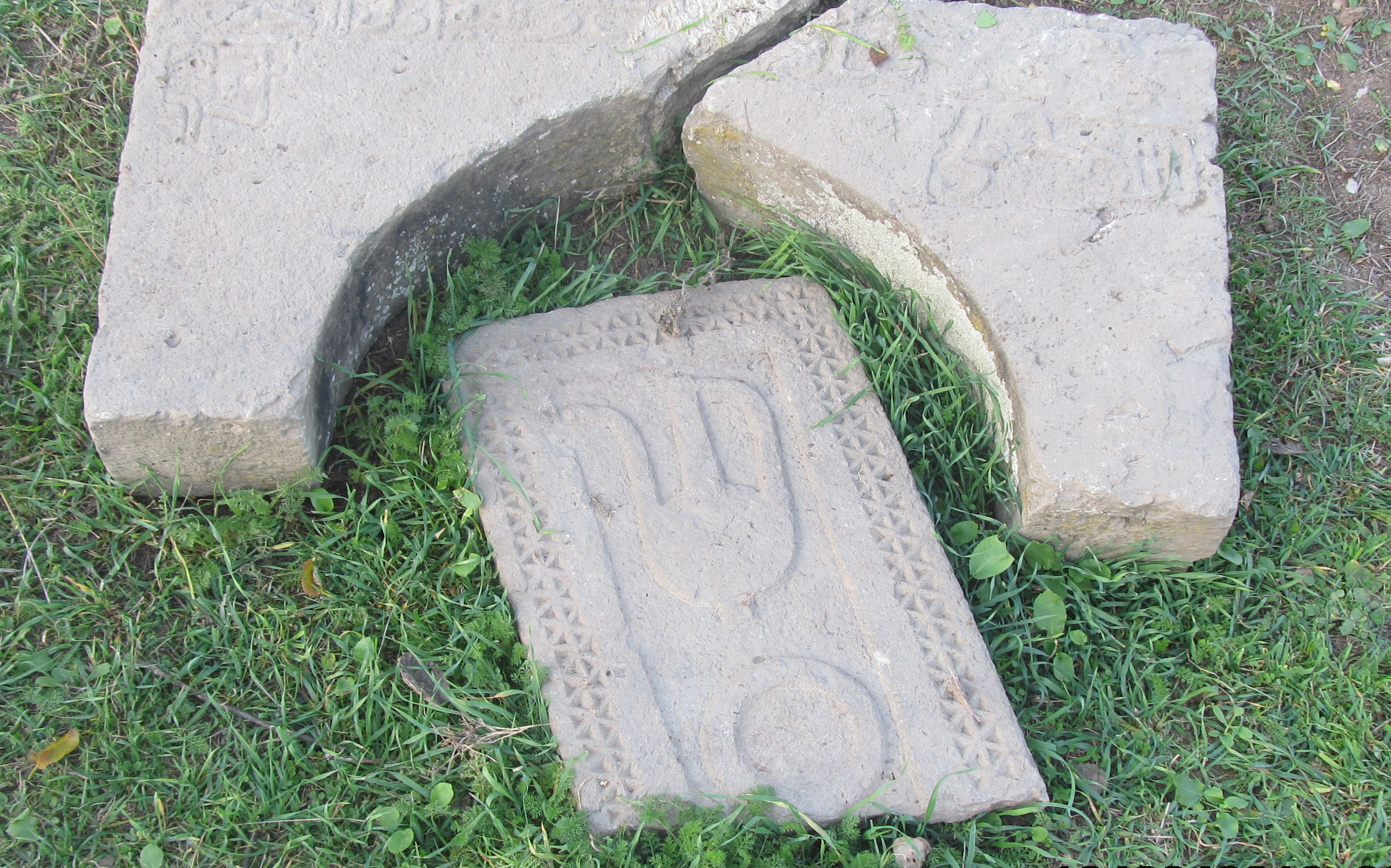
A tombstone in Alherd's ancient graveyard.

Alherd (Persian: الهرد, also Romanized as Alhard and Elehred; also known as Alūr) is a village in Minjavan-e Gharbi Rural District, Minjavan District, Khoda Afarin County, East Azerbaijan Province, Iran. At the 2006 census, its population was 81, in 18 families.

The first modern elementary school of the area was established in Alherd in 1972. About 40 students from Abbasabad, Yusoflu, and Garmanab attended the school. At present only 4 students attend the school and a part-time teacher teaches there for half of every week.

The village may have an ancient history as evidenced by unusually decorated tombstones scattered over its old graveyard. The decoration patterns and their artistic quality is unusual in the whole district.

Alherd's population was in steady decline since the launch of land reform policies in the early 1960s. By 2000 less than ten families still lived in the village. Then, some expatriates returned from Tehran and built summer residences. At present the village is witnessing an unprecedented construction boom, a fact that can be easily noticed by comparing the included photos. According to a more recent and, perhaps, reliable statistics the population is 70 people in 18 families. The increase in the number of households is not indicated in this statistics as the new residents do not consider themselves as villagers. The decline in the population is a reflection of a general trend in Arasbaran region, where due to the lack of jobs younger generation cannot manage a decent living.

Ashura, the 10th day of the lunar month Muharram, is the day at which the mourning celebrations commemorating Imam Husayns' martyrdom reach their climax. In Alherd, there are three Toğs, palm sized metallic icons fixed on a medium-sized wooden handles. According to locals, these icons perform relentless erratic movements at the hands of their carriers (alamdars) until noon during Ashura. In the accompanying photo two persons holding toğ can be seen, who are surrounded by mourners beating on their legs. One toğ is still. It seems that the other toğ is performing erratic motions and is pulling the holder.
