= Moradlu, Khoda Afarin =

Moradlu مرادلو
- Village
- Location within Iran
- Coordinates: 38°57′17″N 46°47′30″E
- Country: Iran
- Province: East Azerbaijan
- County: Khoda Afarin
- Bakhsh: Minjavan
- Rural District: Minjavan-e Gharbi

Population (2006)
  - Total: 33
- Time zone: UTC+3:30 (IRST)
  - Summer (DST): UTC+4:30 (IRDT)

Moradlu (Persian: مرادلو, also Romanized as Morādlū; also known as Ahmadi, Aḩmadlū, and Akhmety) is a village in Minjavan-e Gharbi Rural District, Minjavan District, Khoda Afarin County, East Azerbaijan Province, Iran. At the 2006 census, its population was 33, in 10 families.
