= Ayenehlu =

Ayenehlu اينه لو
- Village
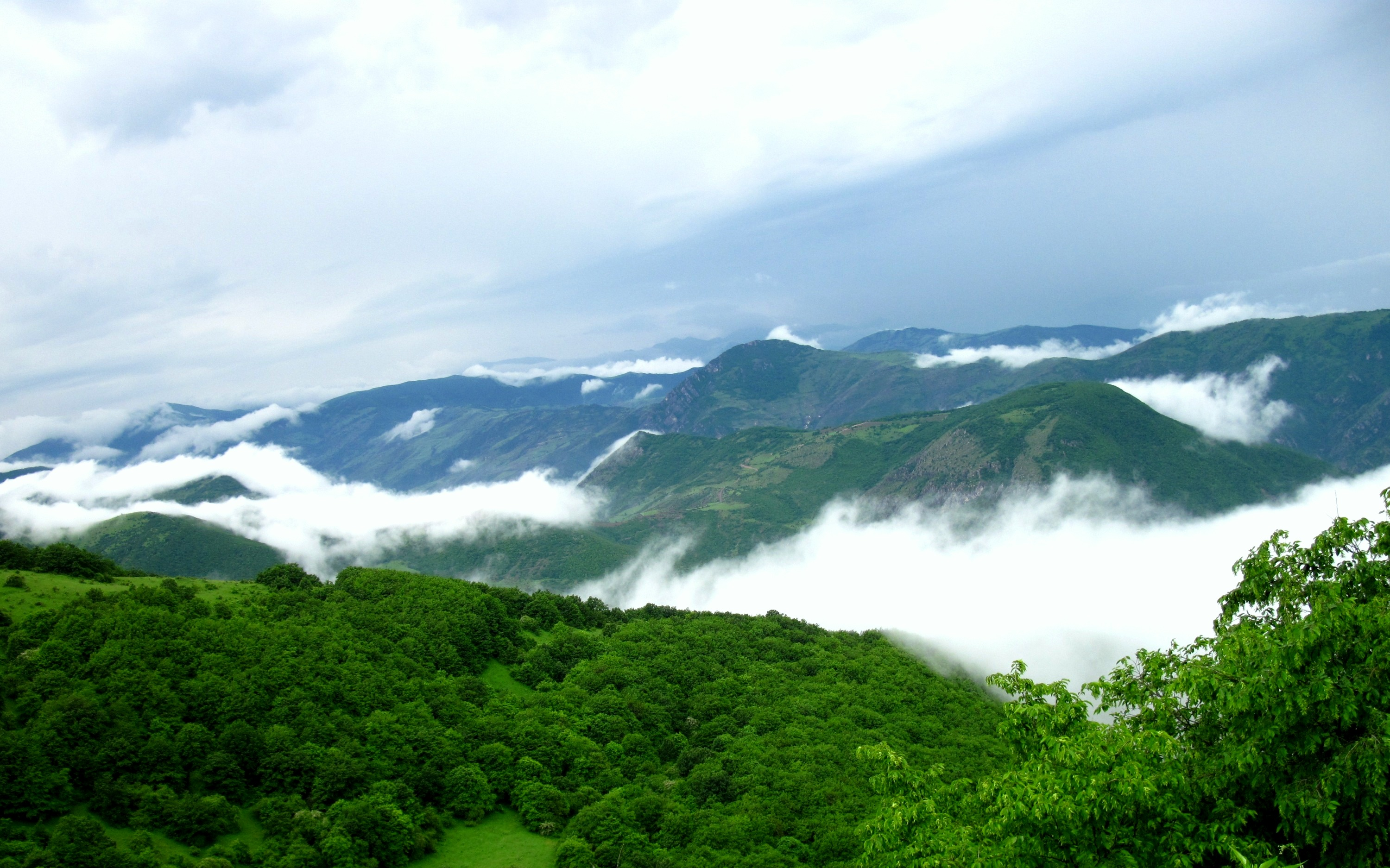
- A view of Ayenelu forests

- Location within Iran
- Coordinates: 38°53′41″N 46°47′10″E
- Country: Iran
- Province: East Azerbaijan
- County: Khoda Afarin
- Bakhsh: Minjavan
- Rural District: Minjavan-e Gharbi

Population (2006)
  - Total: 10
- Time zone: UTC+3:30 (IRST)
  - Summer (DST): UTC+4:30 (IRDT)

Ayenehlu (Persian: اينه لو, also Romanized as Āyenehlū and Ainaloo) is a village in Minjavan-e Gharbi Rural District, Minjavan District, Khoda Afarin County, East Azerbaijan Province, Iran. At the 2006 census, its population was 10, in 4 families.

The village's proximity to the summer camps of Chaparli and Aqdash has made it a prime destination for ecotourism.

At the turn of the nineteenth century, Ayenehlu was one of the 17 villages of Arasbaran where Armenians lived. A wealthy Armenian man built a mansion in 1907, which is known as Qantoor. After World War II the Armenians migrated to Tabriz and Tehran, and the village was populated by Muslims from the surrounding villages. By 1977, the village was abandoned. After the Islamic Revolution some families returned. A national park has been established in the territories of the former village.

The original Ayenehlu village was famous in three respects:

- An iron ore mine which provided an iron processing plant in the nearby Abbasabad village;
- A swamp which harbored leeches used in traditional medicine,
- Mohammad Qoli, known as Anjoman, an impoverished landlord who had wasted his enormous wealth on a Russian trip. His memories from the pleasant journey had become part of folk culture in the region.
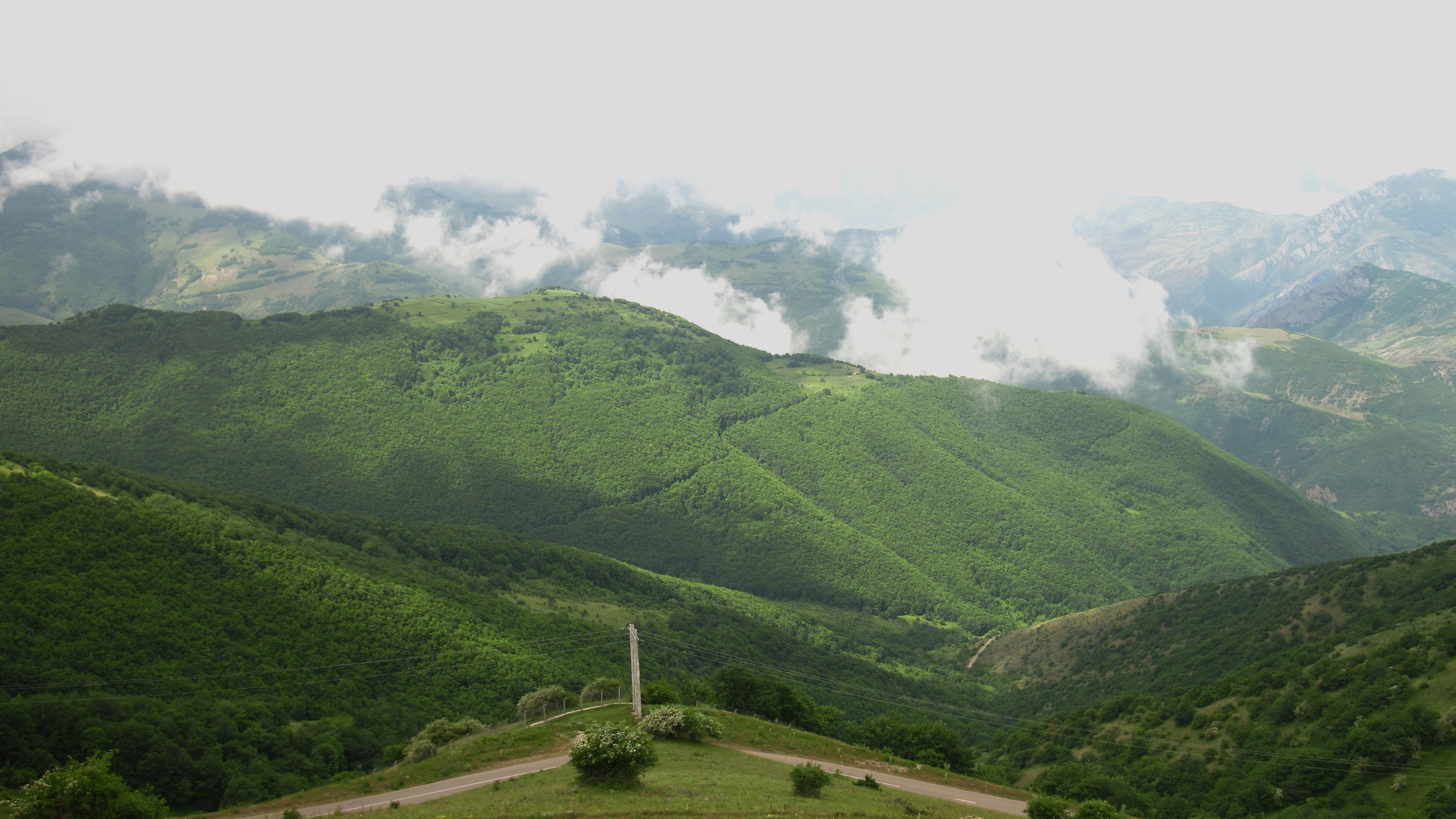
A view of Ayenehlu forests

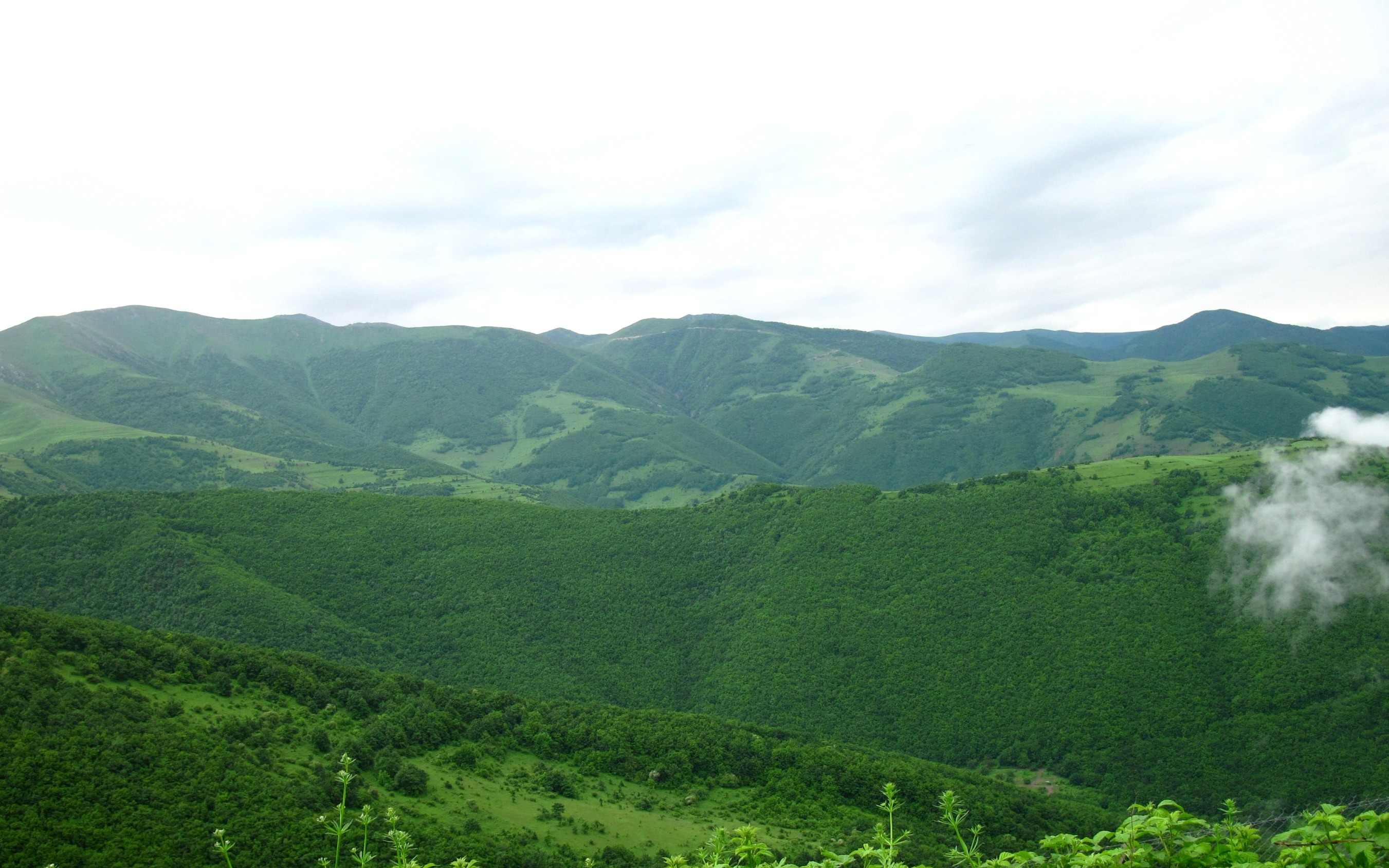
A view of Ayenehlu forests

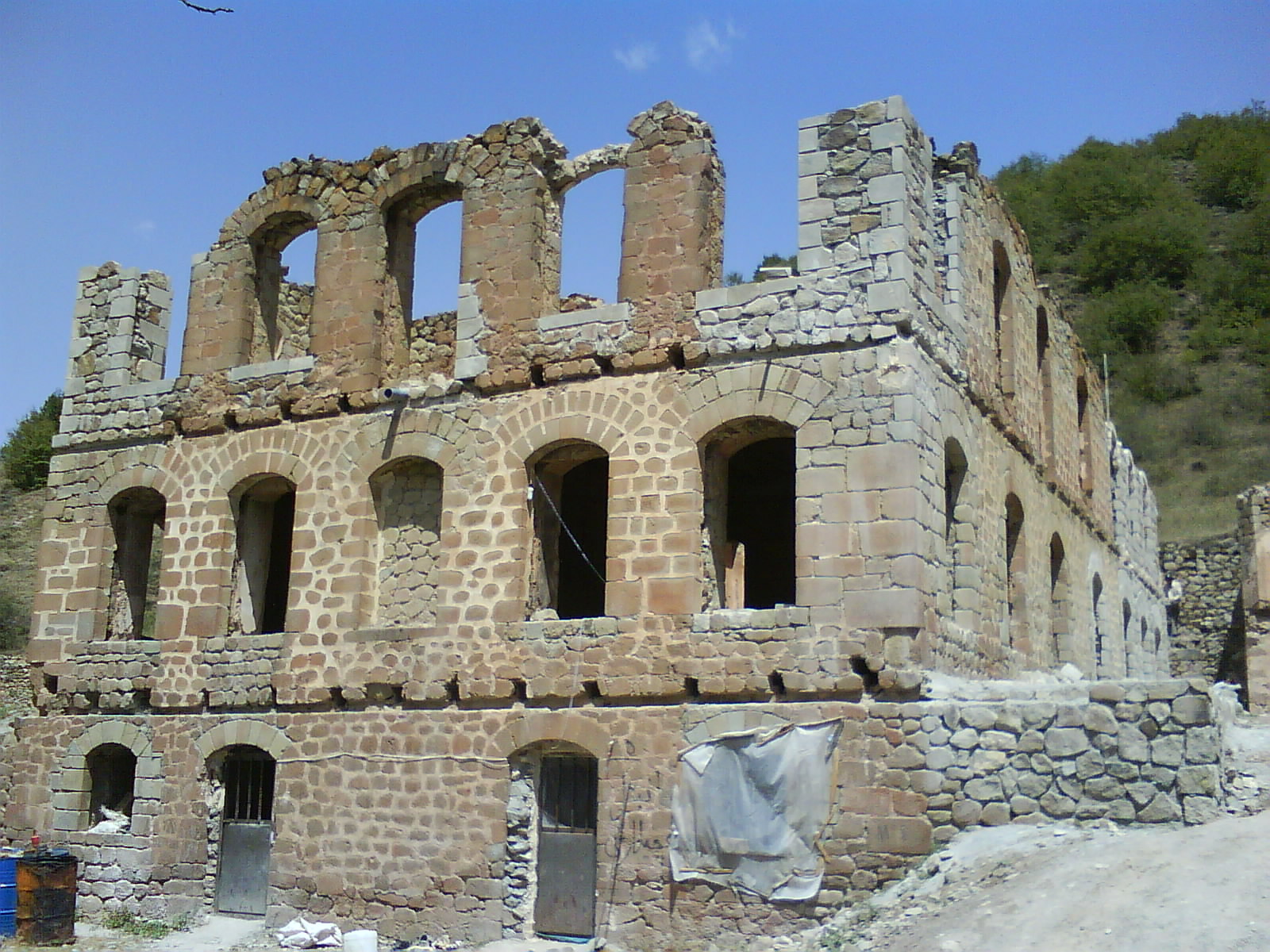
Qantoor; a historical landmark
