= Jafarabad, Khoda Afarin =

Jafarabad جعفرآباد
- village
- Location within Iran
- Coordinates: 39°06′54″N 46°50′46″E
- Country: Iran
- Province: East Azerbaijan
- County: Khoda Afarin
- Bakhsh: Minjavan
- Rural District: Minjavan-e Sharqi

Population (2006)
  - Total: 116
- Time zone: UTC+3:30 (IRST)
  - Summer (DST): UTC+4:30 (IRDT)

Jafarabad (Persian: جعفرآباد, also Romanized as Ja'farābād or Jafar Abad; also known as Pāsgāh-e Ja'farābād) was a village in Minjavan-e Sharqi Rural District, Minjavan District, Khoda Afarin County, East Azerbaijan Province, Iran. At the 2006 census, its population was 116, in 27 families.

The land it occupied was submerged following the construction of the Khoda Afarin Dam.

The village was located in an area of archaeological importance due to the presence of numerous Kurgans.
