= Razin, Khoda Afarin =

Razin رزين
- Village
- Location within Iran
- Coordinates: 38°52′18″N 46°42′34″E
- Country: Iran
- Province: East Azerbaijan
- County: Khoda Afarin
- Bakhsh: Minjavan
- Rural District: Minjavan-e Gharbi

Population (2006)
  - Total: 50
- Time zone: UTC+3:30 (IRST)
  - Summer (DST): UTC+4:30 (IRDT)

Razin (Persian: رزين, also Romanized as Razīn; also known as Arazīn, Arzīn, and Barāzīn) is a village in Minjavan-e Gharbi Rural District, Minjavan District, Khoda Afarin County, East Azerbaijan Province, Iran. At the 2006 census, its population was 50, in 9 families.
