= Piranlu, Razavi Khorasan =

Piranlu پيرانلو
- Village
- Location within Iran
- Coordinates: 37°12′33″N 58°42′12″E
- Country: Iran
- Province: Razavi Khorasan
- County: Quchan
- Bakhsh: Central
- Rural District: Shirin Darreh

Population (2006)
  - Total: 214
- Time zone: UTC+3:30 (IRST)
  - Summer (DST): UTC+4:30 (IRDT)

Piranlu (Persian: پيرانلو, also Romanized as Pīrānlū) is a village in Shirin Darreh Rural District, in the Central District of Quchan County, Razavi Khorasan Province, Iran. At the 2006 census, its population was 214, in 47 families.
