= Chay Kandi, Khoda Afarin =

Chay Kandi چاي كندي
- Village
- Location within Iran
- Coordinates: 38°47′25″N 46°33′48″E
- Country: Iran
- Province: East Azerbaijan
- County: Khoda Afarin
- Bakhsh: Minjavan
- Rural District: Dizmar-e Sharqi

Population (2006)
  - Total: 19
- Time zone: UTC+3:30 (IRST)
  - Summer (DST): UTC+4:30 (IRDT)

Chay Kandi (Persian: چاي كندي, also Romanized as Chāy Kandī; also known as Chāikhāna, Chaykendy, and Chāykhāneh) is a village in Dizmar-e Sharqi Rural District, Minjavan District, Khoda Afarin County, East Azerbaijan Province, Iran. At the 2006 census, its population was 19, in 7 families.
