= Khomarlu =

City in East Azerbaijan province, Iran

Khomarlu Persian: خمارلو
- City
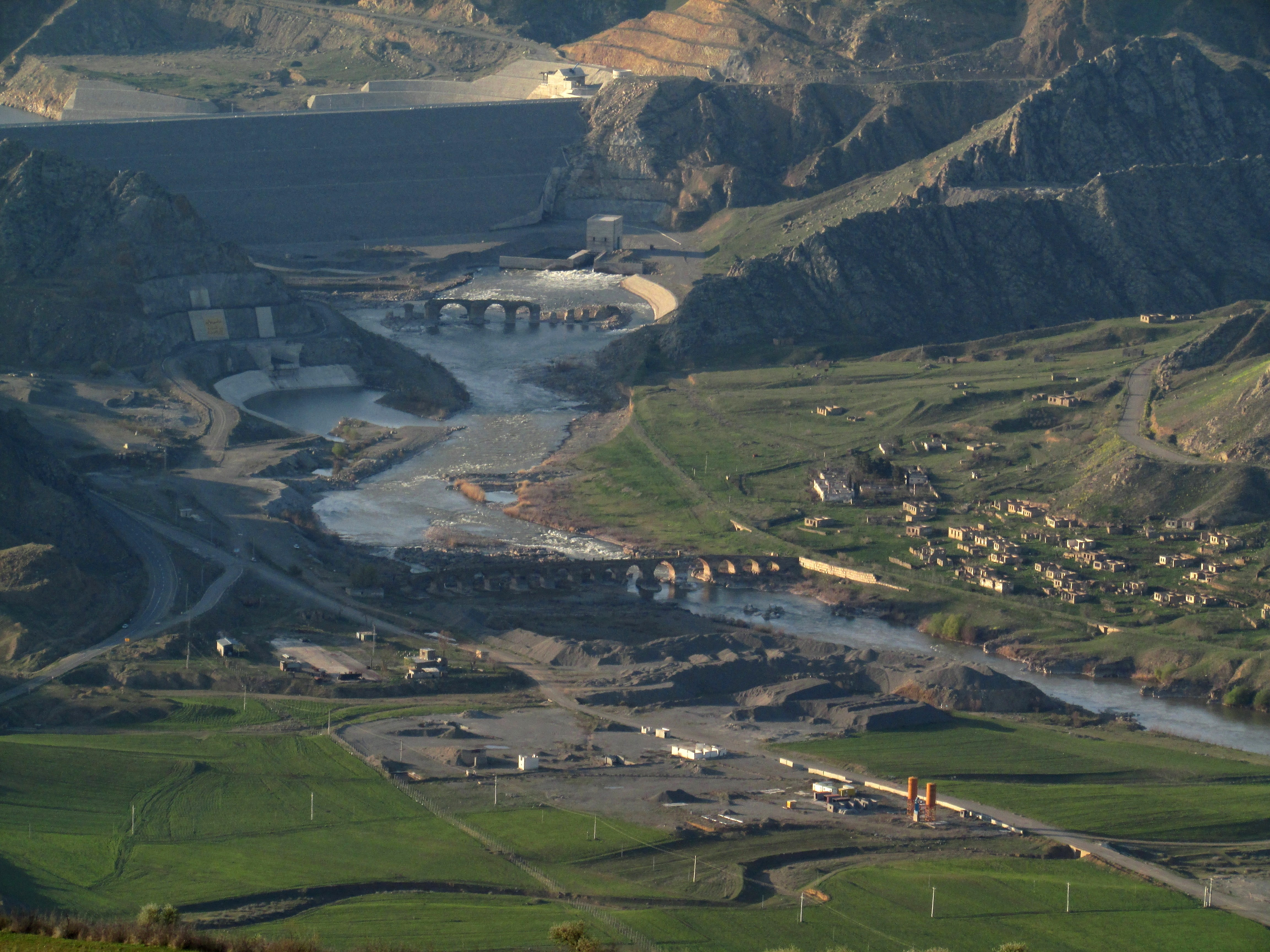
- Khoda Afarin Bridges in the background of Khoda Afarin dam

- Location within Iran
- Coordinates: 39°09′33″N 47°01′58″E
- Country: Iran
- Province: East Azerbaijan
- County: Khoda Afarin
- District: Central
- Established as a city: 1998

Population (2016)
  - Total: 1,902
- Time zone: UTC+3:30 (IRST)

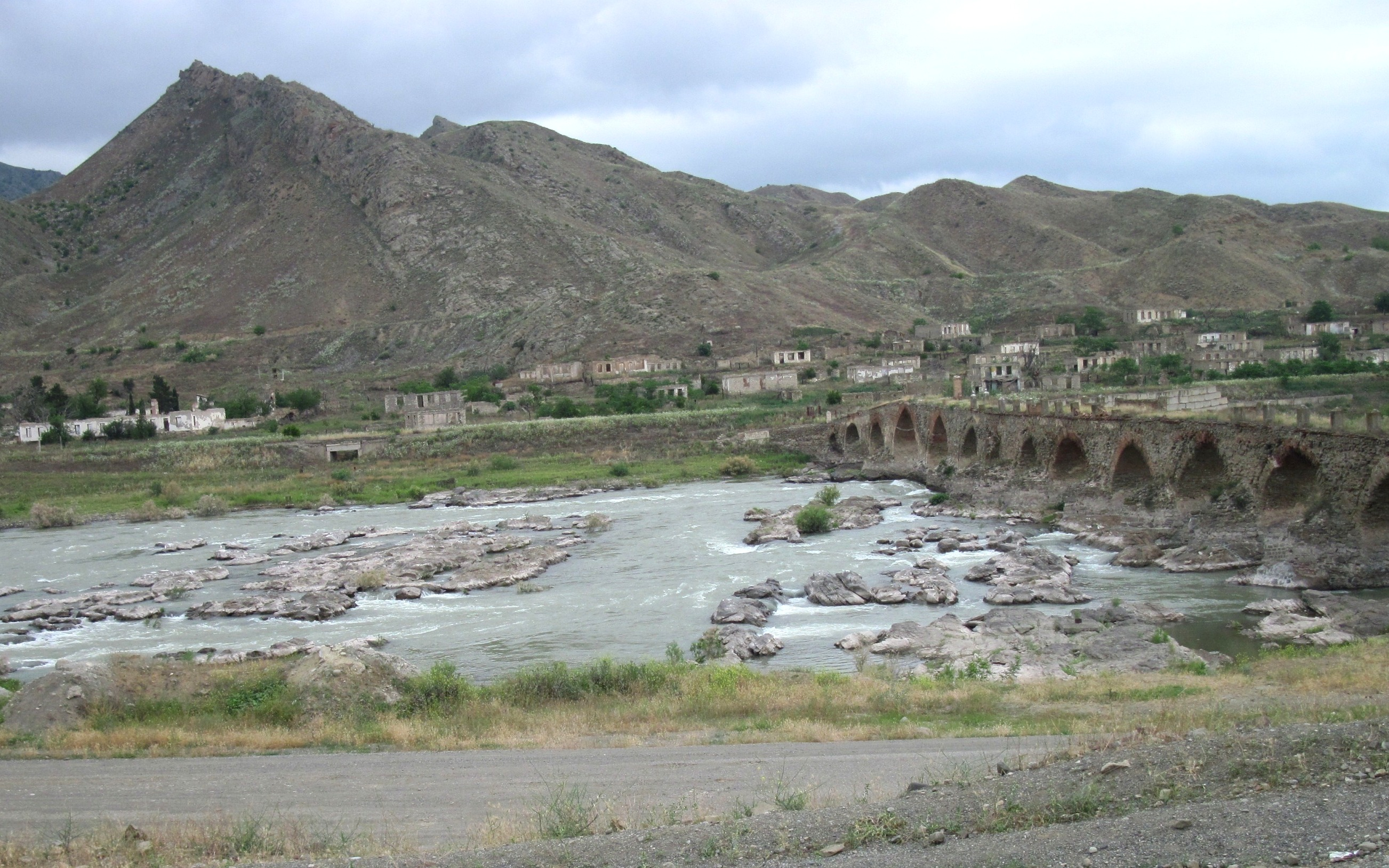
One of the two Khoda Afarin bridges

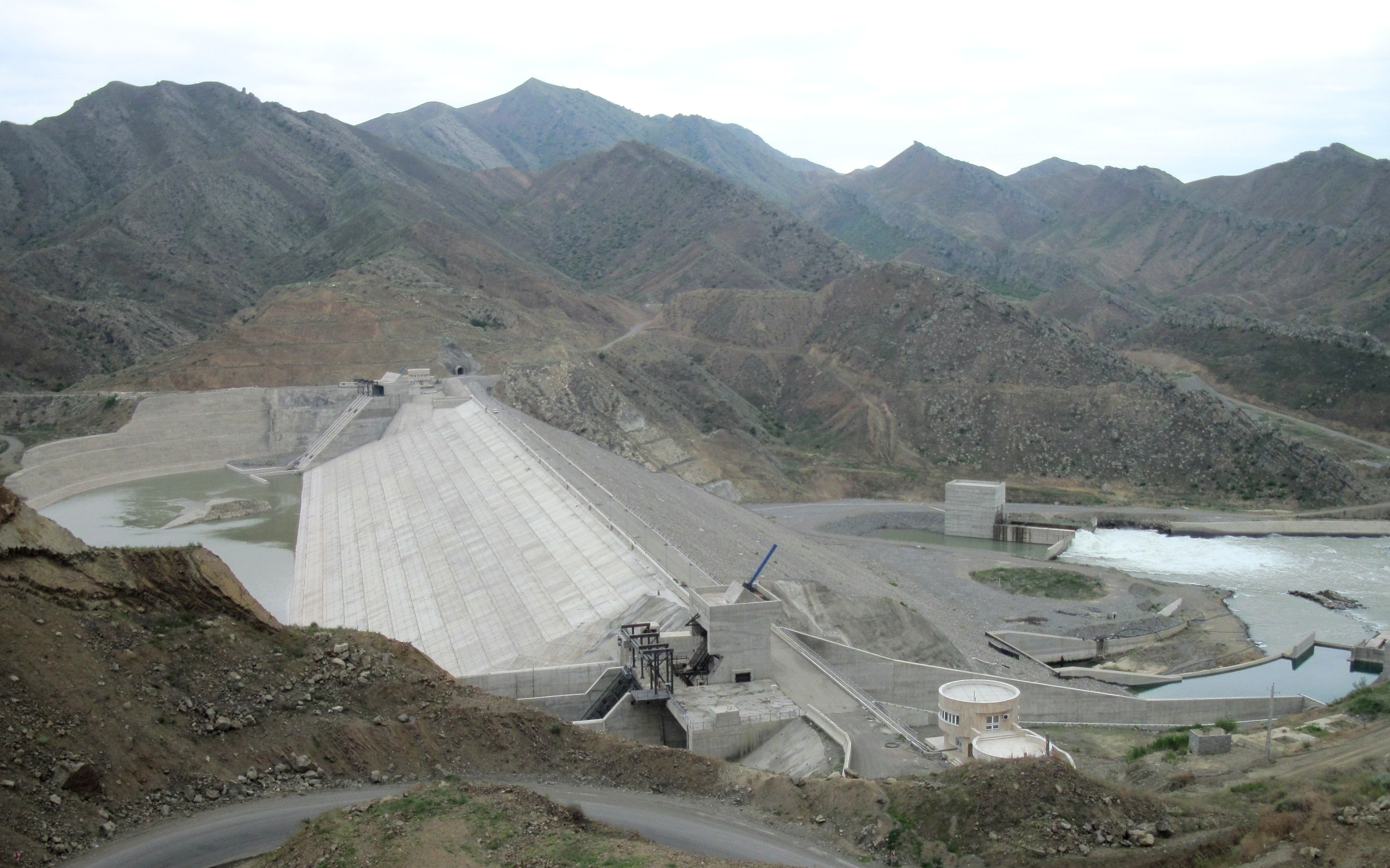
Khoda Afarin Dam at the final phase of construction

Khomarlu (Persian: خمارلو) (Note: Also romanized as Khomārlū) is a city in the Central District of Khoda Afarin County, East Azerbaijan province, Iran, serving as capital of both the county and the district. The city also serves as the administrative center for Keyvan Rural District. The village of Khomarlu was converted to a city in 1998.

== Demographics ==
=== Population ===
At the time of the 2006 National Census, the city's population was 1,222 in 334 households, when it was capital of the former Khoda Afarin District in Kaleybar County. The following census in 2011 counted 1,659 people in 474 households, by which time the district had been separated from the county in the establishment of Khoda Afarin County. The city and the rural district were transferred to the new Central District, with Khomarlu as the county's capital. The 2016 census measured the population of the city as 1,902 people in 560 households.

== Overview ==
The first reference to Khomarlu in the published literature, is the following description by Robert Mignan, "..the village of Khomorloo, situated upon a deep ravine, between steep calcareous and barren mountains. The dwellings of the villagers were scooped from the sides of a mountain, which formed three sides of each hut, the fourth being a wall of mud, in which an aperture of four feet square was left, and a few miserable planks tied together served for the door: the whole covered over by rafters, and a thin coating of flat thatch. They had the character of being plunderers and assassins, but excused their depredations by pretending that the whole country were at war with them. Had we not been with the prince, we dared not have trusted to their hospitality. They appeared the poorest people we had yet seen. Both sexes were clad in rags, and the children to the age of seven were tous nude. They possessed a few sheep and goats, and a good supply of grapes, which they had preserved all the winter...".

The online edition of the Dehkhoda Dictionary, quoting Iranian Army files, reports a population of 396 people in late 1940s. The village was infamous for having a branch of Royal Gendarme, which was tasked with conscripting soldiers. In the wake of White Revolution (early 1960s) a clan of Mohammad Khanlu tribe, comprising 60 households, used Khomarlu as their winter quarters.

Just after the revolution, revolutionary institutions, such as Friday Prayer office, were set office in the village. In 1988 the notary branch of the district moved from Abbasabad to Khomarlu and added to the importance of the village. In 1999, Khomarlu was declared a town by the decree of central government. The construction of Khoda Afarin Dam in the vicinity of the village was a turning point in the development of the village and transforming it to a town.

The most important landmark near the town is a pair of historical bridges, known as Khoda Afarin Bridges. One bridge is in ruins but the other with a length of 160 m is still usable by pedestrians.
