= Khaneqah, Khoda Afarin =

Khaneqah خانقاه
- Village
- Location within Iran
- Coordinates: 38°50′44″N 46°37′05″E
- Country: Iran
- Province: East Azerbaijan
- County: Khoda Afarin
- Bakhsh: Minjavan
- Rural District: Dizmar-e Sharqi

Population (2006)
  - Total: 90
- Time zone: UTC+3:30 (IRST)
  - Summer (DST): UTC+4:30 (IRDT)

Khaneqah (Persian: خانقاه, also Romanized as Khāneqāh and Khānaqāh; also known as Khanachev, Khaneghah Dezmar, Khoinarev, and Khownāreh; in Armenian: Խանակեահ) is a village in Dizmar-e Sharqi Rural District, Minjavan District, Khoda Afarin County, East Azerbaijan Province, Iran. At the 2006 census, its population was 90, in 16 families. The village is populated by the Kurdish Mohammad Khanlu tribe.
