= Lalahluy-e Torab =

Lalahluy-e Torab لله لوي تراب
- Village
- Location within Iran
- Coordinates: 37°44′37″N 45°09′23″E
- Country: Iran
- Province: West Azerbaijan
- County: Urmia
- Bakhsh: Nazlu
- Rural District: Nazlu-e Shomali

Population (2006)
  - Total: 295
- Time zone: UTC+3:30 (IRST)
  - Summer (DST): UTC+4:30 (IRDT)

Lalahluy-e Torab (Persian: لله لوي تراب, also Romanized as Lalahlūy-e Torāb; also known as Lalahlū-ye Torāb, Lalalū-ye Ātlū Khān, and Lalaryelūy-e Torāb) is a village in Nazlu-e Shomali Rural District, Nazlu District, Urmia County, West Azerbaijan Province, Iran. At the 2006 census, its population was 295, in 77 families.
