= Yusoflu, Khoda Afarin =

Yusoflu يوسفلو
- Village
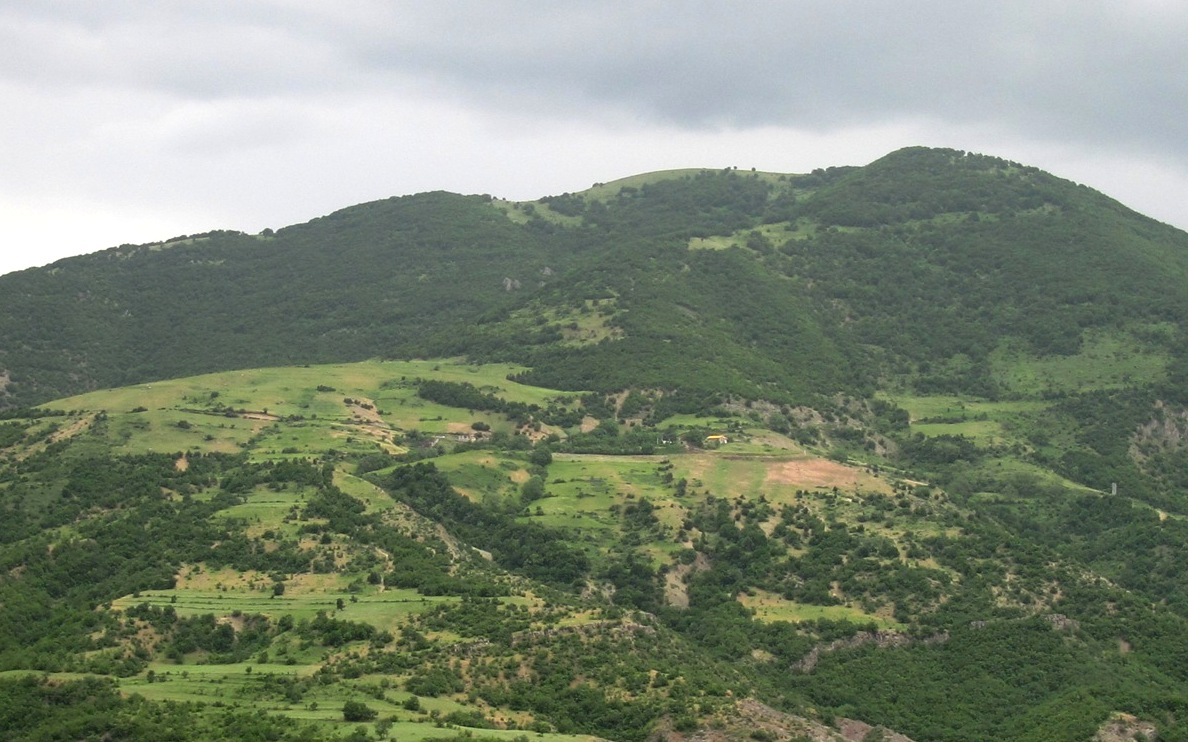
- A distant view of Yusoflu in 2009.

- Location within Iran
- Coordinates: 38°55′02″N 46°51′37″E
- Country: Iran
- Province: East Azerbaijan
- County: Khoda Afarin
- Bakhsh: Minjavan
- Rural District: Minjavan-e Gharbi

Population (2006)
  - Total: 40
- Time zone: UTC+3:30 (IRST)
  - Summer (DST): UTC+4:30 (IRDT)

Yusoflu (Persian: يوسفلو, also Romanized as Yūsoflū; also known as Yusupli) is a village in Minjavan-e Gharbi Rural District, Minjavan District, Khoda Afarin County, East Azerbaijan Province, Iran. At the 2006 census, its population was 40, in 8 families. According to a more recent and, perhaps, reliable statistics the population is 26 people in 6 families.

== Notable people ==
The second generation of immigrants from Yusoflu have achieved significant success in national level. A brief list is the following:

- Yousef Ali Abbasabad, a prolific scholar and writer
- Arsalan Fathipor, chairman of the economic commission in the Iranian Parliament
- Houssein Rezapour, a poet with the pen name "Razi"
- Prof. Shahram Rezapour, a young internationally recognized mathematician
- Yaqoob Rezapour, ophthalmologist
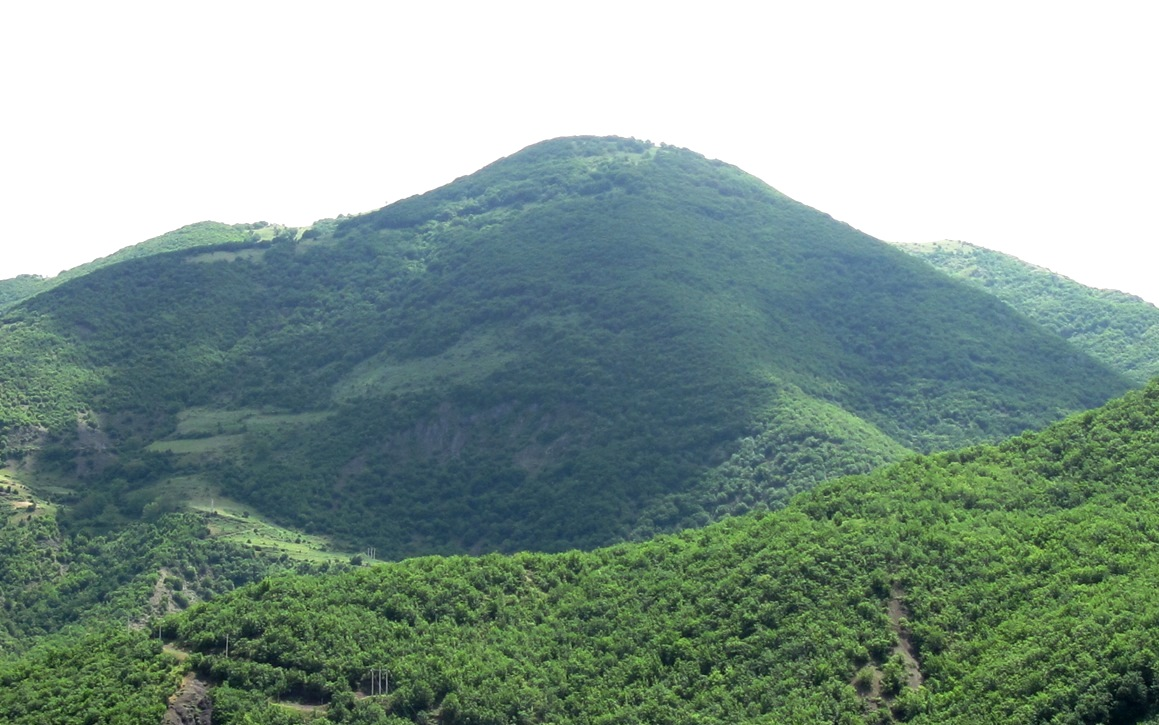
Forests around the village
