= Keyvan Rural District =

Rural district in East Azerbaijan province, Iran

Keyvan Rural District Persian: دهستان كيوان
- Rural District
- Location within Iran
- Coordinates: 39°05′N 47°01′E
- Country: Iran
- Province: East Azerbaijan
- County: Khoda Afarin
- District: Central
- Established: 1987
- Capital: Khomarlu

Population (2016)
  - Total: 2,068
- Time zone: UTC+3:30 (IRST)

Keyvan Rural District (Persian: دهستان كيوان) (Note: Armenian: Քէյվան Գաւառակ)) is in the Central District of Khoda Afarin County, East Azerbaijan province, Iran. It is administered from the city of Khomarlu.

== Demographics ==
=== Population ===
At the time of the 2006 National Census, the rural district's population (as a part of the former Khoda Afarin District in Kaleybar County) was 2,905 in 682 households. There were 2,423 inhabitants in 692 households at the following census of 2011, by which time the district had been separated from the county in the establishment of Khoda Afarin County. The rural district was transferred to the new Central District. The 2016 census measured the population of the rural district as 2,068 in 698 households. The most populous of its 35 villages was Zanbalan, with 330 people.

=== Other villages in the rural district ===
- Chenaqchi
- Hamadan
- Qezel Yul
- Safarlu
