= Khoda Afarin District =

Former district in East Azerbaijan province, Iran

Khoda Afarin District Persian: بخش خداآفرین
- Former District
- Location within Iran
- Coordinates: 39°05′N 46°56′E
- Country: Iran
- Province: East Azerbaijan
- County: Kaleybar
- Established: 1989
- Capital: Khomarlu

Population (2006)
  - Total: 34,461
- Time zone: UTC+3:30 (IRST)

Khoda Afarin District (Persian: بخش خداآفرین) is a former administrative division of Kaleybar County, East Azerbaijan province, Iran. Its capital was the city of Khomarlu.

== History ==
In 2010, the district was separated from the county in the establishment of Khoda Afarin County.

== Demographics ==
=== Population ===
At the time of the 2006 National Census, the district's population was 34,461 in 7,492 households.

=== Administrative divisions ===
Khoda Afarin District Population
Administrative Divisions	2006
Bastamlu RD	5,907
Dizmar-e Sharqi RD	2,888
Garamduz RD (Note: Renamed Garamduz-e Gharbi Rural District)	11,434
Keyvan RD	2,905
Minjavan-e Gharbi RD	4,378
Minjavan-e Sharqi RD	5,727
Khomarlu (city)	1,222
Total	34,461
RD = Rural District
