= Garamduz-e Gharbi Rural District =

Rural district in East Azerbaijan province, Iran

Garamduz-e Gharbi Rural District Persian: دهستان گرمادوز غربي
- Rural District
- Location within Iran
- Coordinates: 39°17′N 47°13′E
- Country: Iran
- Province: East Azerbaijan
- County: Khoda Afarin
- District: Garamduz
- Established: 1987
- Capital: Larijan

Population (2016)
  - Total: 8,308
- Time zone: UTC+3:30 (IRST)

Garamduz-e Gharbi Rural District (Persian: دهستان گرمادوز غربي) (Note: Formerly Garamduz Rural District (دهستان گرمادوز)) is in Garamduz District of Khoda Afarin County, East Azerbaijan province, Iran. Its capital is the village of Larijan.

== Demographics ==
=== Population ===
At the time of the 2006 National Census, the rural district's population (as Garamduz Rural District (Note: Renamed Garamduz-e Gharbi Rural District) of the former Khoda Afarin District in Kaleybar County) was 11,434 in 2,360 households. There were 8,826 inhabitants in 2,291 households at the following census of 2011, by which time the district had been separated from the county in the establishment of Khoda Afarin County. The rural district was transferred to the new Garamduz District and renamed Garamduz-e Gharbi Rural District. The 2016 census measured the population of the rural district as 8,308 in 2,503 households. The most populous of its 26 villages was Larijan, with 1,094 people.

=== Other villages in the rural district ===
- Gun Gowrmez
- Hasratan
- Jafar Qoli Owshaghi
- Qarlujeh
- Qeshlaq-e Owzbak
- Sharfeh
