= Central District (Khoda Afarin County) =

District in East Azerbaijan province, Iran

Central District (Khoda Afarin County) Persian: بخش مرکزی شهرستان خداآفرين
- District
- Location within Iran
- Coordinates: 39°07′N 47°04′E
- Country: Iran
- Province: East Azerbaijan
- County: Khoda Afarin
- Established: 2010
- Capital: Khomarlu

Population (2016)
  - Total: 8,531
- Time zone: UTC+3:30 (IRST)

The Central District of Khoda Afarin County (Persian: بخش مرکزی شهرستان خداآفرين) is in East Azerbaijan province, Iran. Its capital is the city of Khomarlu.

== History ==
In 2010, Khoda Afarin District was separated from Kaleybar County in the establishment of Khoda Afarin County, which was divided into three districts and seven rural districts, with Khomarlu as its capital and only city at the time.

== Demographics ==
=== Population ===
At the time of the 2011 census, the district's population was 9,489 people in 2,495 households. The 2016 census measured the population of the district as 8,531 inhabitants in 2,617 households.

=== Administrative divisions ===
Central District (Khoda Afarin County) Population
| Administrative Divisions | 2011 | 2016 |
|---|---|---|
| Bastamlu RD | 5,407 | 4,561 |
| Keyvan RD | 2,423 | 2,068 |
| Khomarlu (city) | 1,659 | 1,902 |
| Total | 9,489 | 8,531 |
RD = Rural District
