= Garamduz District =

District in East Azerbaijan province, Iran

Garamduz District Persian: بخش گرمادوز
- District
- Location within Iran
- Coordinates: 39°19′N 47°19′E
- Country: Iran
- Province: East Azerbaijan
- County: Khoda Afarin
- Established: 2010
- Capital: Larijan

Population (2016)
  - Total: 12,544
- Time zone: UTC+3:30 (IRST)

Garamduz District (Persian: بخش گرمادوز) is in Khoda Afarin County, East Azerbaijan province, Iran. Its capital is the village of Larijan.

== History ==
In 2010, Khoda Afarin District was separated from Kaleybar County in the establishment of Khoda Afarin County, which was divided into three districts and seven rural districts, with Khomarlu as its capital and only city at the time.

== Demographics ==
=== Population ===
At the time of the 2011 census, the district's population was 12,964 people in 3,312 households. The 2016 census measured the population of the district as 12,544 inhabitants in 3,715 households.

=== Administrative divisions ===
Garamduz District Population
Administrative Divisions	2011	2016
Garamduz-e Gharbi RD (Note: Formerly Garamduz Rural District)	8,826	8,308
Garamduz-e Sharqi RD	4,138	4,236
Total	12,964	12,544
RD = Rural District
