= Khoda Afarin County =

County in East Azerbaijan province, Iran

Khoda Afarin County Persian: شهرستان خداآفرین
- County
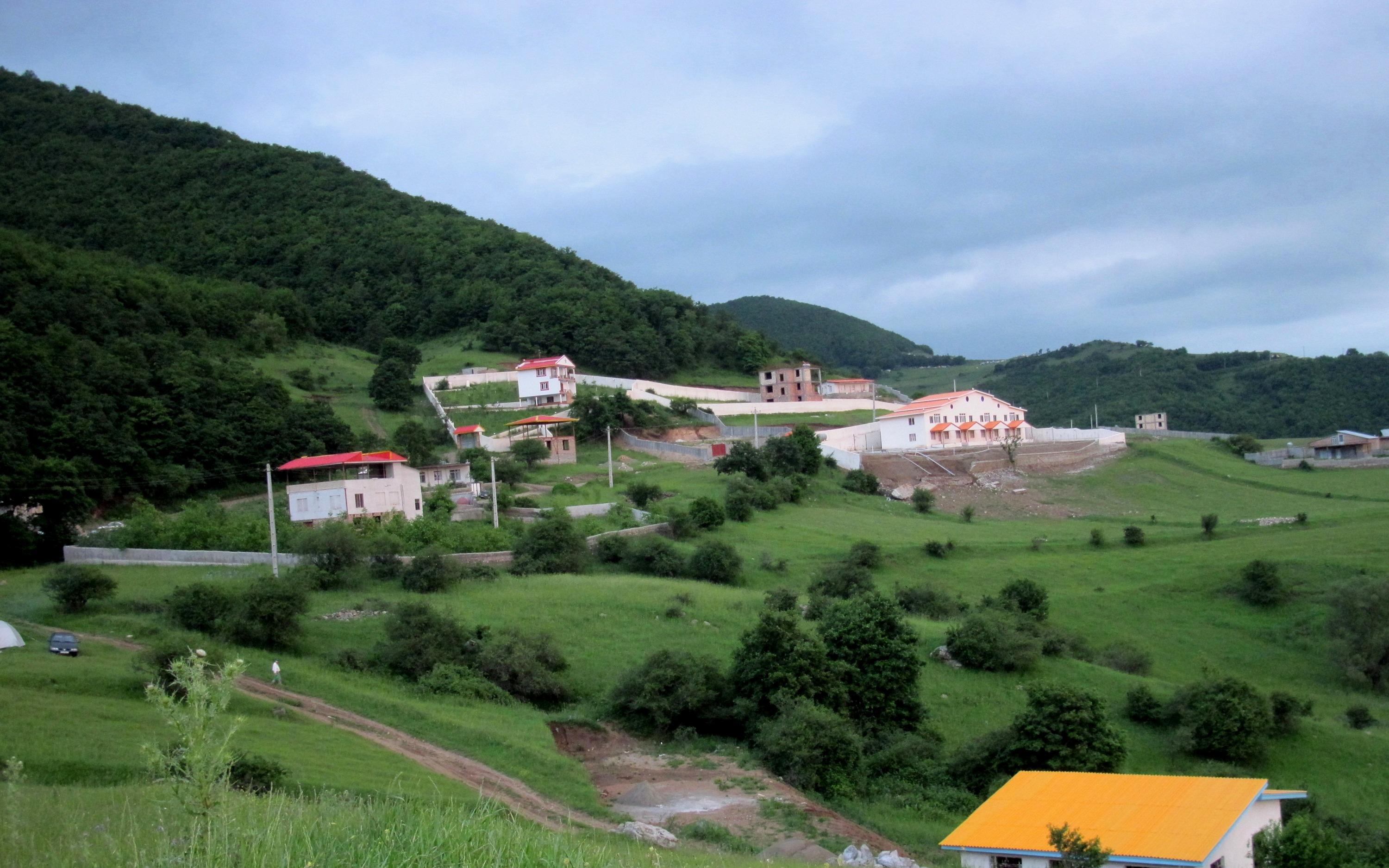
- Construction boom in previously abandoned villages

- Location of Khoda Afarin County in East Azerbaijan province (top, yellow)

- Location of East Azerbaijan province in Iran
- Coordinates: 39°05′N 46°56′E
- Country: Iran
- Province: East Azerbaijan
- Established: 2010
- Capital: Khomarlu
- Districts: Central, Garamduz, Manjavan

Population (2016)
  - Total: 32,995
- Time zone: UTC+3:30 (IRST)

Khoda Afarin County (Persian: شهرستان خداآفرین) is in East Azerbaijan province, Iran. Its capital is the city of Khomarlu.

== History ==
Before the Islamic Revolution, the city of Khomarlu was merely a village that was distinguished from other villages for housing the headquarters of Royal Gendarmery. The notary office was located in Abbasabad village and operated by a cleric, who also acted as the spiritual authority of the whole district.

In 2010, Khoda Afarin District was separated from Kaleybar County in the establishment of Khoda Afarin County, which was divided into three districts and seven rural districts, with Khomarlu as its capital and only city at the time.

== Demographics ==
=== Language ===
The spoken language of a vast majority of the inhabitants is modern Azeri Turkish, which has much similarity to Turkmeni, Afshar and the Anatolian Turkish.

The ancient Indo-European, Iranic language of the province before its turkification, survives in the Tati language, particularly in its Karingani dialect. In addition to the large village of Karingan, the villages of Chay Kandi, Kalasor, Khoynarood, and Arazin also are the last speakers of the old native language of Azerbaijan.

The mountainous terrain, shepherding and cultivation of hillsides possess the isolating features for the development of a sophisticated whistled language. The inhabitants of the region employ the fingered whistle format for long range communication.

=== Population ===
At the time of the 2011 census, the county's population was 34,977 people in 9,169 households. The 2016 census measured the population of the county as 32,995 in 10,196 households.

=== Administrative divisions ===
Khoda Afarin County's population history and administrative structure over two consecutive censuses are shown in the following table.

Khoda Afarin County Population
Administrative Divisions	2011	2016
Central District	9,489	8,531
Bastamlu RD	5,407	4,561
Keyvan RD	2,423	2,068
Khomarlu (city)	1,659	1,902
Garamduz District	12,964	12,544
Garamduz-e Gharbi RD (Note: Formerly Garamduz Rural District)	8,826	8,308
Garamduz-e Sharqi RD	4,138	4,236
Manjavan District	12,524	11,920
Dizmar-e Sharqi RD	3,097	2,760
Manjavan-e Gharbi RD	4,214	4,094
Manjavan-e Sharqi RD	5,213	5,066
Total	34,977	32,995
RD = Rural District

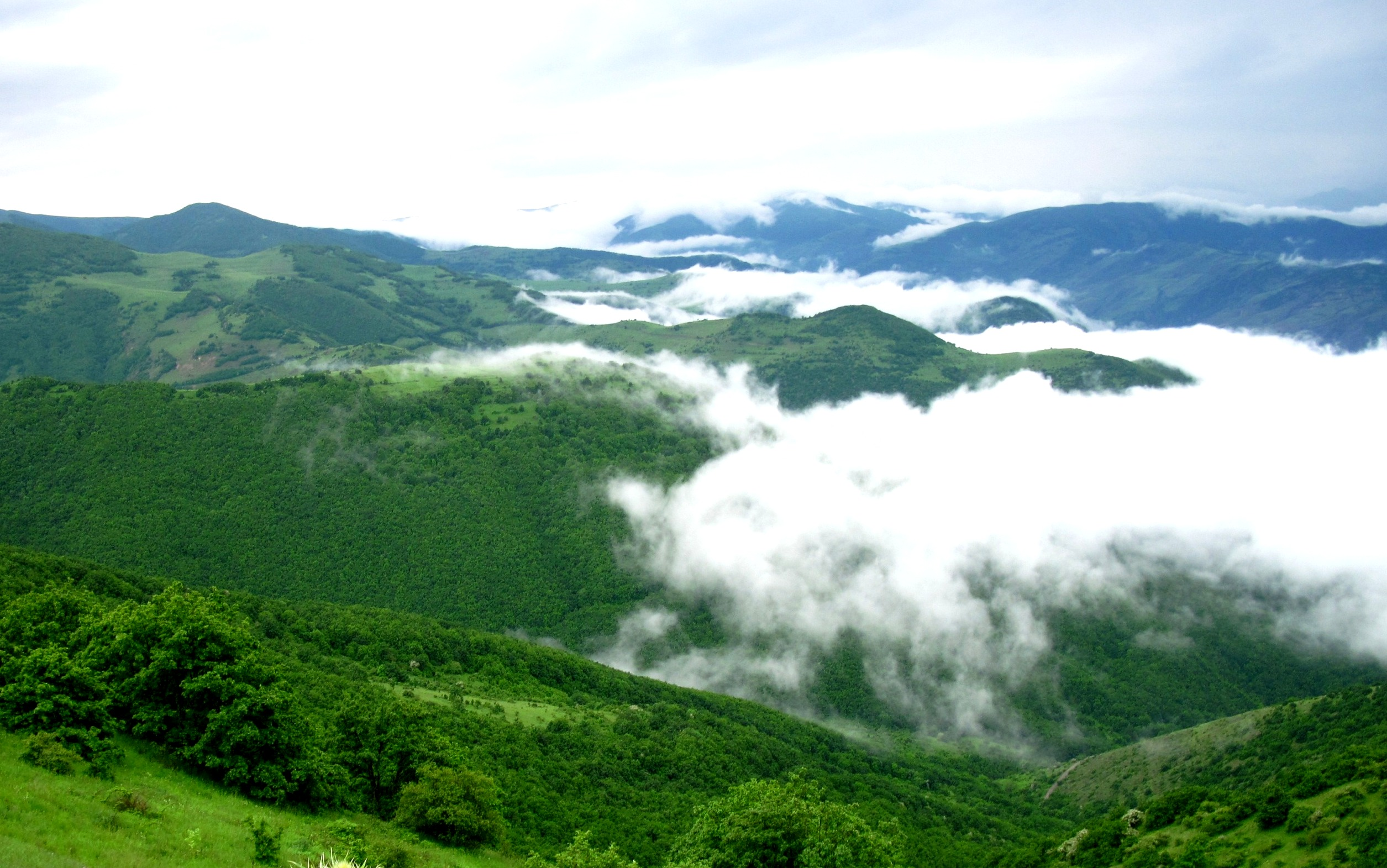
Mountainous areas of Khoda Afarin county

Before the Islamic Revolution of 1978, then a district of Ahar County, had a dynamic economy; the surplus agricultural products from fertile farmlands along Aras were exported to Ahar, and on the lush uplands large herds of sheep were a common sight. Of course, since the turbulent days of Azerbaijan Democratic Government, some residents were travelling to Tehran or Tabriz for seasonal work on construction projects, and by the late 1970s some of these migrant workers were established contractors.

Accordingly, the majority of active male population was spending half of the year in cities. The Islamic Revolution drastically changed social order. In the 1978–1979 period many of the migrant workers in Tehran constructed illegal dwellings on government lands at the North-East of Tehran and moved their families to the city. During the second big migration wave of the 1990s, most villages of the county were evacuated and residents settled in the shanty-towns at the South-West of Tehran. In recent years, some expatriates have returned and constructed decent houses. The county is already experiencing a construction boom. This has rapidly increased demand for construction workers. Moreover, the capital inflow to the county in anticipation of potential boom in Eco-tourism has resulted in launching many projects related to hotels and campgrounds.

== Historical sites ==
- Aynaloo. An old mansion in the lush Aynaloo valley, which was built by wealthy Tomanies in 1907.

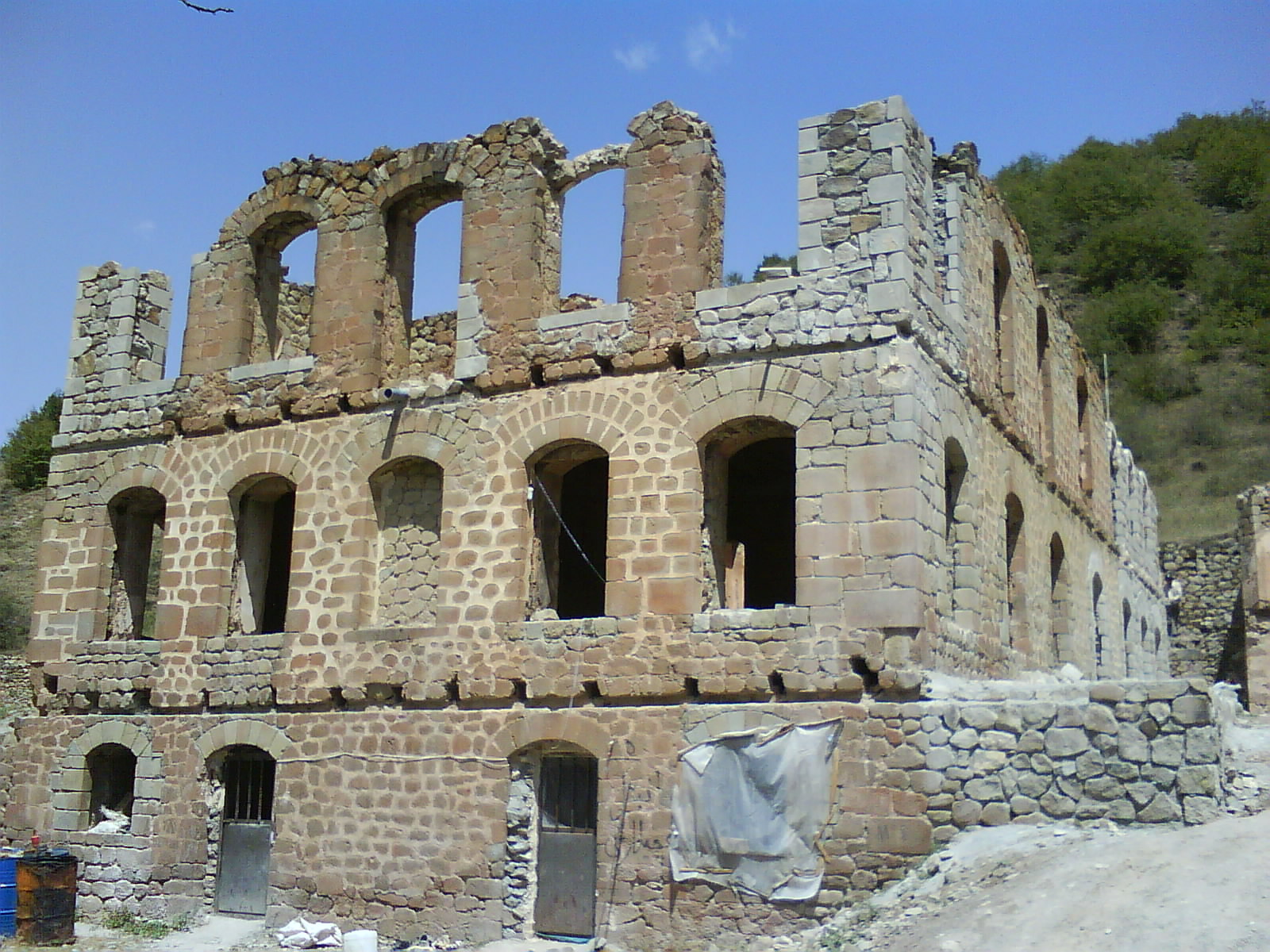
A historical building in Aynaloo. According to the locals it served as a silo for grain storage

- Vinaq. An old mansion in Vinaq village, which was built by Tomanies in 1907. The mansion is similar to the Aynaloo mansion in architecture.
- Baba Seyfaddin pilgrimage site near Garmanab village. The village is also a significantly important place as in last 150 years it has been inhabited by Armenians, followers of Yarsan religion and Shia Islam, respectively. The graveyard of Armenians has been preserved and the writings on the grave stones may provide important clues to the history of Arasbaran.
- Khoda Afarin bridges. Two bridges on Aras river are located near Khomarlu. One bridge is badly damaged and the other is still usable for pedestrians. The later bridge is 160 m in length.
- Alherd village. This historical village has an ancient graveyard with tombstones, unusually, engraved with ornamental figures. It is possible that archaeological studies may unravel significant historical evidences.

== Ashugh music ==
The county has been known as the epicenter of Arasbaran school of Ashugh music. The mountainous terrain, and the socio-cultural upheavals of the past two centuries have given a characteristic melancholic feature to the songs composed by the rebel-poets originating from the region. A revealing example is a song which was composed by Bahman Zamani following the tragic drowning of Samad Behrangi in Aras.

== See also ==
- Khoda Afarin Dam
- List of villages in Khoda Afarin

Media related to Khoda Afarin County at Wikimedia Commons
