= List of cities, towns and villages in East Azerbaijan province =

A list of cities, towns and villages in East Azerbaijan Province of northwestern Iran:

== Alphabetically ==
Cities are in bold text; all others are villages.

=== A ===
Ababin | Abarghan | Abarghan | Abbasabad | Abbasabad | Abbasabad | Abbasabad | Abd ol Jabbar | Abd ol Razzaq | Abdar | Abdarlar | Abdolabad | Abdollahabad | Ab-e Garm | Abellu | Abish Ahmad | Abkhvareh | Abres | Abriq | Abriz | Achachi | Afshar Jiq | Afshar | Afshar | Afshord | Afzal | Agh Bolagh | Agh Bolagh | Agh Bolagh-e Kuranlu | Agh Darak | Agh Darreh | Agh Kahriz | Agh Kand | Agh Qeshlaq | Agh Qeshlaq | Agh Tavaraq | Agh Ziarat | Aghaj Ughli | Aghajari | Aghbolagh | Aghbolagh | Aghbolagh | Aghbolagh-e Alamdar | Aghbolagh-e Fotuhi | Aghbolagh-e Hasan Kandi | Aghbolagh-e Hashtrud | Aghbolagh-e Olya | Aghbolagh-e Sofla | Aghbolagh-e Sofla | Aghcheh Darband | Aghcheh Dizaj | Aghcheh Dizej | Aghcheh Kand | Aghcheh Kandi | Aghcheh Kohal-e Rajabanlu | Aghcheh Kohal-e Zamani | Aghcheh Kohel | Aghcheh Kohel | Aghcheh Mashhad | Aghcheh Mashhad | Aghcheh Mashhad-e Char Dowli | Aghcheh Qeshlaq | Aghcheh Qeshlaq-e Olya | Aghcheh Rish | Aghcheh Rish | Aghcheh Rud | Aghkand-e Qareh Khezer | Aghkand-e Samaraq | Aghmiyun | Aghurabad | Aghuyeh | Aghvaran | Ahaq | Ahar | Ahmadabad | Ahmadabad | Ahmadabad | Ahmadabad | Ahmadabad | Ahmadabad | Ahmadabad-e Garus | Ahmadabad-e Khanliq | Ahmadabad-e Leyqoli | Ahmadabad-e Olya | Ahmadabad-e Shahrak | Ahmadabad-e Sofla | Ahmadluy-e Olya | Ahmadluy-e Sofla | Ajab Shir | Ajab Shir 3 Garrison | Ajami | Ajami | Ajami-ye Kallehbuz | Ajirabad | Ajudanabad | Akbarabad | Akhi Jahan | Akhsakhlar | Akhuleh | Akhund Qeshlaq | Akinabad | Akramabad | Alachiq | Alajujeh | Alakin | Alan | Alanaq | Alanjareq | Alanjeq | Alaqayah | Alateymur | Alavian | Alaviq | Alaviq | Alchalu | Alefabad | Alelu | Alequ | Alharod | Alherd | Ali Akbarlu | Ali Beyg Kandi | Ali Beyg Kandi | Ali Beyglu | Ali Beyglu | Ali Beygluy-e Olya | Ali Beygluy-e Sofla | Ali Bolaghi | Ali Kalbi | Ali Kandi | Ali Khvajeh | Ali Qeshlaqi | Ali Shah | Ali Yar | Aliabad | Aliabad | Aliabad | Aliabad | Aliabad | Aliabad | Aliabad-e Olya | Aliabad-e Qeshlaq | Aliabad-e Sofla | Aligav | Alijan | Alijula | Alikhanlu | Alin Jaq | Alireza Chay | Alishari | Aliverdi Owshaqi | Alkhalaj | Allah Dad | Allah Haqq | Allah Kandi | Allahlu | Allahlu | Allahlu | Allu | Allulu | Almachovan | Almalu | Almalu | Alman-e Qadim | Almas | Alov Kandi | Alpavat | Alpavit | Alqu | Altenji | Alucheh Malek | Alucheh Qeshlaq | Aluchin | Alvan | Alvanaq | Alvandi | Alvar | Alvar-e Olya | Alvar-e Sofla | Amandi | Amestejan | Aminabad | Aminabad | Amir Dizaj | Amir Ghayeb | Amir Zakaria | Amir | Amirabad | Amirabad | Amirabad | Amirabad | Amirabad | Amirabad | Ammnad | Ampar | Amqan | Amrollah | Amu Dizaj | Amuowghli-ye Olya | Amuowghli-ye Sofla | Ana Khatun | Anamoq | Anaqiz | Anarjan | Anarjan | Anbaq-e Hajjikhan | Anbaq-e Javad | Anbaq-e Olya | Anbaq-e Sorkhay | Anbar Dan | Anbardan | Anbarlu | Anbastaq | Andab-e Jadid | Andab-e Qadim | Andabil | Andarab | Andarud-e Olya | Andarud-e Sofla | Andergan | Andis | Angiz | Angoshtjan | Aniq | Anjerd | Annablu | Ansarud | Anviq | Aq Beraz | Aq Dagh-e Olya | Aq Darreh | Aq Dash | Aq Divar | Aq Gonbad | Aq Kahriz | Aq Manar | Aqa Alilu | Aqa Baba Sank | Aqa Baba-ye Faramarzi | Aqa Kandi | Aqa Mirlu | Aqajan | Aqajan Kandi | Aqajeri | Aqamirlu | Aqan | Aqbolagh | Aqbolagh-e Bahman | Aqcheh Owbeh | Aqdaraq-e Jadid | Aqdaraq-e Qadim | Aqel | Aqkand | Arab Kahriz | Arablu | Arabshah Khan | Arabshah-e Daraq | Arabshah-e Khargushan | Aralan | Aras | Araskonay-e Olya | Araskonay-e Sofla | Arbat | Arbat | Arbat | Arbatan | Arbatan | Ardalan | Ardeha | Ardeshir | Areh Jan | Argun | Armak | Armanian | Armedlu-ye Sofla | Armudaq | Arnan | Arpa Darrehsi | Arpa Darrehsi | Arqaneh | Arqatu | Arshatnab | Aruq | Arzanaq | Arzil | Asayesh | Asb Khan | Asbabad | Asbforushan | Asbgaran | Asbhar-e Olya | Asbhar-e Sofla | Asbqaran | Asdaghi | As-e Jadid | As-e Qadim | Asenjan | Asfestan | Asgarabad | Asgarlu | Ashan | Asheqlu | Ashestan | Ashmaq | Ashraf | Ashrafabad | Ashtjeran | Asiran | Askalu Mohammad Hasanlu | Askavaq | Aslan Beyglu | Asli Kandi | Asnaq | Aspos | Astanjin | Astarqan | Astmal | Atalu | Atash Beyg | Atbatan | Atmeyan-e Sofla | Atmeyan-e Vosta | Avalan | Avan Sar | Avan | Avanlu | Avarsin | Avenliq | Avilaq | Avindin | Avin-e Masjedlu | Ayaz | Aydamir | Aydinlu | Aydughmush | Ayenehlu | Ayqer Chaman-e Olya | Ayqer Chaman-e Sofla | Ayri Bujaq | Azarshahr | Azarshahr Railway Station | Azghan | Aziz Kandi | Azizabad | Azizlu | Aznab-e Khaleseh | Aznab-e Olya | Aznab-e Sofla

=== B ===
Baba Jan | Baba Kalak | Baba Kandi | Baba Kandi Rud | Baba Qazi | Bababaghi Hospice | Babak Station | Babay Luy-e Janan Lu | Babaylu | Babereh-ye Olya | Babereh-ye Sofla | Babuneh-ye Olya | Babuneh-ye Sofla | Babuneh-ye Vosta | Badamlu | Badlu | Baftan | Bagh Darrehsi | Bagh Yeri | Baghbanan-e Olya | Baghcheh Jiq | Bagh-e Maruf | Bagh-e Vazir | Bagh-e Yaqub | Bagheshlu | Baghjeghaz-e Olya | Baghjeghaz-e Sofla | Baghlar | Baghlujeh | Bahador | Bahmanabad | Bahram | Bahramabad | Bahr-e Beyg | Bahreman | Bajabaj | Bakhshayesh | Bakhtiarlu | Bakrabad | Bal Daghi | Bala Sang | Balan | Balan | Balesin | Balesin-e Sharifabad | Balestan | Bali Beyglu | Bali Qayah | Balli Qeshlaq | Balujeh | Banafsheh Daraq | Banafsheh Daraq | Banayem | Bangin | Baqer Owghli | Baraghush | Baranliq-e Hoseyn Khan | Baranliq-e Madad Khan | Baranlu | Baranqar | Barazin | Barazin | Barazlu | Bargah | Barjvan | Barmas | Barreh Deh | Baruj | Baruq | Barut Aghaji | Barzandiq | Barzaq | Barzeliq | Bash Bolagh | Bash Kand | Bash Khalaj | Bashab | Bashir | Bashkalan | Bashkand | Bashmaq | Bashmaq | Bashsiz | Bashsiz Ujan | Basirabad | Basit | Basit | Basmenj | Bastamlu | Batlaq | Batmanqelenj-e Sofla | Bavil-e Olya | Bavil-e Sofla | Bayanlucheh | Bayat | Bayat-e Sofla | Bayduq | Bayijuq | Bayqara Kuh | Bayqara Rud | Bayqut | Bayram | Bayram Kandi | Bayram Kandi | Behjatabad | Behnaq | Behruz | Bejushan | Belasejin | Benab e Marand | Benahdiq | Benaravan | Beneh Kohol | Benis | Berenjabad | Berenjaq | Beyg Bolaghi | Beyg Bolaghi | Beyg Kandi | Beygjeh Khatun | Beyglar Kandi | Beyglu | Beyk Kandi | Beyraq | Bezni Bodaq | Bezni-ye Cheragh Mardan | Bezujiq | Bezvan | Bidlu | Bijand | Bijerlu | Bilverdi | Binaq | Birun | Bishak | Bodagh Beyg | Bohal | Bolbol | Bolgheh Teymur | Bolqan | Bolqan Hasan Kandi | Bolukabad | Bolukan | Bonab | Boneh Kaghi | Bonyad Kandi | Bonyanabad | Boqrabad | Borj-e Olya | Borj-e Sofla | Bostanabad | Bozinan | Brick Company | Bukat | Bulalu | Bulanliq | Bur Malek | Burachalu | Burun Daraq | Buyduz

=== C ===
Chabinlu | Chahar Barud | Chahar Khanevar | Chahar Taq | Chakan | Chakhmaq Bolagh-e Olya | Chakhmaq Bolagh-e Sofla | Chalelu | Chalelu Badianlu | Chalelu Chelbianlu | Chaman Zamin | Chanaq | Chanaq Bolagh | Chanzaq | Chapan | Chapqolu | Charagah-e Amir | Charlu | Charmeh Dash | Charmkhowran-e Bala | Charmkhowran-e Sofla | Charzeh Khun | Chat Qayah | Chavan | Chavan Bagh | Chavan-e Alamdar | Chavan-e Olya | Chavan-e Sofla | Chay Baghi | Chay Kandi | Chay Kandi | Chay Kandi | Chay Kandi-ye Kheyr ol Din | Chay Kasan | Cheghalu | Chehgush | Chehregan | Chekan | Chekhmur | Chelanab | Chelan-e Olya | Chelan-e Sofla | Chelleh Khaneh | Chelleh Khaneh-ye Olya | Chelleh Khaneh-ye Sofla | Chelqai | Chenaqchi | Chenar | Chenar | Cher Chera | Cheraghchi | Cheraghil | Cheraghlu | Cheraghlu | Cheran | Chercher | Cherkinlu | Cherlu | Cherteqlu | Cheshmeh Kanan | Cheshmeh Kesh | Cheshmeh Vazan | Cheshmeqan | Chetab-e Olya | Chetab-e Sofla | Chibni | Chichaklu | Chinab | Chol Qeshlaqi | Chonaq Bolagh-e Olya | Chonaq Bolagh-e Sofla | Chopoqlu | Chopoqlu | Chorur | Chowlaqlu | Chubanlar | Chubanlar-e Sardarlu | Chubdar Kandi | Chubeh Daraq | Chuganlu | Chuktu | Chulalu | Chullu | Chupankareh

=== D ===
Dabardan-e Olya | Dabardan-e Sofla | Dadlu | Daghalian-e Bala | Daghalian-e Pain | Daghdaghan | Dahnab | Dali Qiz | Dali Quruqchi | Dalu Hasan | Daman Jan | Damanab | Damanab | Dambaran | Damir Tappeh | Damirchi Haddadan | Damirchi | Damirchi | Damirchi | Damirchi | Danalu | Darab | Daraghazi | Daran | Darandash | Darani | Daraq | Darband | Dari Lu | Darin Daraq | Darin Su | Darreh Jik | Darreh Qeshlaq-e Sofla | Darrehcheh | Darvish Baqqal | Darvish Mohammad | Daryan | Dash Almalu | Dash Alti | Dash Arasi | Dash Atan | Dash Atan | Dash Bashi | Dash Bolagh Bazar | Dash Bolagh | Dash Bolagh | Dash Bolagh | Dash Bolagh-e Kharabeh Galak | Dash Bolagh-e Olya | Dash Bolagh-e Pain | Dash Kasan | Dash Kasan | Dash Qayah Bashi | Dashbolagh | Dashbolagh-e Moghar | Dashkasan | Dashkasan | Dashli | Dashlujeh | Dastjerd | Dastjerd | Dastjerd | Davah Buyoni | Davah Dashi | Davah Yataqi | Davand | Davdan-e Bala | Davdan-e Pain | Daveh Meydani | Daveh Yataqi | Davudlu | Day Mamaq | Dayan | Daylar | Dedlu | Dehdulan | Dehestan | Dehlan | Dehrud | Deklanlu | Delqanab | Derab | Devich | Deylamshah | Di Baglu | Dibaklu | Dibaklu | Didehban | Dijan | Dil Bilmaz | Dinabad | Dinehvar | Dish Gadugi | Dishab | Divrazm | Diz Gavin | Dizaj Azim | Dizaj Hoseyn Beyg | Dizaj Khalil | Dizaj | Dizaj | Dizaj-e Aqa Hasan | Dizaj-e Hasan Beyg | Dizaj-e Jalu | Dizaj-e Leyli Khani | Dizaj-e Malek | Dizaj-e Mir Homay | Dizaj-e Olya | Dizaj-e Parvaneh | Dizaj-e Qorban | Dizaj-e Reza Qoli Beyg | Dizaj-e Safar Ali | Dizaj-e Sefid | Dizaj-e Shur | Dizaj-e Talkhaj | Dizajvar | Dizbin | Diznab | Do Deh | Dongah | Dorraj-e Olya | Dorraj-e Sofla | Dowgi Daraq | Dowlatabad | Dowlatabad | Dowrmishkhanlu | Dowshdur | Dughan | Dugijan | Dul Qeshlaqi | Dulab-e Karanlu | Dulan | Dumriq | Duniq | Dupiq | Duriq | Dush | Dushdur | Duz Aychi | Duzal | Duzanan | Duzduzan

=== E ===
Ebrahim Beyglu | Ebrahim Sami | Efil | Ekis | Emam Chay | Emarat | Enab | Ersi | Ersi | Esfahlan | Esfangareh | Esfanjan | Esfehanjiq | Esfestanaj | Eshaqlu | Eskandan | Eskandar | Eslamabad | Eslamabad | Eslamabad | Eslami Emam Reza Garrison | Esmailabad | Estelu | Estiar | Estiar | Eydarshan | Eydlu | Eyn ol Din | Eynabad | Eyshabad | Eyvaq | Eyvaraq

=== F ===
Fandoqlu | Farahiyeh | Farfar | Fargush | Farkharan | Fathabad | Fathali-ye Soltanlu | Fathollah Kandi | Ferhadlu | Firuz Salar | Fujeh Kandi

=== G ===
Gajin | Galah Khaneh | Galbus | Galehban | Galin Qayah | Galizeh | Galv | Gamand | Gamichi | Gandom Nan | Gangadik | Ganjabad-e Olya | Ganjabad-e Sofla | Ganji | Ganjin | Garangah | Garrus | Gav | Gavahan | Gavaher | Gavani | Gavanlu | Gavar | Gavar | Gavashin | Gavdel | Gavij | Gavineh Rud | Gavlan | Gavliq | Gazan Band | Gechi Qeshlaq-e Olya | Gechi Qeshlaq-e Sofla | Gechi Qeshlaq-e Vosta | Gelder | Geleh Deh Kuh | Geleh Deh Rud | Genanlu-ye Hasan Soltanlu | Gerami | Gerd Alu | Gerdah Sang | Gerdeh Layan | Gerdeh Zaylu | Gezafer | Ghallehzar | Gharib Dust | Ghelman Saray | Gholamlu | Gildir | Godaklu | Gol Akhar | Gol Anbar | Gol Chavan | Gol Chul | Gol Faraj | Gol Qasem | Gol Tappeh | Gol Tappeh | Gol Tappeh | Gol Tappeh | Gol Tappeh-ye Kheyrabad | Gol Zar | Gol | Gol | Golabad | Golabad | Golakhvor | Goldaraq | Golehin | Golestan-e Olya | Golestan-e Sofla | Goleytar | Golgolab | Goli Bolagh | Goli Bolagh-e Gonbadlu | Goli Kand | Goli | Goljar | Gollar | Gollujeh | Gollujeh-ye Abellu | Goltappeh-ye Hasanabad | Golujeh | Golujeh | Golujeh | Golujeh-ye Eslam | Golujeh-ye Ghami | Golujeh-ye Hasan Beyg | Golujeh-ye Khaleseh | Golujeh-ye Mohammad Khan | Golujeh-ye Olya | Golujeh-ye Said | Golviran | Golzar | Gomanj-e Olya | Gomanj-e Sofla | Gomeyn | Gomishabad | Gonbad | Gonbad | Gonbadan | Gonbar | Goshayesh | Goshayesh | Goshayesh | Gowaravan | Gowijeh Qaleh | Gowjeh Qaleh-ye Olya | Gowjeh Qaleh-ye Sofla | Gowrand | Gowravan | Gowy Daraq-e Olya | Gowy Daraq-e Sofla | Gowyjeh Qomlaq | Gug Daraq | Gugan | Gugar Chinlu | Gugarchin | Gun Dughdi | Gun Gowrmez | Gunah Bakhan | Gundughdi | Guneh Qarshu | Gunjik | Gurchin | Gurjiq | Gurom Daraq | Gurvan-e Bozorg | Gurvan-e Kuchak | Guy Aghaj | Guy Bolagh-e Pain | Guy Dash | Guydaraq Kandi | Guyjeh Qamalaq | Guyjeh-ye Soltan | Guzalan

=== H ===
Habash | Haddadan | Hadishahr | Hafdaran | Hafez | Haft Cheshmeh | Haft Cheshmeh | Haft Cheshmeh | Haji Baqer Kandi | Hajj Abdal | Hajj Aqa | Hajj Khalil | Hajji Hemmatlu | Hajji Kandi | Hajji Kandi-ye Olya | Hajji Kandi-ye Sofla | Hajji Kord | Hajji Mir | Hajji Mosayyeb | Hajji Yuseflu-ye Olya | Hajji Yuseflu-ye Sofla | Hajjiabad | Hajjilar | Halilu | Hallaj-e Olya | Hallaj-e Sofla | Ham Neshin | Hamadan | Hamamlu | Hamdamlu | Hammam | Hampa | Hapik Bolagh | Harab | Hararati Power Station | Harasban | Hargalan | Harna | Haruniyeh | Harzanaq | Harzand Station | Harzand-e Atiq | Harzand-e Jadid | Harzandiq | Harzeh Varz | Hasan Ali-ye Kadkhodalu | Hasan Beyglu | Hasan Kandi Kuh | Hasan Kandi Rud | Hasan Khan Baghi | Hasan Kohal | Hasan Qeshlaqi | Hasanabad | Hasanabad | Hasanabad | Hasanabad | Hasanjan | Hasanjan Kuh | Hasanlu | Hashtrud | Hashtrud Station | Hasratan | Havay | Havistin | Hejran Dust | Helan | Helan | Helan-e Safarali | Helemsi | Henabad-e Olya | Henabad-e Sofla | Hendelan | Heraq | Heravan | Heravi | Heris | Heris | Heris | Heris | Heris | Hesar Qaranqu | Hesar | Hesar | Hesar | Hesar-e Meydan Daghi | Hesar-e Seyyedlar | Hesban | Heshiabad | Heybat Beyglu | Heydarabad | Heydarabad | Heydarabad | Heydarabad | Heydarkanlu | Heyran-e Olya | Hezaran-e Olya | Hezaran-e Sofla | Hezehburan | Hiaq | Hiq | Hirvan | Hizeh Jan | Holan | Holaq | Homarahlu | Homay-e Olya | Homay-e Sofla | Homu | Hoseyn Kandi | Hoseynabad | Hoseynabad | Hoseynali Beyglu | Hoseyni-ye Olya | Hovin | Hujqan | Huliq | Hur Moghan-e Olya | Hur Moghan-e Sofla | Hurand | Huri | Huri Daraq | Hurilar

=== I ===
Ichi Daraq | Idahlu | Idahluy-e Bozorg | Idahlu-ye Khalifeh | Idahlu-ye Khan | Idahluy-e Kuchek | Idehlu | Idi Guz | Il Darrehsi | Il Yurdi | Ilan Kash | Ilat-e Yalquz Aghaj | Ilkadeh | Ilkhchi | Ilkhechi | Illi | Ilsovan | Imeshjeh | Injar | Iraj | Iranaq | Iranchi | Iri-ye Olya | Iri-ye Sofla | Ishlaq | Ishlaq Kandi | Ivand

=== J ===
Jaban | Jabinad | Jafar Qoli Owshaghi | Jafarabad | Jafarabad | Jafarabad | Jafarabad | Jahandiz | Jahangir Kandi | Jajan | Jalayer | Jalilabad | Jaliq | Jaliq | Jamalabad | Jamalabad | Jamalabad | Jameeh Bozorg | Janan Lu | Janbahan | Jani Beyglu | Janqur | Janqur | Jarchi Kandi Kuh | Jarzang | Javan Qaleh | Javan Sheykh | Javanan-e Goruh | Javash | Jeghanab | Jegher | Jehizdan | Jeldeh Bakhan | Jeyran Bolaghi | Jeyran Darreh | Jeyran-e Olya | Jeyran-e Sofla | Jigh Jigh | Jin Qeshlaqi | Jiqeh | Jodaqayeh | Joghanab-e Olya | Joghanab-e Sofla | Joghol-e Olya | Joghol-e Sofla | Jolfa | Jond | Juband | Juki-ye Bizhan | Juki-ye Vosta | Juqan-e Bozorg | Juqan-e Kuchak | Jushin | Juvarim

=== K ===
Kabolabad | Kabud Gonbad | Kabudan | Kadijan | Kadkhodalu-ye Bala | Kadkhodalu-ye Pain | Kafi ol Molk | Kaghlu Guzlu | Kahaq | Kahelqu | Kahjuq | Kahlik Bolaghi | Kahnamu | Kahriz | Kahvarin | Kalah Now | Kalahjah | Kalalaq | Kalaleh Eslami | Kalaleh | Kalaleh-ye Olya | Kalaleh-ye Sofla | Kalam | Kalan | Kalan | Kalankash | Kalantar | Kalantar-e Olya | Kalantar-e Sofla | Kalash | Kalasur | Kalb Ali Kandi | Kalb Kandi | Kalb Kandi | Kaleybar | Kalghan | Kalhor | Kalhur | Kali Quzi | Kalian | Kalijan | Kali-ye Olya | Kali-ye Sofla | Kalkesh | Kalkin | Kalleh Gah | Kalleh Gerd | Kalu | Kalu | Kalyan | Kamajari | Kamarkuh | Kamelabad | Kanbedan | Kandeh | Kandovan | Kandovan | Kandovan | Kangavar | Kangolabad | Kanzeh Rud | Kaqalaq | Karajabad | Karam Javan | Karameh | Karamjavan | Karamlu | Karangan | Karaviq | Kardowjin | Kargan-e Qadim | Kargaran | Kargartan | Kargas | Karimabad | Karimabad | Karkaj | Kasalan | Kasanaq | Kashan | Kasin | Kavanaq | Kavir | Kazaraj | Keh | Kehdolan | Kerishan | Kesajin | Keshish Qeshlaqi | Keyqobad | Kezbin | Khachik | Khadem Kandi | Khak Vanaq | Khaki | Khalaf Ansar | Khalaf Beygluy-e Olya | Khalaf Beygluy-e Sofla | Khalaf | Khalaj | Khalan | Khalfian | Khalifeh Baghi | Khalifeh Kamal | Khalifeh Kandi | Khalifeh Kandi | Khalifeh Kandi-ye Hatam | Khalifehlu | Khalifehlu | Khalileh Deh | Khalilvand | Khamaneh | Khan Kandi | Khan Kandi | Khan Khanom | Khan Yurdi | Khanamir | Khanbaghi | Khandaq | Khaneh Sar | Khaneh-ye Barq-e Isa Khani | Khaneh-ye Barq-e Jadid | Khaneh-ye Barq-e Qadim | Khaneh-ye Khosrow | Khaneqah Kandi | Khaneqah Kolahi | Khaneqah | Khaneqah | Khaneqah | Khaneqah | Khaneqah-e Sofla | Khanian | Khanqah | Kharaju | Kharaju | Kharil | Kharvana | Khasabad | Khasehlar | Khashen Daraq | Khaslu | Khatab-e Sofla | Khatun Gonay | Khatunabad | Khatunabad | Khatunabad | Khavaran | Khazar Guran-e Olya | Khelejan | Khenavand | Kheyr ol Din | Kheyrabad | Kheyrabad | Kheyreh Masjed | Khezerlu | Khezerlu | Khezrabad | Khoda Qoli | Khomarlu | Khorasanak Station | Khorasanlu | Khordeh Qeshlaq | Khorma Zard | Khormalu | Khorram Daraq | Khorramabad | Khoshgenab | Khosrowshahr | Khotai | Khotb | Khubestan | Khubyar | Khubyarlu | Khuniq | Khunirud | Khush Tazeh | Khusheh Mehr | Khuy Suroq | Khvajeh Aur | Khvajeh Deh | Khvajeh Dizaj | Khvajeh Ghias | Khvajeh Marjan | Khvajeh Shahi | Khvajeh | Khvajehlar-e Olya | Khvajehlar-e Sofla | Khvajehlar-e Vosta | Khvoindizaj | Khvor Khvor | Khvordeh Bolagh | Khvorjestan | Khvoshganab | Khvoy Narud | Kighal | Kin Ab | Kivaj | Kohban | Kohel Bolagh | Kohel Bolagh | Kohl Jik | Kohlan | Kohneh Lu | Kohneh Qeshlaq | Kohol | Kojaabad | Kolluk Daraq | Kolvanaq | Kolvanaq | Koman | Komar-e Olya | Komar-e Sofla | Kond Rud | Kond Rud | Kondelaj | Kor | Kord Ahmad-e Olya | Kord Ahmad-e Sofla | Kord Kandi | Kord Kandi | Kord Kandi | Kordabad | Kordasht | Kordeh Deh | Kordlaqan | Kordlar | Kordlar | Kordlar | Kordlar-e Tarancheh | Kor-e Sofla | Korjan | Korrab | Koshksaray | Kotalah Kamar | Kozanaq | Kuh Kamar | Kuhestanaq | Kuhnab | Kuhsalar-e Olya | Kuhsalar-e Sofla | Kujan | Kujan | Kukhalu | Kukhalu | Kula | Kuli Darreh | Kur Bolagh | Kur Molla | Kurakesh | Kuran | Kureh Bolagh | Kureh Daraq | Kurjeh | Kurzeh | Kusalar | Kusalar | Kusalar | Kuseh Safar | Kushan-e Mirza Rahim | Kushk | Kushnaq | Kutah Mehr | Kuzeh Kanan

=== L ===
Lahijan | Laklar | Laklar | Lalan-e Olya | Lalan-e Sofla | Laleh Bejan | Lamashan | Lambaran | Lameh Eslam | Lameh-ye Arameneh | Lamhuni | Lanjevan | Lar | Larijan | Larijan-e Olya | Larijan-e Sofla | Leghlan | Leylan | Leyli Daghi | Leyli Khaneh | Lijin | Lilab | Limlu | Liqvan | Livanlu | Livar | Livarjan | Lomeh Daraq | Loqman | Lorum | Lotfabad | Lowtejan

=== M ===
Madineh Qeshlaqi | Mafruz Lu | Mahbubabad | Mahiabad | Mahmudabad | Mahmudabad | Mahmudabad | Majarshin | Majidabad | Majidabad | Makatu | Makh | Makhdum Kandi | Makhuleh | Malahuni | Malek Kian | Malek Qozat | Malek Talesh | Malekan | Malekzadeh | Maman | Mameh Shir | Mamqan | Manishgah | Manqutay | Mansurabad | Maqsudlu | Maragheh | Marand | Marazad | Mardabad | Mardanaqom | Mardilu | Marjanlu | Markid Kharabehsi | Markid | Markid | Marnab | Marushin | Marv Dizaj | Maryam | Marzabad | Marzabad | Marzrud | Mashahir | Mashhad Hasanlu | Mashhadi Kandi | Mashnaq | Masjedlu | Masqaran | Matanaq | Mavaluy-e Olya | Mavaluy-e Sofla | Mavi | Mayan-e Olya | Mayan-e Sofla | Mazgar | Mazraeh | Mazraeh-ye Akrad | Mazraeh-ye Gura | Mazraeh-ye Hajj Abedin | Mazraeh-ye Jahangir | Mazraeh-ye Liveh | Mazraeh-ye Mazare | Mazraeh-ye Paridan | Mazraeh-ye Savareh | Mazraeh-ye Shadi | Mehdinlu | Mehin | Mehman | Mehmandar | Mehmandar-e Olya | Mehmandar-e Sofla | Mehmandust | Mehmanlu | Mehrabad | Mehraban | Mehram | Mehtar Ahmad | Mehtarlu | Melkhas | Mendejin | Menjab-e Jadid | Menjab-e Qadim | Meqas-e Jadid | Meqas-e Qadim | Mesan | Meshgin Jiq | Meshkabad-e Qadim | Meshk-e Anbar | Meyaneh Station | Meydan Jiq | Meydan Jiq | Meydanlar | Meymunaq | Miab | Mian Bazur | Miandaraq | MIaneh | Mianeh-ye Kord Ahmad | Miardan | Mikandi | Milaq | Minaq | Minbash-e Hesarlu | Mir Kuh-e Olya | Mir Kuh-e Sofla | Mir Kuh-e Vosta | Mirza Ali Kandi | Mirza Beyg Kandi | Mirza Mohammadabad | Miveh Rud | Mizab | Mobarakabad | Moghamir | Moghanjiq | Moghar | Mohammad Alilu | Mohammad Hasanlu | Mohammad Kandi | Mohammad Salehu | Mohammadabad | Mohammadan | Moheb Alilu | Mohrdar | Mohsenabad | Mohsenabad | Mohsenabad | Mojirabad | Molk | Molk-e Daraq | Molla Hajji | Molla Hamzeh | Molla Jiq | Molla Mahmud | Molla Qasem | Molla Qasem | Molla Sarab | Molla Yaqub | Molla Yusof | Mollalar | Mollalar-e Mohammadreza Kandi | Mollalu | Mollalu | Moluk | Monavvar | Moradlu | Moradlu | Mordeh Katan | Morduq | Morteza Qoli Kandi | Mosanlu | Moshirabad | Moshirabad | Mostafa Chay | Mostafa Kandi | Motaalleq | Mujumbar | Mulan | Mulavi Kuranlu | Mulu | Munaq | Musa Daraq | Musa Kandi | Musa Qayeh-ye Abu ol Hasan | Musalu

=== N ===
Nabi Jan | Nabi Sufi | Nachit Kuranlu | Nachit-e Kuranlu | Nadilu | Nahand | Nahar | Nahiyeh | Nahran | Najaf-e Tarakomeh | Nakherchi Bolaghi | Namnaq | Namrur | Nanesa | Naposhteh | Naqduz | Naqqareh Kub-e Jadid | Naqqareh Kub-e Qadim | Nar Ab | Nargesabad | Narjabad | Narmiq | Narmiq | Nasir Kandi | Nasir Kandi | Nasirabad | Nasirabad | Nasirabad-e Olya | Nasirabad-e Sofla | Navansar | Navliq | Nazar Kandi | Nazarkahrizi | Nazarlu | Nazemabad | Nebrin | Nechaq | Negarestan | Nehriq | Nematabad | Nematollah | Neqabad | Neqlan | Neshaq | Neshlandeh | Ney Baghi | Neycharan | Niq | Nohor | Nokhvodabad | Noqadi | Nosratabad | Nosratabad | Nosratabad-e Laklar | Nova | Nowdiq | Nowduzaq | Nowjeh Deh Daraq | Nowjeh Deh | Nowjeh Deh | Nowjeh Deh-e Olya | Nowjeh Deh-e Sadat | Nowjeh Deh-e Sheykhlar | Nowjeh Deh-ye Sofla | Nowjeh Mehr | Nowruzabad | Nowsaleh | Nowshahr | Nowshiravan | Nujeh Deh | Nujeh Deh-e Kuh | Nurabad | Nurduz

=== O ===
Ojaq Kandi | Ojaq Kandi | Ojaq Kandi | Okuz Gonbadi | Omran Kandi | Ordaklu | Oruj | Oryan Tappeh | Oshdalaq | Oshdalaq-e Olya | Oshdalaq-e Sofla | Oshnar | Oskanluy-e Olya | Oskanluy-e Sofla | Oskelu | Osku | Oti Kandi | Owch Bolagh | Owchbolagh | Owghan | Owkhchi | Owli | Owli Qeshlaq | Owrang | Owranjaq | Owraq | Owrta Kand | Owrtasu | Owshendel | Owzun Owbeh | Owzun Qayah | Ozbak | Ozumchi

=== P ===
Pahnavar | Pakchin | Palchoqlu | Palchoqlu | Paldaran | Paletlu | Paralar | Param | Parcheh Qeshlaq | Parcheh Qeshlaq | Parchin Bolagh | Pardul | Parijan | Parkab | Parviz Khanlu | Pasha Beyg | Pashtab | Pavares | Pesteh Beyglu | Pesyan | Peyghan | Peyk | Pir Ahmadlu | Pir Aziz | Pir Bala | Pir Bolagh | Pir Eshaq | Pir Hadian | Pir Lujeh | Pir Qoli | Pir Saqqa | Pir Soltan | Pirasmillu | Pirchupan | Pireh Mashan | Pireh Yusefan | Pireh Yusefian-e Olya | Pireh Yusefian-e Sofla | Pirehlar-e Shah Qasem | Pirlar-e Sofla | Pishiklu | Piyam | Piyejik | Postakan | Posyan | Pursekhlu

=== Q ===
Qabaq Tappeh | Qadamgah | Qahremanlu | Qalamlu | Qalandar | Qaleh Jiq | Qaleh Juq | Qaleh Juq | Qaleh Juq | Qaleh Juq-e Najafqoli Khan | Qaleh Juq-e Olya | Qaleh Juq-e Sofla | Qaleh Kandi | Qaleh Kandi | Qaleh Khaleseh | Qaleh Malek | Qaleh Qazi | Qaleh Sangi | Qalehcheh | Qalehlar | Qalehlu | Qaleh-ye Aslanian | Qaleh-ye Bashi | Qaleh-ye Hoseynabad | Qaleh-ye Maraghush | Qaleh-ye Olya | Qaleh-ye Sheykh | Qalujeh | Qalyan Saz | Qamar Kandi | Qamesh Aghol | Qamishlu | Qandhar | Qandilu | Qanlu | Qapulukh | Qaqalu | Qarab-e Olya | Qarab-e Sofla | Qaraghil | Qarah Aghaj | Qarah Aghaj | Qarah Aghaj-e Kushk | Qarah Bolagh | Qarah Bolagh | Qarah Bolagh | Qarah Bolagh | Qarah Bolagh | Qarah Bolagh | Qarah Borqa | Qarah Burun | Qarah Chay-e Hajj Ali | Qarah Chay-e Naqshi | Qarah Chopoq | Qarah Daraq-e Olya-ye Do | Qarah Daraq-e Olya-ye Yek | Qarah Daraq-e Sofla | Qarah Daraq-e Vosta | Qarah Darvish | Qarah Dash | Qarah Div | Qarah Ghurat | Qarah Gol | Qarah Gonay-e Olya | Qarah Gonay-e Sofla | Qarah Gonay-e Vosta | Qarah Gonbad-e Olya | Qarah Gonbad-e Sofla | Qarah Hajjilu | Qarah Hajji-ye Olya | Qarah Hajji-ye Sofla | Qarah Jelu | Qarah Kalak | Qarah Kand | Qarah Kand | Qarah Kowshan | Qarah Masjed | Qarah Owri | Qarah Qayah | Qarah Qayah | Qarah Qayah-ye Shakarlu | Qarah Qeshlaq | Qarah Qeshlaq | Qarah Qishah | Qarah Safar | Qarah Safarlu | Qarah Saqal | Qarah Sufi | Qarah Tappeh | Qarah Tavaraq | Qarah Vali | Qarah Vanlu | Qarah Zaki | Qarajah Qayah-ye Panahi | Qarajeh Malek | Qarajeh Qayah | Qarajeh Qayah | Qarajeh Qayeh | Qarajeh | Qarajeh | Qarajeh-ye Feyzollah | Qarajeh-ye Mohammad | Qaratlu | Qarayen | Qareh Aghaj Rud | Qareh Baba | Qareh Baba | Qareh Bolagh | Qareh Bolagh | Qareh Chal | Qareh Chaman | Qareh Chenaq | Qareh Daraq | Qareh Gol | Qareh Gowzlu | Qareh Guni | Qareh Guni | Qareh Kanlu | Qareh Khezer | Qareh Kohneh-ye Musavi | Qareh Naz-e Olya | Qareh Naz-e Sofla | Qareh Pachanlu | Qareh Qanlu | Qareh Qayah | Qareh Qayeh | Qareh Qayeh | Qareh Qeshlaq | Qareh Quch | Qareh Quch-e Min Bashi | Qareh Tappeh | Qareh Tappeh | Qareh Tappeh | Qareh Tikanlu | Qarehchi-ye Madan | Qarehjah Qayah | Qarkh Bolagh | Qarkhelar | Qarkhun | Qarlujeh | Qarqa | Qarqa | Qartavol | Qasem Daraq | Qasem Kandi | Qashaqchi | Qashqay | Qatanqu | Qatar | Qavaq Amular | Qavaq-e Olya | Qavaq-e Sofla | Qavaqlu | Qavi Dalan | Qayah Bashi-ye Bozorg | Qayah Dibi | Qayah Qeshlaqi | Qayeh Bolaghi | Qayeh Qeshlaq | Qaysh Qur Shaq | Qazan Chay | Qazi Jahan | Qazi Kand | Qazi Vali | Qazilu | Qebleh Masjed | Qelech Khan Kandi | Qelij Chi | Qepchaq | Qepchaq | Qeran Chay Kandi | Qerkh Bolagh | Qerkh Seqer | Qermezi Bagh | Qermezi Gol | Qermezi Qeshlaq | Qeshlaq | Qeshlaq | Qeshlaq | Qeshlaq | Qeshlaq | Qeshlaq-e Agh Laqan | Qeshlaq-e Akhmud-e Olya | Qeshlaq-e Akhmud-e Sofla | Qeshlaq-e Akhmud-e Vosta | Qeshlaq-e Amir | Qeshlaq-e Aramaneh | Qeshlaq-e Bala | Qeshlaq-e Barzaliq | Qeshlaq-e Daghlu | Qeshlaq-e Darchin | Qeshlaq-e Eshqali | Qeshlaq-e Gazlu Hajji Mohammad | Qeshlaq-e Gazlu Hajji Yunes | Qeshlaq-e Hajj Hoseyn | Qeshlaq-e Hajj Lataf Ali | Qeshlaq-e Hajj Owghlu | Qeshlaq-e Hajjilar | Qeshlaq-e Hajjilar | Qeshlaq-e Hasan Kangarlu | Qeshlaq-e Jadid | Qeshlaq-e Kaleybar | Qeshlaq-e Kanehlu | Qeshlaq-e Karanlu | Qeshlaq-e Khaneh-ye Barq | Qeshlaq-e Khanlu | Qeshlaq-e Khiallu | Qeshlaq-e Khurasha-ye Olya | Qeshlaq-e Khurasha-ye Sofla | Qeshlaq-e Kohol | Qeshlaq-e Luleh Darreh Hajj Meyn Bashi-ye Olya | Qeshlaq-e Luleh Darreh Hajj Meyn Bashi-ye Sofla | Qeshlaq-e Madadlu | Qeshlaq-e Meydan Baghi | Qeshlaq-e Moqaddam Shabandeh | Qeshlaq-e Musa Beyg | Qeshlaq-e Najaf Khanlu | Qeshlaq-e Nareh Kesh | Qeshlaq-e Owzbak | Qeshlaq-e Pain | Qeshlaq-e Piazi | Qeshlaq-e Piranlu | Qeshlaq-e Qalehjiq | Qeshlaq-e Qaneh | Qeshlaq-e Qara Khanlu | Qeshlaq-e Qarah Baghlu | Qeshlaq-e Qarah Daghlu | Qeshlaq-e Salmani | Qeshlaq-e Seyf ol Din | Qeshlaq-e Shah Vali | Qeshlaq-e Sowmeeh | Qeshlaq-e Supurgali | Qeshlaq-e Yuseflu | Qeshlaq-e Yuzquyi | Qeshlaq-e Zakhor | Qeymas Khan | Qeynar | Qeysaraq | Qeysnab | Qezel Ahmad | Qezel Bolagh | Qezel Bolagh | Qezel Dagh | Qezel Dizaj | Qezel Gechi | Qezel Lu | Qezel Qaleh-ye Kuranlu | Qezel Qaleh-ye Musulanlu | Qezel Qayah | Qezel Qayah | Qezel Yataq | Qezel Yul | Qezelabad | Qezelejah Meydan | Qezeljeh | Qezeljeh | Qezeljeh | Qezeljeh | Qezeljeh-ye Akrad | Qezeljeh-ye Arshad | Qezeljeh-ye Kharabeh | Qezeljeh-ye Qeshlaq | Qezeljeh-ye Qomeshlu | Qezeljeh-ye Sadat | Qezqapan | Qinarjeh-ye Olya | Qinarjeh-ye Sofla | Qizcheh | Qizleq | Qobadlu | Qoli Beyglu | Qoli Kandi | Qoli Kandi | Qom Tappeh | Qom Tappeh | Qomeshlu | Qomqan | Qorban Kandi | Qorban Kandi | Qotan | Qotanlu | Qubuz | Quch Ahmad | Quch Ghar | Qudchi | Quiun Qeshlaqi | Qujur | Qujur-e Olya | Qujur-e Sofla | Qulan | Qurchi Kandi | Quri Gol | Qurijan | Qurjaq | Qurkhvod | Qurshaqlu | Qurt Qayah Si | Qurtlujeh-e Olya | Qurtlujeh-e Sofla | Quruqchi Rud | Qush Bolagh | Qush Qayahsi | Qush Qayahsi | Qush Qayeh | Qush Qayehsi | Qushchi Bayram Khvajeh | Qushchi | Qushchi | Qusheh Bolagh | Qusheh Bolagh | Qusheh Bolagh | Qusheh Gonbad | Qushehlar | Qushqava | Qushqovan-e Olya | Qushqovan-e Sofla | Quturlar | Quytul | Quyujaq | Quyujaq | Quyujiq | Quyular | Quyun Qeshlaq | Quzllujeh | Quzlu | Quzlu | Quzlujeh | Quzlujeh | Quzuchi Avin

=== R ===
Radar Tabriz | Rahmanlu | Rajolabad | Rashdin | Rashidabad | Rashtabad-e Jadid | Rashtabad-e Qadim | Ravadanaq | Ravasjan | Ravesht-e Bozorg | Ravesht-e Kuchek | Razgah | Razian | Razin | Razin | Razliq | Reyhal | Reyhan | Rostam Kandi | Rumquyusi | Ruzi

=== S ===
Saadatlu | Sabz | Sadi | Safarlu | Safi Khanlu | Sagban | Saghandel | Sahand | Sahlabad | Sahlan | Sahzab | Saidabad | Saidabad | Sakh Selu | Sakht Del | Salah Payahs | Salarabad | Salman Kandi | Samadabad | Samar Khizan | Sambaran | Samsam Kandi | Sanduqlu | Sangarabad | Sanyan-e Sofla | Saqqezchi | Sar Cheshmeh | Sar | Sarab | Sarajlu | Sarajlu | Saramlu | Saran | Sarand | Saransar | Saraskand-e Olya | Saraskand-e Sofla | Saray Deh | Saray | Sardar Kandy | Sardarabad | Sardaraq | Sardha | Sardrud | Sareban Qoli | Sargezeh | Sari Aghol | Sari Beyglu | Sari Bolagh | Sari Chaman | Sari Daraq | Sari Guni | Sari Qamish | Sari Qayah | Sari Qayah | Sari Qayeh | Sari Qayeh | Sari Qeshlaq-e Olya | Sari Suli | Sari Tappeh | Sari Yarqan | Sari Yataq | Sarijalu | Sarilar | Sarin Dizaj | Sarkand-e Dizaj | Sarkarabad | Sarkesh | Sarpa Daraq | Sarujeh | Satellu | Savar | Savaraq | Savojbolagh | Sefid Kamar | Sefidan-e Atiq | Sefideh Khvan | Seghayesh | Sehriq | Sendan | Senowkesh | Senziq | Seqay | Seqehsay | Seqin | Seqin Saray | Serej | Serik | Serqin | Setan | Seyah Dowlan | Seyah Kamar | Seyar-e Olya | Seyar-e Sofla | Seyar-e Vosta | Seyd Beyg | Seyf ol Din Kuh | Seyf ol Din Rud | Seylab | Seyyed Kandi | Seyyed Mansur | Seyyed Qeshlaqi | Seyyedabad | Seyyedlar | Seyyedlar | Seyyedlar | Seyyedlar-e Olya | Seyyedlar-e Sofla | Seyyedli | Seyyedlu | Shab Khaneh | Shaban | Shabdeh | Shabestar | Shad Baghi | Shadbad-e Mashayekh | Shadbad-e Olya | Shaghlan | Shah Ali Beyglu | Shah Bodaghlu | Shah Heydar | Shah Miras | Shah Moradlu | Shah Verdi Kandi | Shahidlu | Shahmar | Shahnavaz-e Olya | Shahnavaz-e Sofla | Shahnavaz-e Vosta | Shahqoli Kandi | Shahrak-e Pain | Shahsavari | Shahverdi | Shakhmelu | Shakhtehlu | Shalalu | Shali | Shalilvand | Shalqun | Shalvari | Shami Kandi | Shamlu | Shamlu-ye Bozorg | Shamlu-ye Kuchak | Shamqoluy-e Sofla | Shanejan | Shangolabad | Shangolabad | Sharabian | Sharafabad | Sharafkhaneh | Sharanlu | Sharazul | Sharfeh | Shariflu | Shariq | Shebli | Shekar Ali Kandi | Shekar Daraq | Shellalu | Shendabad | Sher Sher | Sheykh Ahmad | Sheykh Ahmadlu | Sheykh Baba | Sheykh Beyglu | Sheykh Boran | Sheykh Hasan | Sheykh Hoseynlu | Sheykh Jan | Sheykh Malu | Sheykh ol Eslam | Sheykh ol Eslam | Sheykh Qeshlaq-e Olya | Sheykh Rajab | Sheykh Safi Station | Sheykh Serjin | Sheykh Tabaq | Sheykh Vali | Sheykhdarabad | Sheykhlan-e Olya | Sheykhlan-e Sofla | Sheykhlar | Sheykhlar-e Sofla | Shir Mardan | Shiramin | Shiran | Shiraz | Shirbit | Shireh Jin | Shirin Bolagh | Shirin Daraq | Shirin Kand | Shirin Kand | Shirvan Shahlu | Shirvaneh Deh | Shishavan | Shisheh | Shivyar | Shivyar | Shoja Khanlu | Shoja | Shojaabad | Shojailu | Sholeh Boran | Shonqushabad | Shur Daraq | Shur Daraq | Shur Qeshlaq | Shur Tappeh | Shur-e Qarah Kand | Shureh Del | Shureh Nab | Shurgol | Shurjeh Allah Amanlu | Shurjeh-ye Emam Jomeh | Shurjeh-ye Turaghay | Siah Dowlan | Siah Kalan | Siah Rud | Siah Saran | Sifar | Silgerd | Sirak | Siran | Sis | Sisan-e Qadim | Sivan | Siyah Nab | Sohran | Sohrol | Soleyman Qeshlaq | Soleymanlu | Soltan Gah | Soltanabad | Soltanabad | Soltanabad | Soltanabad-e Agh Ziarat | Soluk | Someklu | Sonqorabad | Sorkheh | Sorkheh Dizaj | Sorkheh Gav | Sorkheh Hesar | Sorkheh Kamran | Sorkheh Riz | Sorkheh | Sorkheh | Sormahlu | Sovin | Sovinj-e Olya | Sovinj-e Sofla | Sowmaeh Del | Sowmaeh Zarrin | Sowmaeh Zarrin | Sowmaeh | Sowmaeh | Sowmaeh | Sowmaeh | Sowmaeh-ye Kabudin | Sowmaeh-ye Olya | Sowmaeh-ye Olya | Sowmaeh-ye Sofla | Sowmaeh-ye Sofla | Sowmeeh | Sowmeeh | Sowmeeh-ye Haq | Sowmeeh-ye Sang | Sowti | Sufi Ahmad | Sufi Hasan | Sufian | Sufilar | Sughanchi | Sughanchi Kuh | Suli Daraq | Suli Daraq | Suli Pir | Sulujeh | Sundakhar | Surbaq | Surna Kahel | Sutat | Suvin

=== T ===
Tabaqlu | Tabestanaq | Tabriz | Taghcheh Jiq | Tahraband | Tajaraq | Tajareh Rud | Tajaroq | Takan | Takanluy-e Olya | Takanluy-e Sofla | Takanlu-ye Sofla | Takht-e Olya | Takht-e Sofla | Talam Khan | Talar | Taleb | Taleb Chaman | Taleb Goli | Taleb Khan | Talesh Kandi | Talkhab | Talvar Bolaghi | Tamtoraq | Tandar Aghaj | Tanderlu | Tapik Darreh | Tappeh-ye Esmailabad | Taqi Kandi | Taraf | Taran | Tarancheh | Tark | Tarkayesh | Tarkhanlar | Tarnab | Tarqoli | Tarun | Tarzam | Tasteghar | Tasuj | Tatar-e Olya | Tatar-e Sofla | Tavaq | Tavil | Tavileh-ye Shami | Tazeh Kand | Tazeh Kand | Tazeh Kand | Tazeh Kand | Tazeh Kand | Tazeh Kand | Tazeh Kand | Tazeh Kand | Tazeh Kand | Tazeh Kand | Tazeh Kand | Tazeh Kand-e Akhvond | Tazeh Kand-e Aliabad | Tazeh Kand-e Bekrabad | Tazeh Kand-e Davudlu | Tazeh Kand-e Divan Ali | Tazeh Kand-e Gol Chavan | Tazeh Kand-e Hurilar | Tazeh Kand-e Khan Kandi | Tazeh Kand-e Khusheh Mehr | Tazeh Kand-e Masqaran | Tazeh Kand-e Nahand | Tazeh Kand-e Nasirabad | Tazeh Kand-e Nasirpur | Tazeh Kand-e Niq | Tazeh Kand-e Olya | Tazeh Kand-e Olya | Tazeh Kand-e Poruch | Tazeh Kand-e Qarah Naz | Tazeh Kand-e Qarajeh Qayah | Tazeh Kand-e Qeshlaq | Tazeh Kand-e Sarand | Tazeh Kand-e Shahverdi | Tazeh Kand-e Sheykh ol Eslam | Tazeh Kand-e Sofla | Tazeh Kand-e Sowlati | Tazeh Kand-e Tahmasb | Tazeh Kand-e Vinaq | Tazeh Kand-e Yaft | Tazeh Qaleh | Tekmeh Dash | Telim Kandi | Telkari | Tevin | Teymur Beyglu | Teymurlu | Teymurlu | Tikmeh Dash | Tikmeh Tappeh | Til | Tin | Tin | Tirabad | Tiramin | Tirshab | Toghay | Tokaldan | Tokhm Del | Tokhtamishlu | Tombakuluq | Torkamanchay | Torkampur | Torkeh Dari | Torklan | Torp | Toryan Qeshlaqi | Tovin | Tu Ali-ye Olya | Tu Ali-ye Sofla | Tubin | Tup Aghaj | Tup Qarah | Tupchi | Turaghay | Turaqayeh | Turchi | Tush Manlu | Tutah Khaneh | Tuyqun

=== U ===
Uch Daraq | Uch Tappeh | Ughli | Uli | Uri | Urshanabad | Urta Qeshlaq-e Olya | Ushtobin | Uzan | Uzi | Uzi

=== V ===
Vakand | Valandaran | Valestan | Vali Kandi | Valilu | Valin | Valin Jeq | Vanehabad | Vaneq-e Olya | Vaneq-e Sofla | Vanestan | Vanjan | Vanlujaq | Vanyar | Varagol | Varazqan | Vardin | Vardin | Varduq | Vargahan | Varjavi | Varkash | Varnakesh | Varnaq | Varqeh-ye Olya | Varzaqan | Varzeqan | Vayqan | Vayqan-e Maqadas | Vazifeh Khvoran | Vediq | Vehil | Vejeni | Veravjen-e Olya | Veravjen-e Sofla | Vieq | Vinaq | Viran Qayah | Vizanab

=== Y ===
Yaddi Bolagh | Yagh Bastlu | Yaghli Bolagh | Yagurg | Yaharchi | Yakhfervazan | Yal Qeshlaqi | Yaleh Qarshow | Yali Qurt | Yalquz Aghaj | Yalquz Aghaj | Yamchi | Yanbolagh | Yanbolaghi | Yanbolaghi-ye Olya | Yanbolaghi-ye Sofla | Yanuq | Yaralujeh | Yarbolaghi | Yasavel | Yasavol | Yashil | Yavar Kandi | Yaychi | Yayijilu | Yayshahr | Yeddi Bolagh | Yekan-e Kahriz | Yekan-e Olya | Yekan-e Sadi | Yelah Qarshu | Yelah Qarshu | Yeli Daraq-e Olya | Yeli Daraq-e Sofla | Yeli-ye Olya | Yeli-ye Sofla | Yengabad-e Chay | Yengabad-e Kuh | Yengejah | Yengejah | Yengejeh | Yengejeh | Yengejeh | Yengejeh | Yengejeh | Yengejeh | Yengejeh | Yengejeh | Yengejeh-ye Daliganlu | Yengejeh-ye Kord | Yengejeh-ye Sadat | Yengejeh-ye Yaranmish | Yengi Esperan | Yengi Kand | Yengi Kand | Yengi Kandi | Yengi Kandi | Yengikand-e Khaneh-ye Barq | Yengikand-e Khusheh Mehr | Yowlqonluy-e Jadid | Yowlqonluy-e Qadim | Yunjalu | Yusefabad | Yusofabad | Yuseflu | Yusoflu | Yuzband | Yuzband | Yuzbash Kandi | Yuzbashlu

=== Z ===
Zabarlu | Zaghanabad | Zaglik-e Kurbolagh | Zaglik-e Olya | Zaglik-e Sofla | Zaglujeh | Zaglujeh | Zaker Kandi | Zaker | Zal | Zamanabad | Zamharir | Zanbalan | Zandabad | Zaneq | Zang Molk | Zangabad | Zangbar | Zangi | Zanjilabad | Zanjir Bolagh | Zanjirabad | Zanjireh | Zarbil | Zardeh Malek | Zardkhaneh | Zardughan | Zaren Kesh | Zargar | Zarghan | Zarin-e Olya | Zarin-e Sofla | Zarnaq | Zarnaq | Zarnaq | Zarnaq | Zarrin Deh | Zarrin Qaba | Zavaraq | Zaviyeh | Zaviyeh | Zaviyeh | Zaviyeh | Zaviyeh | Zavosht | Zenari | Zerenjin | Zereshlu | Zeyn ol Hajjilu | Zeynabad | Ziarlu | Zinab | Zinatlu | Zinjanab | Zir Asef | Ziri | Zirian | Zirkan | Zonuz | Zonuzaq | Zu ol Bin
