= Goli Bolagh =

Goli Bolagh گلي بلاغ
- Village
- Location within Iran
- Coordinates: 37°11′54″N 46°59′09″E
- Country: Iran
- Province: East Azerbaijan
- County: Charuymaq
- Bakhsh: Central
- Rural District: Charuymaq-e Markazi

Population (2006)
  - Total: 64
- Time zone: UTC+3:30 (IRST)
  - Summer (DST): UTC+4:30 (IRDT)

Goli Bolagh (Persian: گلي بلاغ, also Romanized as Golī Bolāgh) is a village in Charuymaq-e Markazi Rural District, in the Central District of Charuymaq County, East Azerbaijan Province, Iran. At the 2006 census, its population was 64, in 12 families.
