= Dupiq =

Dupiq دوپيق
- Village
- Location within Iran
- Coordinates: 38°30′00″N 46°46′00″E
- Country: Iran
- Province: East Azerbaijan
- County: Ahar
- Bakhsh: Central
- Rural District: Azghan

Population (2006)
  - Total: 348
- Time zone: UTC+3:30 (IRST)
  - Summer (DST): UTC+4:30 (IRDT)

Dupiq (Persian: دوپيق, also Romanized as Dūpīq; also known as Depīq) is a village in Azghan Rural District, in the Central District of Ahar County, East Azerbaijan Province, Iran. At the 2006 census, its population was 348, in 73 families.
