= Qebleh Masjed =

Qebleh Masjed قبله مسجد
- Village
- Location within Iran
- Coordinates: 37°34′52″N 46°42′11″E
- Country: Iran
- Province: East Azerbaijan
- County: Bostanabad
- Bakhsh: Tekmeh Dash
- Rural District: Sahandabad

Population (2006)
  - Total: 92
- Time zone: UTC+3:30 (IRST)
  - Summer (DST): UTC+4:30 (IRDT)

Qebleh Masjed (Persian: قبله مسجد; also known as Kibleh Masjid and Qible Mājid) is a village in Sahandabad Rural District, Tekmeh Dash District, Bostanabad County, East Azerbaijan Province, Iran. At the 2006 census, its population was 92, in 21 families.
