= Pavares =

Pavares پاورس
- Village
- Location within Iran
- Coordinates: 37°35′40″N 48°00′59″E
- Country: Iran
- Province: East Azerbaijan
- County: Meyaneh
- Bakhsh: Central
- Rural District: Garmeh-ye Jonubi

Population (2006)
  - Total: 183
- Time zone: UTC+3:30 (IRST)
  - Summer (DST): UTC+4:30 (IRDT)

Pavares (Persian: پاورس, also Romanized as Pāvares and Pavars) is a village in Garmeh-ye Jonubi Rural District, in the Central District of Meyaneh County, East Azerbaijan Province, Iran. At the 2006 census, its population was 183, in 36 families.
