= Kutah Mehr =

Kutah Mehr كوته مهر
- Village
- Location within Iran
- Coordinates: 37°18′21″N 46°05′00″E
- Country: Iran
- Province: East Azerbaijan
- County: Bonab
- Bakhsh: Central
- Rural District: Benajuy-ye Gharbi

Population (2006)
  - Total: 338
- Time zone: UTC+3:30 (IRST)
  - Summer (DST): UTC+4:30 (IRDT)

Kutah Mehr (Persian: كوته مهر, also Romanized as Kūtah Mehr) is a village in Benajuy-ye Gharbi Rural District, in the Central District of Bonab County, East Azerbaijan Province, Iran. At the 2006 census, its population was 338, in 81 families.
