= Hajji Mir =

gara bilagh قره بلاغ
- Village
- Location within Iran
- Coordinates: 37°17′14″N 48°06′28″E
- Country: Iran
- Province: East Azerbaijan
- County: Meyaneh
- Bakhsh: Kaghazkonan
- Rural District: Kaghazkonan-e Markazi

Population (2006)
  - Total: 76
- Time zone: UTC+3:30 (IRST)
  - Summer (DST): UTC+4:30 (IRDT)

gara bilagh (Persian: قارابلاغ, also Romanized as garabilagh) is a village in Kaghazkonan-e Markazi Rural District, Kaghazkonan District, Meyaneh County, East Azerbaijan Province, Iran. At the 2006 local census, its population was 76, in 26 families.
