= Quruqchi Rud =

Quruqchi Rud قوروقچي رود
- Village
- Location within Iran
- Coordinates: 37°39′42″N 46°42′19″E
- Country: Iran
- Province: East Azerbaijan
- County: Bostanabad
- Bakhsh: Central
- Rural District: Ujan-e Gharbi

Population (2006)
  - Total: 376
- Time zone: UTC+3:30 (IRST)
  - Summer (DST): UTC+4:30 (IRDT)

Quruqchi Rud (Persian: قوروقچي رود, also Romanized as Qūrūqchī Rūd; also known as Chāy Qūrūqchī, Qūrqochī Rūd, and Qūrūqchī Rūdī) is a village in Ujan-e Gharbi Rural District, in the Central District of Bostanabad County, East Azerbaijan Province, Iran. At the 2006 census, its population was 376, in 82 families.
