= Shamqoluy-e Sofla =

Shamqoluy-e Sofla شامقلوی سفلی
- Village
- Location within Iran
- Coordinates: 38°44′06″N 45°21′21″E
- Country: Iran
- Province: East Azerbaijan
- County: Marand
- Bakhsh: Yamchi
- Rural District: Yekanat

Population (2006)
  - Total: 40
- Time zone: UTC+3:30 (IRST)
  - Summer (DST): UTC+4:30 (IRDT)

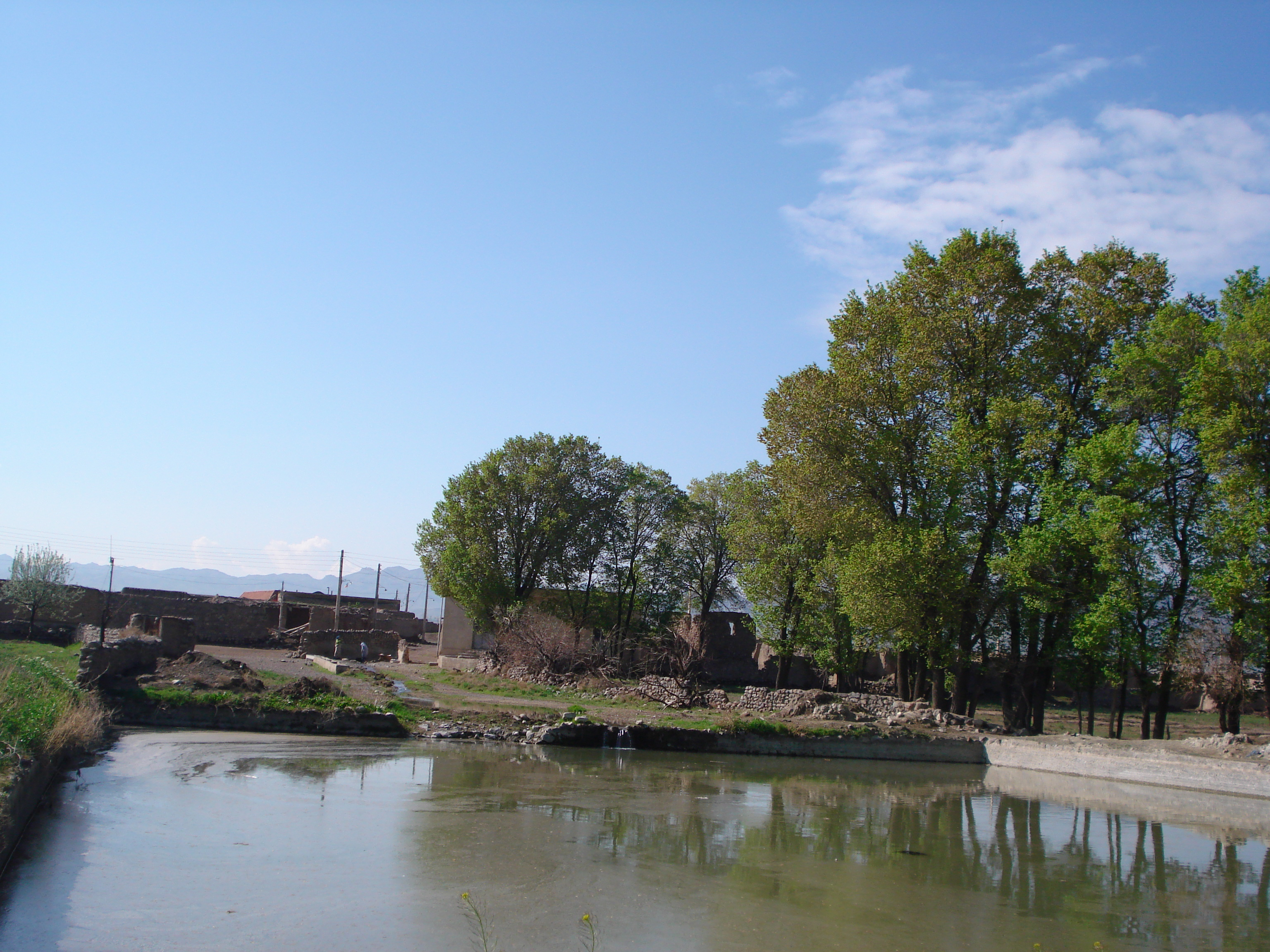
Shamqoluy-e Sofla Village

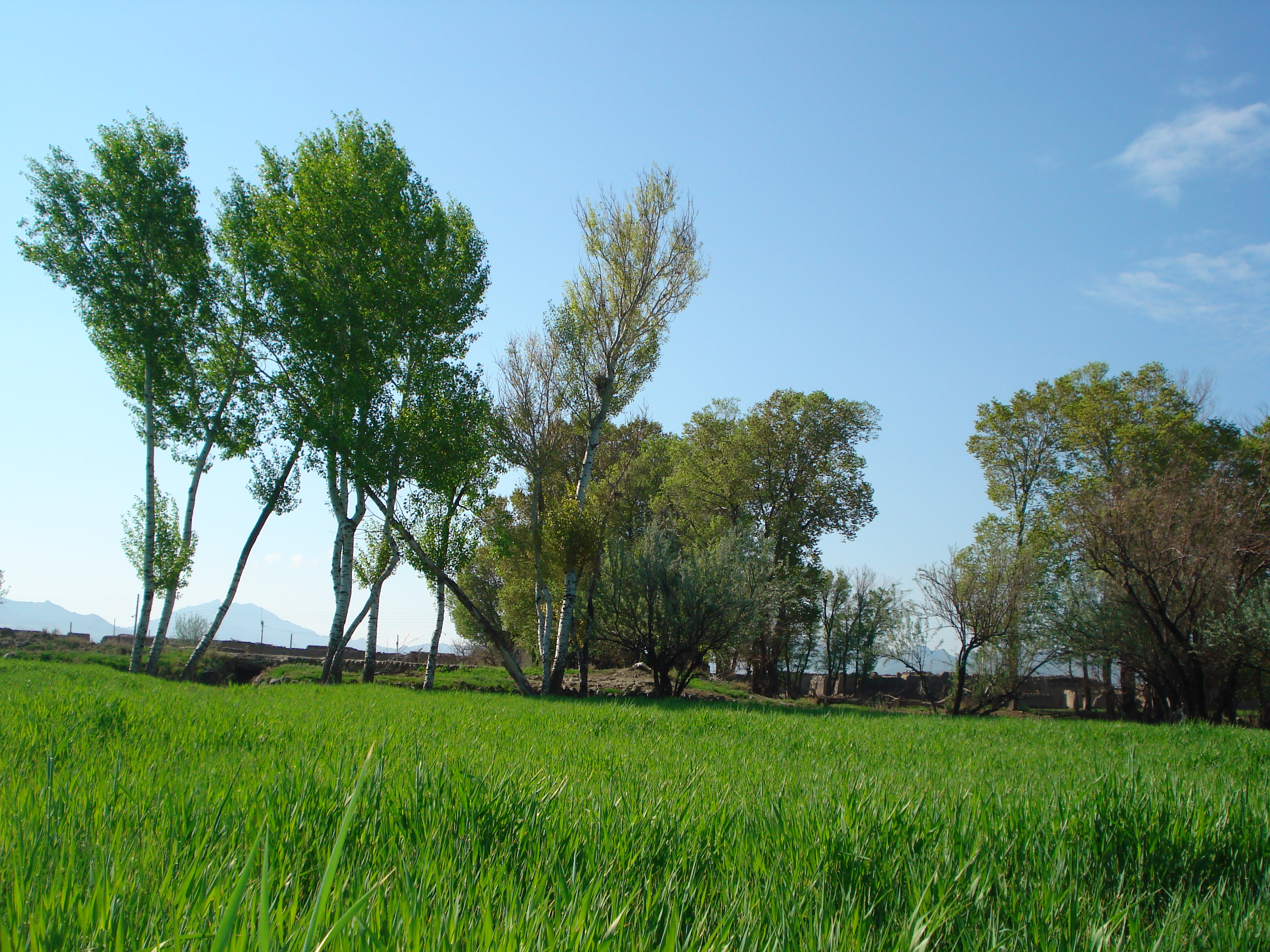
The nature of Shamqoluy-e Sofla

Shamqoluy-e Sofla (Persian: شامقلوی سفلی, also Romanized as Shāmqolūy-e Soflá; also known as Shāh‘olū-ye Soflá, Shāmeqlū, Shāmgholū-ye Soflá, Shāmqolī-ye Soflá, and Shāmqolū-ye Soflá) is a village in Yekanat Rural District, Yamchi District, Marand County, East Azerbaijan Province, Iran. At the 2006 census, its population was 40, in 7 families. The majority of villagers had migrated to Iranian cities Shiraz, Ormiye, Tabriz, Khoy and Marand respectively.
