= Nakherchi Bolaghi =

Nakherchi Bolaghi ناخرچي بلاغي
- Village
- Location within Iran
- Coordinates: 37°11′32″N 46°15′32″E
- Country: Iran
- Province: East Azerbaijan
- County: Malekan
- Bakhsh: Central
- Rural District: Gavdul-e Sharqi

Population (2006)
  - Total: 40
- Time zone: UTC+3:30 (IRST)
  - Summer (DST): UTC+4:30 (IRDT)

Nakherchi Bolaghi (Persian: ناخرچي بلاغي, also Romanized as Nākherchī Bolāghī) is a village in Gavdul-e Sharqi Rural District, in the Central District of Malekan County, East Azerbaijan Province, Iran. At the 2006 census, its population was 40, in 9 families.
