= Jehizdan =

Jehizdan جهيزدان
- Village
- Location within Iran
- Coordinates: 37°49′46″N 47°24′45″E
- Country: Iran
- Province: East Azerbaijan
- County: Sarab
- Bakhsh: Central
- Rural District: Abarghan

Population (2006)
  - Total: 634
- Time zone: UTC+3:30 (IRST)
  - Summer (DST): UTC+4:30 (IRDT)

Jehizdan (Persian: جهيزدان, also Romanized as Jehīzdān; also known as Jehezdān) is a village in Abarghan Rural District, in the Central District of Sarab County, East Azerbaijan Province, Iran. At the 2006 census, its population was 634, in 149 families.
