= Qushqava =

Qushqava قوشقوا
- Village
- Location within Iran
- Coordinates: 37°41′21″N 45°54′39″E
- Country: Iran
- Province: East Azerbaijan
- County: Azarshahr
- Bakhsh: Howmeh
- Rural District: Qebleh Daghi

Population (2006)
  - Total: 205
- Time zone: UTC+3:30 (IRST)
  - Summer (DST): UTC+4:30 (IRDT)

Qushqava (Persian: قوشقوا, also Romanized as Qūshqavā; also known as Qūshqarā) is a village in Qebleh Daghi Rural District, Howmeh District, Azarshahr County, East Azerbaijan Province, Iran. At the 2006 census, its population was 205, in 56 families.
