= Daveh Meydani =

Daveh Meydani دوه ميداني
- Village
- Location within Iran
- Coordinates: 37°14′36″N 46°55′36″E
- Country: Iran
- Province: East Azerbaijan
- County: Charuymaq
- Bakhsh: Central
- Rural District: Varqeh

Population (2006)
  - Total: 44
- Time zone: UTC+3:30 (IRST)
  - Summer (DST): UTC+4:30 (IRDT)

Daveh Meydani (Persian: دوه ميداني, also romanized as Daveh Meydānī) is a village in Varqeh Rural District, in the Central District of Charuymaq County, East Azerbaijan Province, Iran. At the 2006 census, its population was 44 people, distributed in 8 families.
