= Qeshlaq-e Meydan Baghi =

Qeshlaq-e Meydan Baghi قشلاق ميدان باغي
- Village
- Country: Iran
- Province: East Azerbaijan
- County: Ahar
- Bakhsh: Central
- Rural District: Qeshlaq

Population (2006)
  - Total: 51
- Time zone: UTC+3:30 (IRST)
  - Summer (DST): UTC+4:30 (IRDT)

Qeshlaq-e Meydan Baghi (Persian: قشلاق ميدان باغي, also Romanized as Qeshlāq-e Meydān Bāghī) is a village in Qeshlaq Rural District, in the Central District of Ahar County, East Azerbaijan Province, Iran. At the 2006 census, its population was 51, in 9 families.
