= Ilan Kash =

Ilan Kash ايلان كش
- Village
- Location within Iran
- Coordinates: 38°56′02″N 46°52′20″E
- Country: Iran
- Province: East Azerbaijan
- County: Kaleybar
- Bakhsh: Central
- Rural District: Misheh Pareh

Population (2006)
  - Total: 11
- Time zone: UTC+3:30 (IRST)
  - Summer (DST): UTC+4:30 (IRDT)

Ilan Kash (Persian: ايلان كش, also Romanized as Īlān Kash and Īlānkosh; also known as Ilinkyash) is a village in Misheh Pareh Rural District, in the Central District of Kaleybar County, East Azerbaijan Province, Iran. At the 2006 census, its population was 11, in 5 families.
