= Pishiklu =

Pishiklu پشيكلو
- Village
- Location within Iran
- Coordinates: 37°42′05″N 46°38′57″E
- Country: Iran
- Province: East Azerbaijan
- County: Bostanabad
- Bakhsh: Central
- Rural District: Ujan-e Gharbi

Population (2006)
  - Total: 353
- Time zone: UTC+3:30 (IRST)
  - Summer (DST): UTC+4:30 (IRDT)

Pishiklu (Persian: پشيكلو, also Romanized as Pīshīklū; also known as Peshneklū) is a village in Ujan-e Gharbi Rural District, in the Central District of Bostanabad County, East Azerbaijan Province, Iran. At the 2006 census, its population was 353, in 57 families.
