= Shonqushabad =

Shonqushabad شنقوش اباد
- Village
- Location within Iran
- Coordinates: 38°25′55″N 47°09′50″E
- Country: Iran
- Province: East Azerbaijan
- County: Ahar
- Bakhsh: Central
- Rural District: Qeshlaq

Population (2006)
  - Total: 170
- Time zone: UTC+3:30 (IRST)
  - Summer (DST): UTC+4:30 (IRDT)

Shonqushabad (Persian: شنقوش اباد, also Romanized as Shonqūshābād) is a village in Qeshlaq Rural District, in the Central District of Ahar County, East Azerbaijan Province, Iran. At the 2006 census, its population was 170, in 37 families.
