= Ajudanabad =

Ajudanabad اجودان اباد
- Village
- Location within Iran
- Coordinates: 39°02′50″N 47°20′40″E
- Country: Iran
- Province: East Azerbaijan
- County: Kaleybar
- Bakhsh: Abish Ahmad
- Rural District: Abish Ahmad

Population (2006)
  - Total: 554
- Time zone: UTC+3:30 (IRST)
  - Summer (DST): UTC+4:30 (IRDT)

Ajudanabad (Persian: اجودان اباد, also Romanized as Ājūdānābād and Ajūdānābād) is a village in Abish Ahmad Rural District, Abish Ahmad District, Kaleybar County, East Azerbaijan Province, Iran. At the 2006 census, its population was 554, in 104 families.
