= Chaman Zamin =

Chaman Zamin چمن زمين
- Village
- Location within Iran
- Coordinates: 38°19′00″N 46°31′00″E
- Country: Iran
- Province: East Azerbaijan
- County: Heris
- Bakhsh: Khvajeh
- Rural District: Mavazekhan-e Shomali

Population (2006)
  - Total: 144
- Time zone: UTC+3:30 (IRST)
  - Summer (DST): UTC+4:30 (IRDT)

Chaman Zamin (Persian: چمن زمين, also Romanized as Chaman Zamīn; also known as Chinamzami) is a village in Mavazekhan-e Shomali Rural District, Khvajeh District, Heris County, East Azerbaijan Province, Iran. At the 2006 census, its population was 144 in 30 families.
