= Alijula =

Alijula علي جولا
- Village
- Location within Iran
- Coordinates: 36°50′34″N 47°13′10″E
- Country: Iran
- Province: East Azerbaijan
- County: Charuymaq
- Bakhsh: Shadian
- Rural District: Charuymaq-e Jonubesharqi

Population (2006)
  - Total: 53
- Time zone: UTC+3:30 (IRST)
  - Summer (DST): UTC+4:30 (IRDT)

Alijula (Persian: علي جولا, also Romanized as ‘Alījūlā; also known as Ālūjūlā) is a village in Charuymaq-e Jonubesharqi Rural District, Shadian District, Charuymaq County, East Azerbaijan Province, Iran. At the 2006 census, its population was 53, in 9 families.
