= Chalelu Badianlu =

Chalelu Badianlu چاللوباديانلو
- Village
- Country: Iran
- Province: East Azerbaijan
- County: Maragheh
- Bakhsh: Saraju
- Rural District: Quri Chay-ye Gharbi

Population (2006)
  - Total: 133
- Time zone: UTC+3:30 (IRST)
  - Summer (DST): UTC+4:30 (IRDT)

Chalelu Badianlu (Persian: چاللوباديانلو, also Romanized as Chālelū Bādīānlū; also known as Chālelū Naṣīrpūr) is a village in Quri Chay-ye Gharbi Rural District, Saraju District, Maragheh County, East Azerbaijan Province, Iran. At the 2006 census, its population was 133, in 30 families.
