= Jani Beyglu =

Jani Beyglu جاني بيگلو
- Village
- Location within Iran
- Coordinates: 38°37′45″N 47°11′01″E
- Country: Iran
- Province: East Azerbaijan
- County: Kaleybar
- Bakhsh: Central
- Rural District: Peyghan Chayi

Population (2006)
  - Total: 117
- Time zone: UTC+3:30 (IRST)
  - Summer (DST): UTC+4:30 (IRDT)

Jani Beyglu (Persian: جاني بيگلو, also Romanized as Jānī Beyglū; also known as Janbeg, Janibegla, Jānī Beqlā, and Janī Bighloo) is a village in Peyghan Chayi Rural District, in the Central District of Kaleybar County, East Azerbaijan Province, Iran. At the 2006 census, its population was 117, in 25 families.
