= Khalfian =

Khalfian خلفيان
- Village
- Location within Iran
- Coordinates: 38°25′43″N 47°25′02″E
- Country: Iran
- Province: East Azerbaijan
- County: Ahar
- Bakhsh: Central
- Rural District: Qeshlaq

Population (2006)
  - Total: 360
- Time zone: UTC+3:30 (IRST)
  - Summer (DST): UTC+4:30 (IRDT)

Khalfian (Persian: خلفيان, also Romanized as Khalfīān) is a village in Qeshlaq Rural District, in the Central District of Ahar County, East Azerbaijan Province, Iran. At the 2006 census, its population was 360, in 71 families.
