= Tirabad, East Azerbaijan =

Tirabad تيراباد
- Village
- Location within Iran
- Coordinates: 37°39′03″N 47°14′02″E
- Country: Iran
- Province: East Azerbaijan
- County: Meyaneh
- Bakhsh: Torkamanchay
- Rural District: Barvanan-e Gharbi

Population (2006)
  - Total: 132
- Time zone: UTC+3:30 (IRST)
  - Summer (DST): UTC+4:30 (IRDT)

Tirabad (Persian: تيراباد, also Romanized as Tīrābād) is a village in Barvanan-e Gharbi Rural District, Torkamanchay District, Meyaneh County, East Azerbaijan Province, Iran. At the 2006 census, its population was 132, in 26 families.
