= Bishak =

Bishak بيشك
- Village
- Location within Iran
- Coordinates: 38°35′50″N 46°19′34″E
- Country: Iran
- Province: East Azerbaijan
- County: Varzaqan
- Bakhsh: Kharvana
- Rural District: Jushin

Population (2006)
  - Total: 83
- Time zone: UTC+3:30 (IRST)
  - Summer (DST): UTC+4:30 (IRDT)

Bishak (Azerbaijani: Beşşək بشکPersian: بيشك, also Romanized as Bīshak; also known as Beshāk, in "Old Azeri" or "Pahlavi language" it means "wood"; in modern Persian it has changed into "Bishe" or "بیشه". The village is in Jushin Rural District, Kharvana District, Varzaqan County, East Azerbaijan Province, Iran. At the 2006 census, its population was 83, in 34 families.
