= Eydarshan =

Eydarshan ايدرشان
- Village
- Location within Iran
- Coordinates: 37°47′38″N 47°34′31″E
- Country: Iran
- Province: East Azerbaijan
- County: Sarab
- Bakhsh: Central
- Rural District: Howmeh

Population (2006)
  - Total: 144
- Time zone: UTC+3:30 (IRST)
  - Summer (DST): UTC+4:30 (IRDT)

Eydarshan (Persian: ايدرشان, also Romanized as Eydarshān; also known as Eydīrshān) is a village in Howmeh Rural District, in the Central District of Sarab County, East Azerbaijan Province, Iran. At the 2006 census, its population was 144, in 36 families.
