= Qaleh-ye Bashi =

Qaleh-ye Bashi قلعه باشي
- Village
- Location within Iran
- Coordinates: 38°23′24″N 47°17′11″E
- Country: Iran
- Province: East Azerbaijan
- County: Ahar
- Bakhsh: Central
- Rural District: Qeshlaq

Population (2006)
  - Total: 84
- Time zone: UTC+3:30 (IRST)
  - Summer (DST): UTC+4:30 (IRDT)

Qaleh-ye Bashi (Persian: قلعه باشي, also Romanized as Qal‘eh-ye Bāshī and Qal‘eh Bāshī) is a village in Qeshlaq Rural District, in the Central District of Ahar County, East Azerbaijan Province, Iran. At the 2006 census, its population was 84, in 15 families.
