= Mosanlu =

Mosanlu مسنلو
- Village
- Location within Iran
- Coordinates: 36°59′40″N 47°23′37″E
- Country: Iran
- Province: East Azerbaijan
- County: Charuymaq
- Bakhsh: Shadian
- Rural District: Charuymaq-e Sharqi

Population (2006)
  - Total: 168
- Time zone: UTC+3:30 (IRST)
  - Summer (DST): UTC+4:30 (IRDT)

Mosanlu (Persian: مسنلو, also Romanized as Mosanlū) is a village in Charuymaq-e Sharqi Rural District, Shadian District, Charuymaq County, East Azerbaijan Province, Iran. At the 2006 census, its population was 168, in 23 families.
