= Kolvanaq, Azarshahr =

Kolvanaq كلوانق
- Village
- Location within Iran
- Coordinates: 37°42′37″N 45°52′45″E
- Country: Iran
- Province: East Azerbaijan
- County: Azarshahr
- Bakhsh: Howmeh
- Rural District: Qebleh Daghi

Population (2006)
  - Total: 368
- Time zone: UTC+3:30 (IRST)
  - Summer (DST): UTC+4:30 (IRDT)

Kolvanaq (Persian: كلوانق, also Romanized as Kolvānaq) is a village in Qebleh Daghi Rural District, Howmeh District, Azarshahr County, East Azerbaijan Province, Iran. At the 2006 census, its population was 368, in 88 families.
