= Yaralujeh =

Yaralujeh يارالوجه
- Village
- Location within Iran
- Coordinates: 38°43′24″N 46°54′30″E
- Country: Iran
- Province: East Azerbaijan
- County: Kaleybar
- Bakhsh: Central
- Rural District: Peyghan Chayi

Population (2006)
  - Total: 10
- Time zone: UTC+3:30 (IRST)
  - Summer (DST): UTC+4:30 (IRDT)

Yaralujeh (Persian: يارالوجه, also Romanized as Yārālūjeh; also known as Yaraldzha and Yārālūcheh) is a village in Peyghan Chayi Rural District, in the Central District of Kaleybar County, East Azerbaijan Province, Iran. At the 2006 census, its population was 10, in 4 families.
