= Gazan Band =

Gazan Band گزان بند
- Village
- Location within Iran
- Coordinates: 38°34′06″N 46°30′56″E
- Country: Iran
- Province: East Azerbaijan
- County: Varzaqan
- Bakhsh: Central
- Rural District: Sina

Population (2006)
  - Total: 255
- Time zone: UTC+3:30 (IRST)
  - Summer (DST): UTC+4:30 (IRDT)

Gazan Band (Persian: گزان بند, also Romanized as Gazān Band) is a village in Sina Rural District, in the Central District of Varzaqan County, East Azerbaijan Province, Iran. At the 2006 census, its population was 255, in 51 families.
