= Qarayen =

Qarayen قراين
- Village
- Location within Iran
- Coordinates: 37°37′21″N 46°47′35″E
- Country: Iran
- Province: East Azerbaijan
- County: Bostanabad
- Bakhsh: Tekmeh Dash
- Rural District: Sahandabad

Population (2006)
  - Total: 77
- Time zone: UTC+3:30 (IRST)
  - Summer (DST): UTC+4:30 (IRDT)

Qarayen (Persian: قراين, also Romanized as Qarāyen) is a village in Sahandabad Rural District, Tekmeh Dash District, Bostanabad County, East Azerbaijan Province, Iran. At the 2006 census, its population was 77, in 16 families.
