= Qarah Sufi =

Qarah Sufi قره صوفي
- Village
- Location within Iran
- Coordinates: 37°00′23″N 46°59′55″E
- Country: Iran
- Province: East Azerbaijan
- County: Charuymaq
- Bakhsh: Central
- Rural District: Charuymaq-e Jonubegharbi

Population (2006)
  - Total: 94
- Time zone: UTC+3:30 (IRST)
  - Summer (DST): UTC+4:30 (IRDT)

Qarah Sufi (Persian: قره صوفي, also Romanized as Qarah Şūfī) is a village in Charuymaq-e Jonubegharbi Rural District, in the Central District of Charuymaq County, East Azerbaijan Province, Iran. At the 2006 census, its population was 94, in 21 families.
