= Yuzbashlu =

Village in East Azerbaijan, Iran

Yuzbashlu يوزباشلو
- Village
- Location within Iran
- Coordinates: 38°24′28″N 47°17′11″E
- Country: Iran
- Province: East Azerbaijan
- County: Ahar
- Bakhsh: Central
- Rural District: Qeshlaq

Population (2006)
  - Total: 19
- Time zone: UTC+3:30 (IRST)
  - Summer (DST): UTC+4:30 (IRDT)

Yuzbashlu (Persian: يوزباشلو, also Romanized as Yūzbāshlū) is a village in Qeshlaq Rural District, in the Central District of Ahar County, East Azerbaijan Province, Iran. At the 2006 census, its population was 19, in 7 families.
