= Dash Bolagh-e Kharabeh Galak =

Dash Bolagh-e Kharabeh Galak داشبلاغ خرابه گلك
- Village
- Location within Iran
- Coordinates: 37°10′35″N 46°45′57″E
- Country: Iran
- Province: East Azerbaijan
- County: Hashtrud
- Bakhsh: Nazarkahrizi
- Rural District: Nazarkahrizi

Population (2006)
  - Total: 320
- Time zone: UTC+3:30 (IRST)
  - Summer (DST): UTC+4:30 (IRDT)

Dash Bolagh-e Kharabeh Galak (Persian: داشبلاغ خرابه گلك, also Romanized as Dāsh Bolāgh-e Kharābeh Galak; also known as Dāsh Bolāgh-e Kharābeh Kalak) is a village in Nazarkahrizi Rural District, Nazarkahrizi District, Hashtrud County, East Azerbaijan Province, Iran. At the 2006 census, its population was 320, in 61 families.
