= Dash Qayah Bashi =

Dash Qayah Bashi داش قيه باشي
- Village
- Location within Iran
- Coordinates: 39°06′59″N 47°13′53″E
- Country: Iran
- Province: East Azerbaijan
- County: Kaleybar
- Bakhsh: Central
- Rural District: Mulan

Population (2006)
  - Total: 64
- Time zone: UTC+3:30 (IRST)
  - Summer (DST): UTC+4:30 (IRDT)

Dash Qayah Bashi (Persian: داش قيه باشي, also Romanized as Dāsh Qayah Bāshī; also known as Dāsh Bāshi) is a village in Mulan Rural District, in the Central District of Kaleybar County, East Azerbaijan Province, Iran. At the 2006 census, its population was 64, in 10 families.
