= Bakhtiarlu =

Coordinates: 39°10′23″N 47°15′33″E

Bakhtiarlu بختيارلو
- Village
- Interactive map of Bakhtiarlu
- Country: Iran
- Province: East Azerbaijan
- County: Kaleybar
- Bakhsh: Abish Ahmad
- Rural District: Qeshlaq

Population (2006)
  - Total: 64
- Time zone: UTC+3:30 (IRST)
  - Summer (DST): UTC+4:30 (IRDT)

Bakhtiarlu (Persian: بختيارلو, also Romanized as Bakhtīārlū) is a village in Qeshlaq Rural District, Abish Ahmad District, Kaleybar County, East Azerbaijan Province, Iran. At the 2006 census, its population was 64, in 13 families.
