= Owrang, East Azerbaijan =

Owrang اورنگ
- Village
- Location within Iran
- Coordinates: 38°29′40″N 46°51′42″E
- Country: Iran
- Province: East Azerbaijan
- County: Ahar
- Bakhsh: Central
- Rural District: Azghan

Population (2006)
  - Total: 427
- Time zone: UTC+3:30 (IRST)
  - Summer (DST): UTC+4:30 (IRDT)

Owrang (Persian: اورنگ, also Romanized as Avarang and Avrang; also known as Arvik) is a village in Azghan Rural District, in the Central District of Ahar County, East Azerbaijan Province, Iran. At the 2006 census, its population was 427, in 110 families.
