= Fathollah Kandi =

Fathollah Kandi فتح اله كندي
- Village
- Country: Iran
- Province: East Azerbaijan
- County: Malekan
- Bakhsh: Leylan
- Rural District: Leylan-e Jonubi

Population (2006)
  - Total: 201
- Time zone: UTC+3:30 (IRST)
  - Summer (DST): UTC+4:30 (IRDT)

Fathollah Kandi (Persian: فتح اله كندي, also Romanized as Fatḥollah Kandī) is a village in Leylan-e Jonubi Rural District, Leylan District, Malekan County, East Azerbaijan Province, Iran. At the 2006 census, its population was 201, in 49 families.
