= Gugar Chinlu =

Gugar Chinlu گوگرچين لو
- Village
- Location within Iran
- Coordinates: 37°13′54″N 47°41′29″E
- Country: Iran
- Province: East Azerbaijan
- County: Meyaneh
- Bakhsh: Central
- Rural District: Qezel Uzan

Population (2006)
  - Total: 92
- Time zone: UTC+3:30 (IRST)
  - Summer (DST): UTC+4:30 (IRDT)

Gugar Chinlu (Persian: گوگرچين لو, also Romanized as Gūgar Chīnlū; also known as Gūgar Jīnlū and Gūvar Chīnlū) is a village in Qezel Uzan Rural District, in the Central District of Meyaneh County, East Azerbaijan Province, Iran. At the 2006 census, its total population consisted of 92 people within 17 families.
