= Avindin =

Avindin اويندين
- Village
- Location within Iran
- Coordinates: 38°45′13″N 45°53′34″E
- Country: Iran
- Province: East Azerbaijan
- County: Marand
- Bakhsh: Central
- Rural District: Harzandat-e Sharqi

Population (2006)
  - Total: 308
- Time zone: UTC+3:30 (IRST)
  - Summer (DST): UTC+4:30 (IRDT)

Avindin (Persian: اويندين, also Romanized as Avīndīn; also known as Avendīn) is a village in Harzandat-e Sharqi Rural District, in the Central District of Marand County, East Azerbaijan Province, Iran. At the 2006 census, its population was 308, in 89 families.
