= Mizab =

Mizab ميزاب
- Village
- Location within Iran
- Coordinates: 38°41′21″N 45°47′59″E
- Country: Iran
- Province: East Azerbaijan
- County: Marand
- Bakhsh: Central
- Rural District: Harzandat-e Sharqi

Population (2011)
  - Total: 231
- Time zone: UTC+3:30 (IRST)
  - Summer (DST): UTC+4:30 (IRDT)

Mizab (Persian: ميزاب, also Romanized as Mīzāb) is a village in Harzandat-e Sharqi Rural District, in the Central District of Marand County, East Azerbaijan province, Iran. At the 2011 census, its population was 231, in 75 families.
