= Guneh Qarshu =

Guneh Qarshu گونه قارشو
- Village
- Location within Iran
- Coordinates: 37°01′57″N 47°10′45″E
- Country: Iran
- Province: East Azerbaijan
- County: Charuymaq
- Bakhsh: Shadian
- Rural District: Charuymaq-e Jonubesharqi

Population (2006)
  - Total: 53
- Time zone: UTC+3:30 (IRST)
  - Summer (DST): UTC+4:30 (IRDT)

Guneh Qarshu (Persian: گونه قارشو, also Romanized as Gūneh Qārshū) is a village in Charuymaq-e Jonubesharqi Rural District, Shadian District, Charuymaq County, East Azerbaijan Province, Iran. At the 2006 census, its population was 53, in 11 families.
