= Kalkin =

Kaleybar کلیبر
- village
- Country: Iran
- Province: East Azerbaijan
- County: Kaleybar
- Bakhsh: Central
- Rural District: Yeylaq

Population (2006)
  - Total: 17
- Time zone: UTC+3:30 (IRST)
  - Summer (DST): UTC+4:30 (IRDT)

Kaleybar (Persian: كلیبر, also Romanized as Kaleybar) is a village in Yeylaq Rural District, in the Central District of Kaleybar County, East Azerbaijan province, Iran. At the 2006 census, its population was 17, in 6 families.
