= Ababin =

Ababin ابابين
- Village
- Location within Iran
- Coordinates: 37°22′13″N 48°08′16″E
- Country: Iran
- Province: East Azerbaijan
- County: Meyaneh
- Bakhsh: Kaghazkonan
- Rural District: Kaghazkonan-e Shomali

Population (2006)
  - Total: 71
- Time zone: UTC+3:30 (IRST)
  - Summer (DST): UTC+4:30 (IRDT)

Ababin (Persian: ابابين, also Romanized as Abābīn; also known as Ababi and Abājīn) is a village in Kaghazkonan-e Shomali Rural District, Kaghazkonan District, Meyaneh County, East Azerbaijan province, Iran. At the 2006 census, its population was 71, in 29 families.
