= Chubanlar =

Chubanlar چوبانلار
- Village
- Location within Iran
- Coordinates: 38°36′01″N 47°09′36″E
- Country: Iran
- Province: East Azerbaijan
- County: Ahar
- Bakhsh: Central
- Rural District: Owch Hacha

Population (2006)
  - Total: 84
- Time zone: UTC+3:30 (IRST)
  - Summer (DST): UTC+4:30 (IRDT)

Chubanlar (Persian: چوبانلار, also Romanized as Chūbānlār; also known as Chūpānlār and Chūpānlār-e Ḩoseynkalū) is a village in Owch Hacha Rural District, in the Central District of Ahar County, East Azerbaijan Province, Iran. At the 2006 census, its population was 84, in 17 families.
