= Cheshmeqan =

Cheshmeqan چشمقان
- Village
- Location within Iran
- Coordinates: 38°44′42″N 46°24′50″E
- Country: Iran
- Province: East Azerbaijan
- County: Varzaqan
- Bakhsh: Kharvana
- Rural District: Jushin

Population (2006)
  - Total: 10
- Time zone: UTC+3:30 (IRST)
  - Summer (DST): UTC+4:30 (IRDT)

Cheshmeqan (Persian: چشمقان, also Romanized as Cheshmeqān, Chashmaqān, and Cheshmaqān; also known as Chashmaghan, Chasmaqān, Chechmukhan, Cheshmagān, Cheshmeshān, and Chishmushan) is a village in Jushin Rural District, Kharvana District, Varzaqan County, East Azerbaijan Province, Iran. At the 2006 census, its population was 10, in 4 families.
