= Ozumchi =

Ozumchi ازومچي
- Village
- Location within Iran
- Coordinates: 37°39′11″N 47°11′29″E
- Country: Iran
- Province: East Azerbaijan
- County: Bostanabad
- Bakhsh: Tekmeh Dash
- Rural District: Abbas-e Sharqi

Population (2006)
  - Total: 149
- Time zone: UTC+3:30 (IRST)
  - Summer (DST): UTC+4:30 (IRDT)

Ozumchi (Persian: ازومچي, also Romanized as Ozūmchī; also known as Owzūmchī and Ūzūmchī) is a village in Abbas-e Sharqi Rural District, Tekmeh Dash District, Bostanabad County, East Azerbaijan Province, Iran. As of the 2006 census, its population was 149, in 40 families.
