= Gerdah Sang =

Gerdah Sang گرده سنگ
- Village
- Location within Iran
- Coordinates: 38°37′21″N 47°13′31″E
- Country: Iran
- Province: East Azerbaijan
- County: Ahar
- Bakhsh: Central
- Rural District: Vargahan

Population (2006)
  - Total: 72
- Time zone: UTC+3:30 (IRST)
  - Summer (DST): UTC+4:30 (IRDT)

Gerdah Sang (Persian: گرده سنگ) is a village in Vargahan Rural District, in the Central District of Ahar County, East Azerbaijan Province, Iran. At the 2006 census, its population was 72, in 13 families.
