= Mohammad Hasanlu =

Mohammad Hasanlu محمدحسنلو
- Village
- Location within Iran
- Coordinates: 39°05′24″N 47°12′33″E
- Country: Iran
- Province: East Azerbaijan
- County: Kaleybar
- Bakhsh: Central
- Rural District: Mulan

Population (2006)
  - Total: 120
- Time zone: UTC+3:30 (IRST)
  - Summer (DST): UTC+4:30 (IRDT)

Mohammad Hasanlu (Persian: محمدحسنلو, also Romanized as Moḩammad Ḩasanlū; also known as Moḩammad Ḩasanī) is a village in Mulan Rural District, in the Central District of Kaleybar County, East Azerbaijan Province, Iran. At the 2006 census, its population was 120, in 23 families.
