= Burun Daraq =

Burun Daraq بورون درق
- Village
- Location within Iran
- Coordinates: 38°24′46″N 46°30′53″E
- Country: Iran
- Province: East Azerbaijan
- County: Varzaqan
- Bakhsh: Central
- Rural District: Sina

Population (2006)
  - Total: 47
- Time zone: UTC+3:30 (IRST)
  - Summer (DST): UTC+4:30 (IRDT)

Burun Daraq (Persian: بورون درق, also Romanized as Būrūn Daraq; also known as Bīrūn Daraq, Borūn Daraq, Burun-Dara, and Būrūn Darreh) is a village in Sina Rural District, in the Central District of Varzaqan County, East Azerbaijan Province, Iran. At the 2006 census, its population was 47, in 7 families.
