= Qezel Dagh =

Qezel Dagh قزل داغ
- Village
- Location within Iran
- Coordinates: 37°15′50″N 46°52′53″E
- Country: Iran
- Province: East Azerbaijan
- County: Charuymaq
- Bakhsh: Central
- Rural District: Charuymaq-e Markazi

Population (2006)
  - Total: 197
- Time zone: UTC+3:30 (IRST)
  - Summer (DST): UTC+4:30 (IRDT)

Qezel Dagh (Persian: قزل داغ, also Romanized as Qezel Dāgh; also known as Qezel Dāghī) is a village in Charuymaq-e Markazi Rural District, in the Central District of Charuymaq County, East Azerbaijan Province, Iran. At the 2006 census, its population was 197, in 43 families.
