= Qavaq Amular =

Qavaq Amular قواق عمولر
- Village
- Location within Iran
- Coordinates: 37°18′22″N 47°46′31″E
- Country: Iran
- Province: East Azerbaijan
- County: Meyaneh
- Bakhsh: Central
- Rural District: Qaflankuh-e Gharbi

Population (2006)
  - Total: 85
- Time zone: UTC+3:30 (IRST)
  - Summer (DST): UTC+4:30 (IRDT)

Qavaq Amular (Persian: قواق عمولر, also Romanized as Qavāq ‘Amūlar) is a village in Qaflankuh-e Gharbi Rural District, in the Central District of Meyaneh County, East Azerbaijan Province, Iran. At the 2006 census, its population was 85, in 20 families.
