= Huliq =

Huliq هوليق
- village
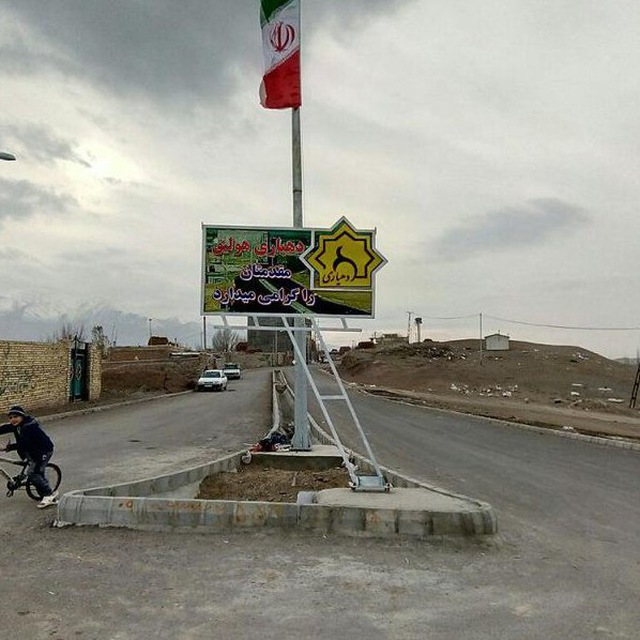

- Location within Iran
- Coordinates: 37°51′03″N 47°33′26″E
- Country: Iran
- Province: East Azerbaijan
- County: Sarab
- Bakhsh: Central
- Rural District: Howmeh

Population (2006)
  - Total: 276
- Time zone: UTC+3:30 (IRST)
  - Summer (DST): UTC+4:30 (IRDT)

Huliq (Persian: هوليق, also Romanized as Hūlīq) is a village in Howmeh Rural District, in the Central District of Sarab County, East Azerbaijan Province, Iran. At the 2006 census, its population was 276, in 67 families.
