= Bayanlucheh =

Bayanlucheh بيانلوچه
- Village
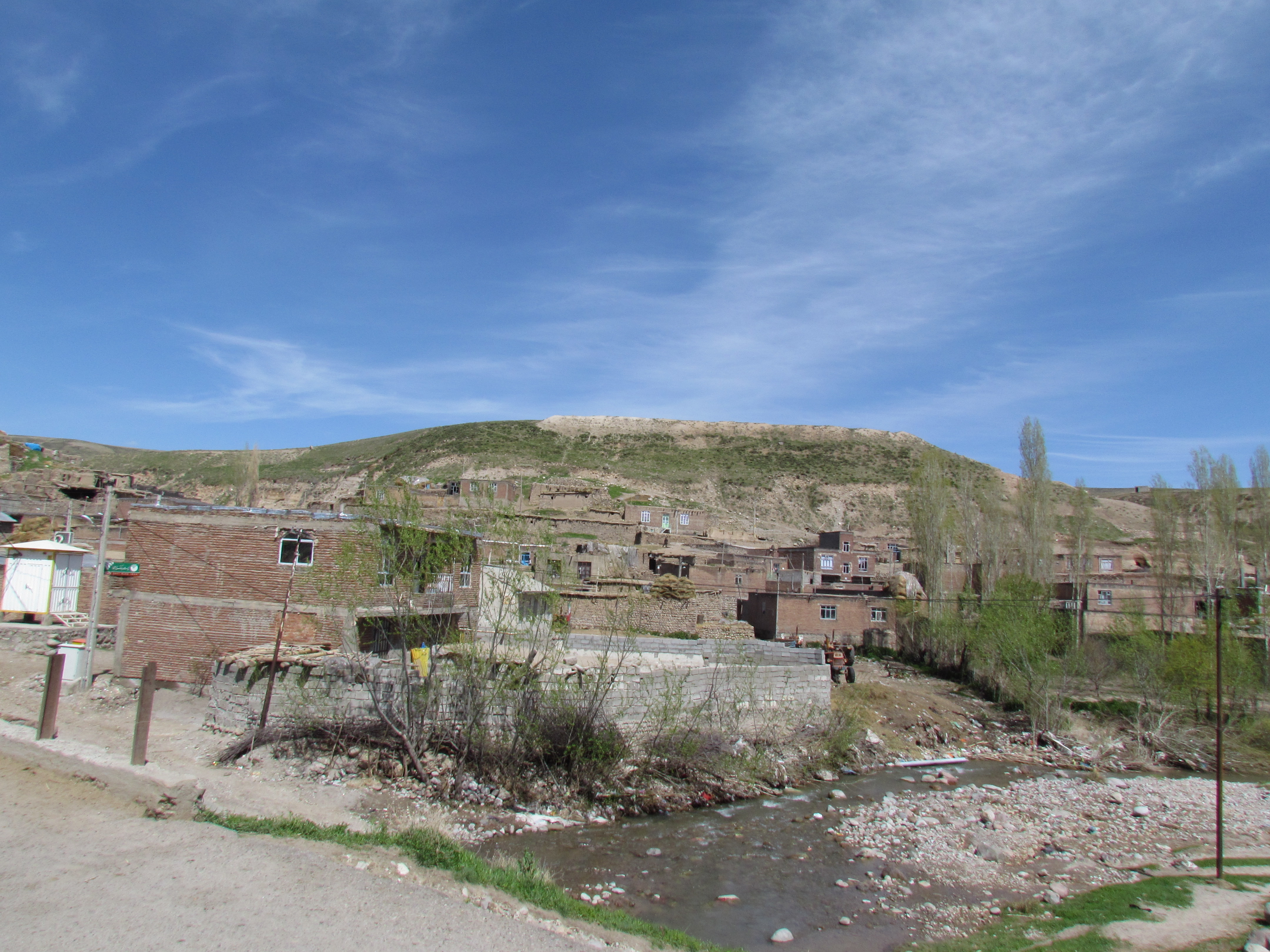

- Location within Iran
- Coordinates: 37°26′52″N 46°31′19″E
- Country: Iran
- Province: East Azerbaijan
- County: Maragheh
- Bakhsh: Saraju
- Rural District: Sarajuy-ye Sharqi

Population (2006)
  - Total: 399
- Time zone: UTC+3:30 (IRST)
  - Summer (DST): UTC+4:30 (IRDT)

Bayanlucheh (Persian: بيانلوچه, also Romanized as Bayānlūcheh; also known as Bayānlūjeh) is a village in Sarajuy-ye Sharqi Rural District, Saraju District, Maragheh County, East Azerbaijan Province, Iran. At the 2006 census, its population was 399, in 59 families.

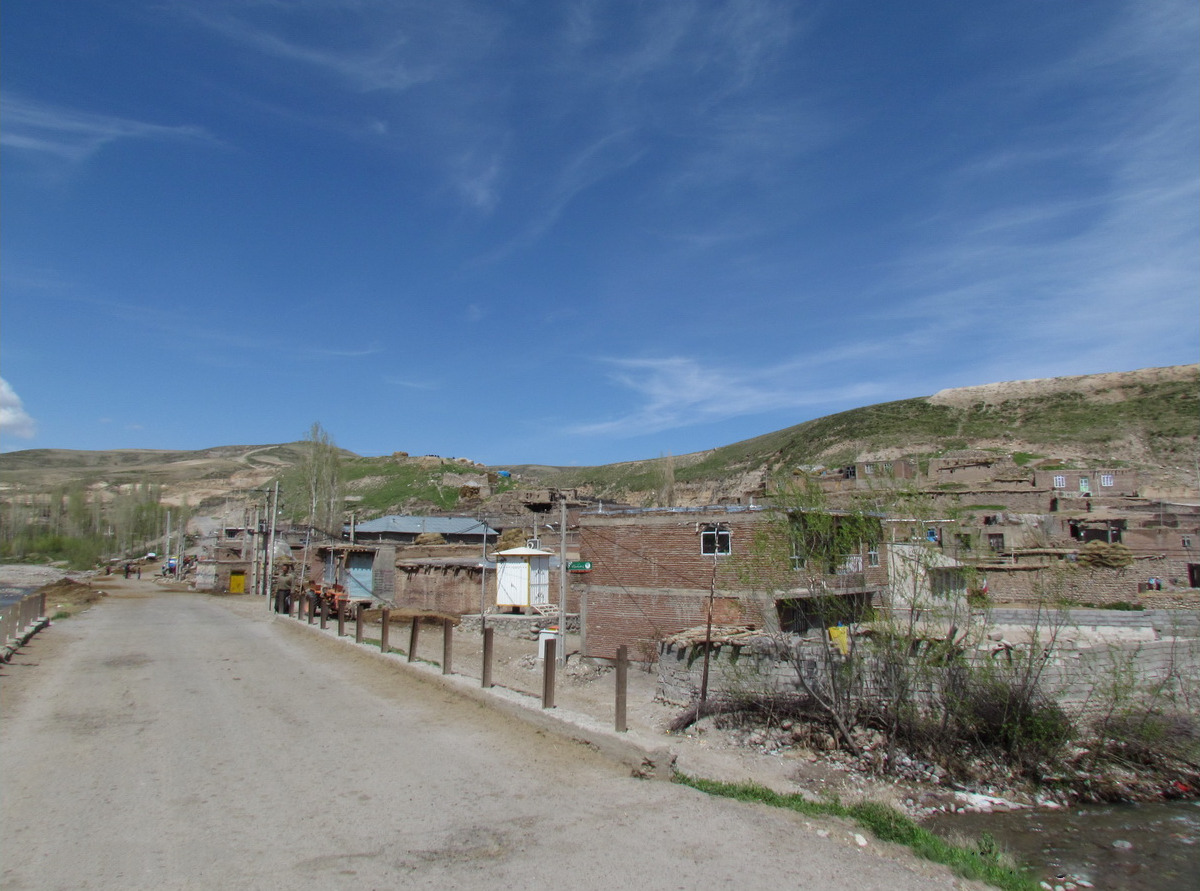
A street in the village
