= Vanehabad =

Vanehabad ونه اباد
- Village
- Location within Iran
- Coordinates: 38°33′28″N 47°08′06″E
- Country: Iran
- Province: East Azerbaijan
- County: Ahar
- Bakhsh: Central
- Rural District: Owch Hacha

Population (2006)
  - Total: 152
- Time zone: UTC+3:30 (IRST)
  - Summer (DST): UTC+4:30 (IRDT)

Vanehabad (Persian: ونه اباد, also Romanized as Vanehābād) is a village in Owch Hacha Rural District, in the Central District of Ahar County, East Azerbaijan Province, Iran. At the 2006 census, its population was 152, in 37 families.
