= Sendan =

Sendan سندان
- Village
- Location within Iran
- Coordinates: 37°58′31″N 47°35′25″E
- Country: Iran
- Province: East Azerbaijan
- County: Sarab
- Bakhsh: Central
- Rural District: Aghmiyun

Population (2006)
  - Total: 389
- Time zone: UTC+3:30 (IRST)
  - Summer (DST): UTC+4:30 (IRDT)

Sendan (Persian: سندان, also Romanized as Sendān) is a village in Aghmiyun Rural District, in the Central District of Sarab County, East Azerbaijan Province, Iran. At the 2006 census, its population was 389, in 101 families.
