= Qayeh Qeshlaq =

Qayeh Qeshlaq قيه قشلاق
- Village
- Location within Iran
- Coordinates: 38°36′20″N 46°40′43″E
- Country: Iran
- Province: East Azerbaijan
- County: Varzaqan
- Bakhsh: Central
- Rural District: Bakrabad

Population (2006)
  - Total: 65
- Time zone: UTC+3:30 (IRST)
  - Summer (DST): UTC+4:30 (IRDT)

Qayeh Qeshlaq (Persian: قيه قشلاق, also Romanized as Qayeh Qeshlāq) is a village in Bakrabad Rural District, in the Central District of Varzaqan County, East Azerbaijan Province, Iran. At the 2006 census, its population was 65, in 15 families.
