= Khvoshganab =

Khvoshganab خوشگناب
- Village
- Location within Iran
- Coordinates: 38°13′59″N 47°12′09″E
- Country: Iran
- Province: East Azerbaijan
- County: Heris
- Bakhsh: Central
- Rural District: Khanamrud

Population (2006)
  - Total: 265
- Time zone: UTC+3:30 (IRST)
  - Summer (DST): UTC+4:30 (IRDT)

Khvoshganab (Persian: خوشگناب, also Romanized as Khvoshganāb and Khvoshgnāb; also known as Khoshgnāb) is a village in Khanamrud Rural District, in the Central District of Heris County, East Azerbaijan Province, Iran. At the 2006 census, its population was 265, in 65 families.
