= Angoshtjan =

Angoshtjan انگشت جان
- Village
- Location within Iran
- Coordinates: 38°21′44″N 45°21′40″E
- Country: Iran
- Province: East Azerbaijan
- County: Shabestar
- Bakhsh: Tasuj
- Rural District: Chehregan

Population (2006)
  - Total: 213
- Time zone: UTC+3:30 (IRST)
  - Summer (DST): UTC+4:30 (IRDT)

Angoshtjan (Persian: انگشت جان, also Romanized as Angoshtjān and Angoshtejān; also known as Angeshtavān, Angestevān, Angistavan, and Angoshtevān) is a village in Chehregan Rural District, Tasuj District, Shabestar County, East Azerbaijan Province, Iran. At the 2006 census, its population was 213, in 53 families.
