= Khormalu =

Khormalu خرمالو
- Village
- Location within Iran
- Coordinates: 38°16′39″N 46°49′43″E
- Country: Iran
- Province: East Azerbaijan
- County: Heris
- Bakhsh: Khvajeh
- Rural District: Bedevostan-e Gharbi

Population (2006)
  - Total: 714
- Time zone: UTC+3:30 (IRST)
  - Summer (DST): UTC+4:30 (IRDT)

Khormalu (Persian: خرمالو, also Romanized as Khormālū; also known as Khormālī and Khūrmali) is a village in Bedevostan-e Gharbi Rural District, Khvajeh District, Heris County, East Azerbaijan Province, Iran. At the 2006 census, its population was 714, in 148 families.
