= Mameh Shir =

Mameh Shir ممه شير
- Village
- Location within Iran
- Coordinates: 37°13′24″N 46°20′44″E
- Country: Iran
- Province: East Azerbaijan
- County: Maragheh
- Bakhsh: Saraju
- Rural District: Sarajuy-ye Jonubi

Population (2006)
  - Total: 41
- Time zone: UTC+3:30 (IRST)
  - Summer (DST): UTC+4:30 (IRDT)

Mameh Shir (Persian: ممه شير, also Romanized as Mameh Shīr) is a village in Sarajuy-ye Jonubi Rural District, Saraju District, Maragheh County, East Azerbaijan Province, Iran. At the 2006 census, its population was 41, in 6 families.
