= Barzandiq =

Barzandiq برزنديق
- Village
- Location within Iran
- Coordinates: 38°47′01″N 46°56′42″E
- Country: Iran
- Province: East Azerbaijan
- County: Kaleybar
- Bakhsh: Central
- Rural District: Misheh Pareh

Population (2006)
  - Total: 195
- Time zone: UTC+3:30 (IRST)
  - Summer (DST): UTC+4:30 (IRDT)

Barzandiq (Persian: برزنديق, also Romanized as Barzandīq; also known as Barzynd) is a village in Misheh Pareh Rural District, in the Central District of Kaleybar County, East Azerbaijan Province, Iran. At the 2006 census, its population was 195, in 35 families.
