= Ravadanaq =

Ravadanaq روادانق
- Village
- Location within Iran
- Coordinates: 38°35′42″N 46°35′09″E
- Country: Iran
- Province: East Azerbaijan
- County: Varzaqan
- Bakhsh: Central
- Rural District: Ozomdel-e Jonubi

Population (2006)
  - Total: 186
- Time zone: UTC+3:30 (IRST)
  - Summer (DST): UTC+4:30 (IRDT)

Ravadanaq (Persian: روادانق, also Romanized as Ravādānaq; also known as Iravadāna, Ravārānaq, and Rovādānaq) is a village in Ozomdel-e Jonubi Rural District, in the Central District of Varzaqan County, East Azerbaijan Province, Iran. At the 2006 census, its population was 186, in 40 families.
