= Molla Yaqub =

Molla Yaqub ملايعقوب
- Village
- Location within Iran
- Coordinates: 37°52′17″N 47°42′04″E
- Country: Iran
- Province: East Azerbaijan
- County: Sarab
- Bakhsh: Central
- Rural District: Molla Yaqub

Population (2006)
  - Total: 193
- Time zone: UTC+3:30 (IRST)
  - Summer (DST): UTC+4:30 (IRDT)

Molla Yaqub (Persian: ملايعقوب, also Romanized as Mollā Ya‘qūb) is a village in Molla Yaqub Rural District, in the Central District of Sarab County, East Azerbaijan Province, Iran. At the 2006 census, its population was 193, in 46 families.
