= Dish Gadugi =

Dish Gadugi ديشگدوگي
- Village
- Location within Iran
- Coordinates: 38°48′03″N 46°40′02″E
- Country: Iran
- Province: East Azerbaijan
- County: Khoda Afarin
- Bakhsh: Minjavan
- Rural District: Dizmar-e Sharqi

Population (2006)
  - Total: 51
- Time zone: UTC+3:30 (IRST)
  - Summer (DST): UTC+4:30 (IRDT)

Dish Gadugi (Persian: ديشگدوگي, also Romanized as Dīsh Gadūgī; also known as Dīsh Gadīg, Dīshgadākī, Dīsh Gadūkī, Dīsh Kadūgī, Dīsh Kand, and Dishkyand) is a village in Dizmar-e Sharqi Rural District, Minjavan District, Khoda Afarin County, East Azerbaijan Province, Iran. At the 2006 census, its population was 51, in 9 families.
