= Bala Sang =

Bala Sang بالاسنگ
- Village
- Location within Iran
- Coordinates: 38°55′01″N 46°57′26″E
- Country: Iran
- Province: East Azerbaijan
- County: Kaleybar
- Bakhsh: Central
- Rural District: Misheh Pareh

Population (2006)
  - Total: 34
- Time zone: UTC+3:30 (IRST)
  - Summer (DST): UTC+4:30 (IRDT)

Bala Sang (Persian: بالاسنگ, also Romanized as Bālā Sang; also known as Balasa) is a village in Misheh Pareh Rural District, in the Central District of Kaleybar County, East Azerbaijan Province, Iran. At the 2006 census, its population was 34, in 8 families.
