= Aghaj Ughli =

Aghaj Ughli اغاج اوغلي
- Village
- Location within Iran
- Coordinates: 38°18′11″N 46°24′00″E
- Country: Iran
- Province: East Azerbaijan
- County: Tabriz
- Bakhsh: Central
- Rural District: Esperan

Population (2006)
  - Total: 238
- Time zone: UTC+3:30 (IRST)
  - Summer (DST): UTC+4:30 (IRDT)

Aghaj Ughli (Persian: اغاج اوغلي, also Romanized as Āghāj Ūghlī and Āghāj Owghlū; also known as Agadzhagly, Aghajaglil, Āghāj Oghlū, Āghāj Owghlī, Āghāj Ūqlī, and Āqājolī) is a village in Esperan Rural District, in the Central District of Tabriz County, East Azerbaijan Province, Iran. At the 2006 census, its population was 238, in 62 families.
