= Eshaqlu =

Eshaqlu ايشقلو
- Village
- Location within Iran
- Coordinates: 38°25′55″N 46°34′11″E
- Country: Iran
- Province: East Azerbaijan
- County: Varzaqan
- Bakhsh: Central
- Rural District: Ozomdel-e Jonubi

Population (2006)
  - Total: 41
- Time zone: UTC+3:30 (IRST)
  - Summer (DST): UTC+4:30 (IRDT)

Eshaqlu (Persian: ايشقلو, also Romanized as Eshaqlū and Esheqlū; also known as Ashghaloo, Īshaqlū, and Ishikhli) is a village in Ozomdel-e Jonubi Rural District, in the Central District of Varzaqan County, East Azerbaijan Province, Iran. At the 2006 census, its population was 41, in 5 families.
