= Ebrahim Beyglu =

Ebrahim Beyglu ابراهيم بيگلو
- Village
- Location within Iran
- Coordinates: 38°55′43″N 46°42′39″E
- Country: Iran
- Province: East Azerbaijan
- County: Khoda Afarin
- Bakhsh: Minjavan
- Rural District: Minjavan-e Gharbi

Population (2006)
  - Total: 73
- Time zone: UTC+3:30 (IRST)
  - Summer (DST): UTC+4:30 (IRDT)

Ebrahim Beyglu (Persian: ابراهيم بيگلو, also Romanized as Ebrāhīm Beyglū) is a village in Minjavan-e Gharbi Rural District, Minjavan District, Khoda Afarin County, East Azerbaijan Province, Iran. At the 2006 census, its population was 73, in 14 families.
