= Aq Dagh-e Olya =

Aq Dagh-e Olya اق داغ عليا
- Village
- Location within Iran
- Coordinates: 37°21′32″N 47°01′24″E
- Country: Iran
- Province: East Azerbaijan
- County: Hashtrud
- Bakhsh: Central
- Rural District: Qaranqu

Population (2006)
  - Total: 109
- Time zone: UTC+3:30 (IRST)
  - Summer (DST): UTC+4:30 (IRDT)

Aq Dagh-e Olya (Persian: اق داغ عليا, also Romanized as Āq Dāgh-e ‘Olyā; also known as Āgh Dāgh Kūh, Āqdāgh-e Bālā and Āqdāgh Rūd) is a village in Qaranqu Rural District, in the Central District of Hashtrud County, East Azerbaijan Province, Iran. At the 2006 census, its population was 109, in 21 families.
