= Surna Kahel =

Surna Kahel سورناكهل
- Village
- Country: Iran
- Province: East Azerbaijan
- County: Meyaneh
- Bakhsh: Central
- Rural District: Garmeh-ye Jonubi

Population (2006)
  - Total: 86
- Time zone: UTC+3:30 (IRST)
  - Summer (DST): UTC+4:30 (IRDT)

Surna Kahel (Persian: سورناكهل, also Romanized as Sūrnā Kahel) is a village in Garmeh-ye Jonubi Rural District, in the Central District of Meyaneh County, East Azerbaijan Province, Iran. At the 2006 census, its population was 86, in 18 families.
