= Sheykh Boran =

Sheykh Boran شيخ بران
- Village
- Location within Iran
- Coordinates: 38°58′51″N 47°21′07″E
- Country: Iran
- Province: East Azerbaijan
- County: Ahar
- Bakhsh: Hurand
- Rural District: Chahardangeh

Population (2006)
  - Total: 51
- Time zone: UTC+3:30 (IRST)
  - Summer (DST): UTC+4:30 (IRDT)

Sheykh Boran (Persian: شيخ بران, also Romanized as Sheykh Borān) is a village in Chahardangeh Rural District, Hurand District, Ahar County, East Azerbaijan Province, Iran. At the 2006 census, its population was 51, in 13 families.
