= Saraskand-e Sofla =

Saraskand-e Sofla سراسكندسفلي
- Village
- Location within Iran
- Coordinates: 37°32′08″N 46°38′37″E
- Country: Iran
- Province: East Azerbaijan
- County: Hashtrud
- Bakhsh: Nazarkahrizi
- Rural District: Almalu

Population (2006)
  - Total: 210
- Time zone: UTC+3:30 (IRST)
  - Summer (DST): UTC+4:30 (IRDT)

Saraskand-e Sofla (Persian: سراسكندسفلي, also Romanized as Sarāskand-e Soflá; also known as Āzarān-e Pā’īn, Sarāskand-e Pā’īn, and Sareskand-e Pā’īn) is a village in Almalu Rural District, Nazarkahrizi District, Hashtrud County, East Azerbaijan Province, Iran. At the 2006 census, its population was 210, in 35 families.
