= Qush Bolagh =

Qush Bolagh قوش بلاغ
- Village
- Location within Iran
- Coordinates: 37°05′25″N 46°21′19″E
- Country: Iran
- Province: East Azerbaijan
- County: Malekan
- Bakhsh: Leylan
- Rural District: Leylan-e Shomali

Population (2006)
  - Total: 88
- Time zone: UTC+3:30 (IRST)
  - Summer (DST): UTC+4:30 (IRDT)

Qush Bolagh (Persian: قوش بلاغ, also Romanized as Qūsh Bolāgh) is a village in Leylan-e Shomali Rural District, Leylan District, Malekan County, East Azerbaijan Province, Iran. At the 2006 census, its population was 88, in 19 families.
