= Khak Vanaq =

Khak Vanaq خاكوانق
- Village
- Location within Iran
- Coordinates: 38°39′39″N 46°32′38″E
- Country: Iran
- Province: East Azerbaijan
- County: Varzaqan
- Bakhsh: Central
- Rural District: Sina

Population (2006)
  - Total: 113
- Time zone: UTC+3:30 (IRST)
  - Summer (DST): UTC+4:30 (IRDT)

Khak Vanaq (Persian: خاكوانق, also Romanized as Khāk Vānaq and Khākvānaq; also known as Khāyfānā, Haifona, Hāyfoneh, Ḩeyf Ūnā, and Khayfana) is a village in Sina Rural District, in the Central District of Varzaqan County, East Azerbaijan Province, Iran. At the 2006 census, its population was 113, in 19 families.
