= Arbatan, Nakhchivan =

Arbatan
- Municipality
- Location within Azerbaijan
- Coordinates: 39°31′N 44°58′E
- Country: Azerbaijan
- Autonomous republic: Nakhchivan
- District: Sharur

Population (2005)
  - Total: 731
- Time zone: UTC+4 (AZT)

Arbatan (also, Arbat) is a village and municipality in the Sharur District of Nakhchivan Autonomous Republic, Azerbaijan. It is located on the right bank of the Arpachay River. Its population is busy with grain-growing, vegetable-growing, farming, animal husbandry. There are secondary school, club, library, a medical center and domestic and commercial facilities in the village. It has a population of 731.

== Etymology ==
Arbatan - the name means "the plain, gravel". In the toponomy of Turkic-speaking countries (Azerbaijan, Turkey, Kazakhstan, Kyrgyzstan, Uzbekistan, Turkmenistan), Arba (t) is using in meaning as a geographic term "shallow, shallow place", "the plain", "sand, clay and the land area from the gravel". Some researchers say that the name is associated with the Arabic word of Rabat (caravanserai, mosques, guest house etc.).
