= Pirasmillu =

Pirasmillu پيراسميلو
- Village
- Location within Iran
- Coordinates: 38°59′56″N 47°20′08″E
- Country: Iran
- Province: East Azerbaijan
- County: Ahar
- Bakhsh: Hurand
- Rural District: Chahardangeh

Population (2006)
  - Total: 117
- Time zone: UTC+3:30 (IRST)
  - Summer (DST): UTC+4:30 (IRDT)

Pirasmillu (Persian: پيراسميلو, also Romanized as Pīrāsmīllū; also known as Perūs Mūl and Pīrāsmellū) is a village in Chahardangeh Rural District, Hurand District, Ahar County, East Azerbaijan Province, Iran. At the 2006 census, its population was 117, in 26 families.
