= Toghay =

Toghay طغاي
- Village
- Location within Iran
- Coordinates: 37°12′40″N 47°44′15″E
- Country: Iran
- Province: East Azerbaijan
- County: Meyaneh
- Bakhsh: Central
- Rural District: Qezel Uzan

Population (2006)
  - Total: 124
- Time zone: UTC+3:30 (IRST)
  - Summer (DST): UTC+4:30 (IRDT)

Toghay (Persian: طغاي, also Romanized as Toghāy and Ţoghāy) is a village in Qezel Uzan Rural District, in the Central District of Meyaneh County, East Azerbaijan Province, Iran. At the 2006 census, its population was 124, in 25 families.
