= Qeshlaq-e Sowmeeh =

Qeshlaq-e Sowmeeh قشلاق صومعه
- Village
- Location within Iran
- Coordinates: 39°13′43″N 47°16′09″E
- Country: Iran
- Province: East Azerbaijan
- County: Kaleybar
- Bakhsh: Abish Ahmad
- Rural District: Qeshlaq

Population (2006)
  - Total: 215
- Time zone: UTC+3:30 (IRST)
  - Summer (DST): UTC+4:30 (IRDT)

Qeshlaq-e Sowmeeh (Persian: قشلاق صومعه, also Romanized as Qeshlāq-e Şowme‘eh) is a village in Qeshlaq Rural District, Abish Ahmad District, Kaleybar County, East Azerbaijan Province, Iran. At the 2006 census, its population was 215, in 42 families.
