= Mirza Beyg Kandi =

Mirza Beyg Kandi ميررزابيگ كندي
- Village
- Location within Iran
- Coordinates: 37°10′38″N 47°01′10″E
- Country: Iran
- Province: East Azerbaijan
- County: Charuymaq
- Bakhsh: Central
- Rural District: Charuymaq-e Markazi

Population (2006)
  - Total: 75
- Time zone: UTC+3:30 (IRST)
  - Summer (DST): UTC+4:30 (IRDT)

Mirza Beyg Kandi (Persian: ميررزابيگ كندي, also Romanized as Mīrzā Beyg Kandī) is a village in Charuymaq-e Markazi Rural District, in the Central District of Charuymaq County, East Azerbaijan Province, Iran. At the 2006 census, its population was 75, in 13 families.
