= Tazeh Kand =

Tazeh Kand or Tazekhkend (Azerbaijani for "New (literally, "Young") Village") may refer to:

== Ardabil Province ==
- Tazeh Kand-e Mohammadiyeh, a village in Ardabil County
- Tazeh Kand-e Rezaabad, a village in Ardabil County
- Tazeh Kand-e Sharifabad, a village in Ardabil County
- Tazehkand-e Chenaq, a village in Bileh Savar County
- Tazeh Kand-e Aguti, a city in Germi County
- Tazeh Kand-e Langan, a village in Germi County
- Tazeh Kand-e Muran, a village in Germi County
- Tazeh Kand-e Qarah Bolagh, a village in Germi County
- Tazeh Kand-e Galvazan, a village in Khalkhal County
- Tazeh Kand Gandomabad, a village in Khalkhal County
- Tazeh Kand, Meshgin Shahr, a village in Meshgin Shahr County
- Tazeh Kand-e Hajji Khan, a village in Meshgin Shahr County
- Tazeh Kand-e Yuzbashi, a village in Meshgin Shahr County
- Tazeh Kand, Namin, a village in Namin County
- Tazeh Kand-e Jadid, a village in Parsabad County
- Tazeh Kand-e Kian, a village in Parsabad County
- Tazeh Kand-e Qadim, a city in Parsabad County
- Tazeh Kand-e Sabalan, a village in Sareyn County
- Tazeh Kand Rural District (Parsabad County)

== East Azerbaijan Province ==
=== Ahar County ===
- Tazeh Kand-e Davudlu, a village in Ahar County
- Tazeh Kand-e Masqaran, a village in Ahar County
- Tazeh Kand-e Nasirabad, a village in Ahar County
- Tazeh Kand-e Niq, a village in Ahar County
- Tazeh Kand-e Shahverdi, a village in Ahar County
- Tazeh Kand-e Tahmasb, a village in Ahar County
- Tazeh Kand-e Yaft, a village in Ahar County

=== Bonab County ===
- Tazeh Kand-e Isa Khani, a village in Bonab County
- Tazeh Kand-e Khusheh Mehr, a village in Bonab County
- Tazeh Kand-e Zavaraq, a village in Bonab County

=== Bostanabad County ===
- Tazeh Kand, Bostanabad, a village in Bostanabad County
- Tazeh Kand, Abbas-e Gharbi, a village in Bostanabad County
- Tazeh Kand, Ujan-e Sharqi, a village in Bostanabad County

=== Charuymaq County ===
- Tazeh Kand-e Sowlati, a village in Charuymaq County

=== Hashtrud County ===
- Tazeh Kand-e Qarajeh Qayah, a village in Hashtrud County

=== Heris County ===
- Tazeh Kand, Heris, a village in Heris County
- Tazeh Kand, alternate name of Guydaraq Kandi, a village in Heris County
- Tazeh Kand-e Nahand, a village in Heris County
- Tazeh Kand-e Olya, Heris, a village in Heris County
- Tazeh Kand-e Sarand, a village in Heris County

=== Jolfa County ===
- Tazeh Kand, Jolfa, a village in Jolfa County

=== Khoda Afarin County ===
- Tazeh Kand-e Vinaq, a village in Khoda Afarin County

=== Malekan County ===
- Tazeh Kand-e Hurilar, a village in Malekan County
- Tazeh Kand-e Khan Kandi, a village in Malekan County
- Tazeh Kand-e Sheykh ol Eslam, a village in Malekan County

=== Maragheh County ===
- Tazeh Kand, Maragheh, a village in Maragheh County
- Tazeh Kand-e Aliabad, a village in Maragheh County
- Tazeh Kand-e Gol Chavan, a village in Maragheh County
- Tazeh Kand-e Nasirpur, a village in Maragheh County
- Tazeh Kand-e Olya, Maragheh, a village in Maragheh County
- Tazeh Kand-e Qarah Naz, a village in Maragheh County
- Tazeh Kand-e Sofla, a village in Maragheh County
- Tazeh Kand-e Qeshlaq, East Azerbaijan, a village in Maragheh County

=== Marand County ===
- Tazeh Kand-e Akhvond, a village in Marand County

=== Meyaneh County ===
- Tazeh Kand-e Divan Ali, a village in Meyaneh County
- Tazeh Kand-e Poruch, a village in Meyaneh County

=== Sarab County ===
- Tazeh Kand, Howmeh, a village in Sarab County
- Tazeh Kand, Sain, a village in Sarab County

=== Shabestar County ===
- Tazeh Kand, Chelleh Khaneh, a village in Shabestar County
- Tazeh Kand, Rudqat, a village in Shabestar County
- Tazeh Kand, Sis, a village in Shabestar County

=== Tabriz County ===
- Tazeh Kand, Tabriz, a village in Tabriz County
- Tazeh Kand Rural District (Tabriz County)

=== Varzaqan County ===
- Tazeh Kand, Varzaqan, a village in Varzaqan County

== Hamadan Province ==
- Tazeh Kand, Bahar, a village in Bahar County
- Tazeh Kand, alternate name of Deh Now, Bahar, a village in Bahar County
- Tazeh Kand, Hamadan, a village in Hamadan County
- Tazeh Kand, Razan, a village in Razan County
- Roderick Syme

== Kurdistan Province ==
- Tazeh Kand-e Madan, a village in Kurdistan Province

== West Azerbaijan Province ==
=== Chaldoran County ===
- Tazeh Kand, Baba Jik, a village in Chaldoran County
- Tazehkand, Chaldoran-e Shomali, a village in Chaldoran County

=== Khoy County ===
- Tazeh Kand, Khoy, a village in Khoy County

=== Maku County ===
- Tazeh Kand, Maku, a village in Maku County
- Tazeh Kand-e Adaghan, a village in Maku County
- Tazeh Kand-e Ilan Qarah, a village in Maku County
- Tazeh Kand-e Towlim Khan, a village in Maku County

=== Miandoab County ===
- Tazeh Kand, Miandoab, a village in Miandoab County
- Tazeh Kand, Baruq, a village in Miandoab County
- Tazeh Kand-e Hajj Hasan, a village in Miandoab County
- Tazeh Kand-e Hasel-e Qubi, a village in Miandoab County
- Tazeh Kand-e Lalaklu, a village in Miandoab County

=== Naqadeh County ===
- Tazeh Kand-e Deym, a village in Naqadeh County
- Tazeh Kand-e Jabal, a village in Naqadeh County

=== Poldasht County ===
- Tazehkand, Poldasht, a village in Poldasht County
- Tazehkand, Zangebar, a village in Poldasht County

=== Shahin Dezh County ===
- Tazeh Kand, Shahin Dezh, a village in Shahin Dezh County

=== Showt County ===
- Tazeh Kand, Showt, a village in Showt County

=== Takab County ===
- Tazeh Kand-e Nosratabad, a village in Takab County

=== Urmia County ===
- Tazeh Kand, Urmia, a village in Urmia County
- Tazeh Kand, Nazlu, a village in Urmia County
- Tazeh Kand, Sumay-ye Beradust, a village in Urmia County
- Tazeh Kand-e Afshar, a village in Urmia County
- Tazeh Kand-e Anhar, a village in Urmia County
- Tazeh Kand-e Baba Ganjeh, a village in Urmia County
- Tazeh Kand-e Jamalkhan, a village in Urmia County
- Tazeh Kand-e Janizeh, a village in Urmia County
- Tazeh Kand-e Qaterchi, a village in Urmia County
- Tazeh Kand-e Qeshlaq, West Azerbaijan, a village in Urmia County

== Zanjan Province ==
- Tazeh Kand, Zanjan, Iran
- Tazeh Kand, Ijrud, a village in Ijrud County
- Tazeh Kand-e Fakhrlu, a village in Mahneshan County
- Tazeh Kand, Tarom, a village in Tarom County
- Tazeh Kand-e Hasanabad, a village in Zanjan County
- Tazehkand-e Ziaabad, a village in Zanjan County

== See also ==
- Tazakend (disambiguation)
- Təzəkənd (disambiguation)
