= Təzəkənd =

Təzəkənd or Taza-Kend (Azerbaijani for "new village") may refer to:

- Təzəkənd, Agdam, Azerbaijan
- Təzəkənd, Aghjabadi, Azerbaijan
- Təzəkənd, Beylagan, Azerbaijan
- Təzəkənd, Bilasuvar (disambiguation)
  - Təzəkənd (39° 21' N 48° 35' E), Bilasuvar, Azerbaijan
  - Təzəkənd (39° 32' N 48° 24' E), Bilasuvar, Azerbaijan
- Təzəkənd, Dashkasan, Azerbaijan
- Təzəkənd, Davachi, Azerbaijan
- Təzəkənd (near Surra), Davachi, Azerbaijan
- Təzəkənd, Ismailli, Azerbaijan
- Təzəkənd, Jalilabad, Azerbaijan
- Təzəkənd, Kalbajar, Azerbaijan
- Təzəkənd, Khizi, Azerbaijan
- Təzəkənd, Lachin, Azerbaijan
- Təzəkənd, Lankaran, Azerbaijan
- Təzəkənd, Masally, Azerbaijan
- Təzəkənd, Nakhchivan (disambiguation)
  - Təzəkənd, Kangarli, Azerbaijan
  - Təzəkənd, Maxta, Azerbaijan
  - Təzəkənd, Sharur, Azerbaijan
- Təzəkənd, Salyan, Azerbaijan
- Təzəkənd, Shamkir, Azerbaijan
- Təzəkənd, Tartar, Azerbaijan
- Təzəkənd, Yardymli, Azerbaijan
- Təzəkənd, Zardab, Azerbaijan
- Taza-Kend, Iran, a village in Ardabil Province, Iran
- Tazakand, Iran, a village in Razavi Khorasan Province, Iran

== See also ==
- Tazakend (disambiguation)
- Tazeh Kand (disambiguation)
