= Tazakend =

Tazakend or T’azak’end may refer to:

== Armenia ==
- Ashotavan, Armenia
- Tasik, Armenia
- Tavshut, Armenia
- Tazagyugh, Gegharkunik, Armenia

== Azerbaijan ==
- Babek (city), Azerbaijan
- Şahsevən Təzəkənd, Azerbaijan
- Təzəkənd, Nakhchivan (disambiguation)
  - Təzəkənd, Kangarli, Azerbaijan
  - Təzəkənd, Sharur, Azerbaijan
  - Təzəkənd, Maxta, Azerbaijan
- Təzəkənd, Agdam, Azerbaijan
- Təzəkənd, Aghjabadi, Azerbaijan
- Təzəkənd, Beylagan, Azerbaijan
- Təzəkənd, Bilasuvar (disambiguation)
  - Təzəkənd (39° 21' N 48° 35' E), Bilasuvar, Azerbaijan
  - Təzəkənd (39° 32' N 48° 24' E), Bilasuvar, Azerbaijan
- Təzəkənd, Dashkasan, Azerbaijan
- Təzəkənd, Davachi, Azerbaijan
- Təzəkənd, Ismailli, Azerbaijan
- Təzəkənd, Jalilabad
  - Təzəkənd (39° 13' N 48° 18' E), Jalilabad, Azerbaijan
  - Təzəkənd (39° 20' N 48° 28' E), Jalilabad, Azerbaijan
- Təzəkənd, Lachin, Azerbaijan
- Təzəkənd, Lankaran, Azerbaijan
- Təzəkənd, Masally, Azerbaijan
- Təzəkənd, Nakhchivan (disambiguation)
  - Təzəkənd, Kangarli, Azerbaijan
  - Təzəkənd, Maxta, Azerbaijan
  - Təzəkənd, Sharur, Azerbaijan
- Təzəkənd, Salyan, Azerbaijan
- Təzəkənd, Shamkir, Azerbaijan
- Təzəkənd, Tartar
  - Təzəkənd (40° 18' N 47° 07' E), Tartar, Azerbaijan
  - Təzəkənd (40° 23' N 46° 54' E), Tartar, Azerbaijan
- Təzəkənd, Zardab, Azerbaijan

== Iran ==
- Tazeh Kand (disambiguation)

== See also ==
- Təzəkənd (disambiguation)
