= Qareh Naz =

Qareh Naz or Qarah Naz or Qarehnaz (Persian: قره ناز) may refer to:

- Qarah Naz, alternate name of Tazeh Kand-e Qarah Naz, East Azerbaijan Province
- Qareh Naz-e Olya, East Azerbaijan Province
- Qareh Naz-e Sofla, East Azerbaijan Province
- Qarah Naz, Zanjan
- Qareh Naz Rural District, in East Azerbaijan Province
