= Udullu =

Udullu may refer to the following places in Azerbaijan:

- Udullu, Shabran, a village in the Davachi Rayon
- Udullu, Hajigabul (disambiguation)

- Birinci Udullu, Azerbaijan
- İkinci Udullu, Azerbaijan
