= Chavan, Iran (disambiguation) =

Chavan, Iran is a village in East Azerbaijan Province, Iran.

Chavan (Persian: چوان) in Iran may also refer to:

- Chavan-e Alamdar
- Chavan Bagh
- Chavan-e Olya
- Chavan-e Sofla
