= Kolayır =

Kolayır or Kolair may refer to:

- Kolayır, Agstafa, Azerbaijan
- Kolayır, Barda, Azerbaijan
- Kolayır, Samukh, Azerbaijan
