= Düzqışlaq =

Düzqışlaq or Dyuz-Kyshlag or Dyuzkhshlak or Dyuzkyshlak may refer to:

- Düzqışlaq, Agstafa, Azerbaijan
- Düzqışlaq, Goranboy, Azerbaijan
- Düzqışlaq, Shamkir, Azerbaijan
