= Chakan, Iran =

Chakan (Persian: چاكان or چكن or چكان) may refer to:

- Chakan, alternate name of Chakanak, Gilan Province (چاكان - Chākān)
- Chakan, East Azerbaijan (چكن - Chakan)
- Chakan, Maragheh, East Azerbaijan Province (چكان - Chakān)
- Chakan, Lorestan (چكان - Chakān)
