= Chakan =

Chakan may refer to:

- Chakan, Maharashtra a census town in Pune district in the state of Maharashtra, India
  - Chakan Fort, Pune
- Chakan, Iran (disambiguation), places in Iran
- Chakan, Maragheh, a village in East Azerbaijan Province, Iran
- Chakan, Lorestan, a village in Iran
- Chakan, Jalal-Abad, a village in Kyrgyzstan
- Chakan (Maya province), a Maya region that existed upon the arrival of the Spanish conquerors in the Yucatán Peninsula in the 16th century
- Chakan: The Forever Man, a 1992 video game
