= Meymunaq =

Meymunaq ميمونق
- Village
- Location within Iran
- Coordinates: 37°22′57″N 46°24′31″E
- Country: Iran
- Province: East Azerbaijan
- County: Maragheh
- Bakhsh: Central
- Rural District: Sarajuy-ye Shomali

Population (2006)
  - Total: 394
- Time zone: UTC+3:30 (IRST)
  - Summer (DST): UTC+4:30 (IRDT)

Meymunaq (Persian: ميمونق, romanized: Meymūnaq) is a village in Sarajuy-ye Shomali Rural District, in the Central District of Maragheh County, East Azerbaijan province, Iran. At the 2006 census, its population was 394, in 87 families.

== Geography ==
The terrain around Meymūnaq is hilly to the north, but to the south it is flat. The highest point in the vicinity is 1,821 metres above sea level, 1.9 km north of Meymūnaq. Around Meymūnaq it is quite densely populated, with 155 inhabitants per square kilometer. The nearest major community is Marāgheh, 15.0 km west of Meymūnaq. The area around Meymūnaq is mostly farmland.

== Climate ==
A cold steppe climate prevails in the region. The average annual temperature in the region is 13 °C. The warmest month is August, when the average temperature is 30 °C, and the coldest is January, with -6 °C. average annual precipitation is 379 millimeters. The rainiest month is November, with an average of 60 mm of precipitation, and the driest is August, with 2 mm of precipitation.
