= Tazeh Kand-e Qeshlaq =

Tazeh Kand-e Qeshlaq (Persian: تازه كندقشلاق) may refer to:

- Tazeh Kand-e Qeshlaq, East Azerbaijan
- Tazeh Kand-e Qeshlaq, West Azerbaijan
