= Qeshlaq-e Amir =

Qeshlaq-e Amir قشلاق امير
- Village
- Location within Iran
- Coordinates: 37°18′16″N 46°17′36″E
- Country: Iran
- Province: East Azerbaijan
- County: Maragheh
- Bakhsh: Central
- Rural District: Qareh Naz

Population (2006)
  - Total: 44
- Time zone: UTC+3:30 (IRST)
  - Summer (DST): UTC+4:30 (IRDT)

Qeshlaq-e Amir (Persian: قشلاق امير, also Romanized as Qeshlāq-e Amīr) is a village in Qareh Naz Rural District, in the Central District of Maragheh County, East Azerbaijan Province, Iran. At the 2006 census, its population was 44, in 12 families.
