= Davah Buyoni =

Davah Buyoni دوه بويني
- Village
- Location within Iran
- Coordinates: 37°30′02″N 46°27′48″E
- Country: Iran
- Province: East Azerbaijan
- County: Maragheh
- Bakhsh: Central
- Rural District: Sarajuy-ye Shomali

Population (2006)
  - Total: 28
- Time zone: UTC+3:30 (IRST)
  - Summer (DST): UTC+4:30 (IRDT)

Davah Buyoni (Persian: دوه بوينی, also Romanized as Davah Būyonī; also known as Davah Bīnī) is a village in Sarajuy-ye Shomali Rural District, in the Central District of Maragheh County, East Azerbaijan Province, Iran. At the 2006 census, its population was 28, in 6 families.

The village was one of the most prosperous villages in the region some twenty years ago, with almost zero job-seekers, but during the Iran-Iraq war, due to lack of communication facilities and many communication problems, They were forced to migrate to the surrounding towns and provinces, leaving the village empty and declared abandoned on many maps.

But the Rasooli families decided to settle in their ancestral village in 2005 and settled permanently.

The village currently only enjoys the power of electricity and has no other amenities, communications and entertainment.

Davah Buyoni is about 300 years old, but the existence of very old caves, most of which are buried, and the existence of ancient cemeteries and the discovery of dinosaur fossils, is of great importance.

Due to the distance from the city and the lack of asphalt roads, the traffic in this village is much lower than in other villages and very clean weather can be seen in this village. Also, the proximity of the village to Sahand Mountain has caused crops such as apples, walnuts and plums to be harvested later than other villages.

The apple product of the village has a special flavor that has attracted many customers.

Kamran Rahimi, Firoozi, Rasouli, Khoshkalam and Jaafari are among the gardeners of the village.

Prior to 1991, the inhabitants were mostly agricultural and livestock farmers, but in recent years people living in the city have been selling their fertile land because of lack of government control and lack of amenities.
