= Qayeh Bolaghi =

Qayeh Bolaghi قيه بلاغي
- Village
- Location within Iran
- Coordinates: 37°25′13″N 46°27′30″E
- Country: Iran
- Province: East Azerbaijan
- County: Maragheh
- Bakhsh: Central
- Rural District: Sarajuy-ye Shomali

Population (2006)
  - Total: 468
- Time zone: UTC+3:30 (IRST)
  - Summer (DST): UTC+4:30 (IRDT)

Qayeh Bolaghi (Persian: قيه بلاغي, also Romanized as Qayeh Bolāghī; also known as Kia Bulaq, Kiya Bulāq, and Qayeh Bolāgh) is a village in Sarajuy-ye Shomali Rural District, in the Central District of Maragheh County, East Azerbaijan Province, Iran. At the 2006 census, its population was 468, in 85 families.
