= Kohlan =

Kohlan كهلان
- Village
- Location within Iran
- Coordinates: 37°26′27″N 46°27′18″E
- Country: Iran
- Province: East Azerbaijan
- County: Maragheh
- Bakhsh: Central
- Rural District: Sarajuy-ye Shomali

Population (2006)
  - Total: 423
- Time zone: UTC+3:30 (IRST)
  - Summer (DST): UTC+4:30 (IRDT)

Kohlan (Persian: كهلان, romanized: Kohlān) is a village in Sarajuy-ye Shomali Rural District, in the Central District of Maragheh County, East Azerbaijan Province, Iran. At the 2006 census, its population was 423, in 99 families.
