= Dash Atan =

Dash Atan (Persian: داش اتان) may refer to:

- Dash Atan, Bostanabad
- Dash Atan, Maragheh
