= Esfestanaj =

Esfestanaj اسفستانج
- Village
- Location within Iran
- Coordinates: 37°26′55″N 46°14′34″E
- Country: Iran
- Province: East Azerbaijan
- County: Maragheh
- Bakhsh: Central
- Rural District: Sarajuy-ye Gharbi

Population (2006)
  - Total: 500
- Time zone: UTC+3:30 (IRST)
  - Summer (DST): UTC+4:30 (IRDT)

Esfestanaj (Persian: اسفستانج, also Romanized as Esfestānaj, Esfestānej, and Esfestānj; also known as Espestana and Yespestana) is a village in Sarajuy-ye Gharbi Rural District, in the Central District of Maragheh County, East Azerbaijan Province, Iran. At the 2006 census, its population was 500, in 115 families.
