= Alov =

Alov may refer to:

- Alov (surname)
- Alov, Iran, a village in Ardabil Province, Iran
- Alov Kandi, a village in Sarajuy-ye Shomali District, Iran
