= Chay Baghi =

Chay Baghi چای باغی
- Village
- Location within Iran
- Coordinates: 37°19′44″N 46°16′34″E
- Country: Iran
- Province: East Azerbaijan
- County: Maragheh
- Bakhsh: Central
- Rural District: Qareh Naz

Population (2006)
  - Total: 279
- Time zone: UTC+3:30 (IRST)
  - Summer (DST): UTC+4:30 (IRDT)

Chay Baghi (Persian: چای باغی, also Romanized as Chāy Bāghī; also known as Chahār Bāghī) is a village in Qareh Naz Rural District, in the Central District of Maragheh County, East Azerbaijan Province, Iran. At the 2006 census, its population was 279, in 62 families.
