= Divrazm =

Divrazm ديورزم
- Village
- Location within Iran
- Coordinates: 37°19′24″N 46°22′18″E
- Country: Iran
- Province: East Azerbaijan
- County: Maragheh
- Bakhsh: Central
- Rural District: Sarajuy-ye Shomali

Population (2006)
  - Total: 280
- Time zone: UTC+3:30 (IRST)
  - Summer (DST): UTC+4:30 (IRDT)

Divrazm (Persian: ديورزم, also Romanized as Dīvrazm; also known as Davah Zīm) is a village in Sarajuy-ye Shomali Rural District, in the Central District of Maragheh County, East Azerbaijan Province, Iran. At the 2006 census, its population was 280, in 69 families.
