= Khorma Zard =

Khorma Zard خرمازرد
- Village
- Location within Iran
- Coordinates: 37°25′05″N 46°09′46″E
- Country: Iran
- Province: East Azerbaijan
- County: Maragheh
- Bakhsh: Central
- Rural District: Sarajuy-ye Gharbi

Population (2006)
  - Total: 899
- Time zone: UTC+3:30 (IRST)
  - Summer (DST): UTC+4:30 (IRDT)

Khorma Zard (Persian: خرمازرد, also Romanized as Khormā Zard; also known as Khurmazard and Khurmoza) is a village in Sarajuy-ye Gharbi Rural District, in the Central District of Maragheh County, East Azerbaijan Province, Iran. At the 2006 census, its population was 899, in 265 families.
