= Gowy Daraq =

Gowy Daraq (Persian: گوي درق) may refer to:

- Gowy Daraq-e Olya
- Gowy Daraq-e Sofla
