= Zaneq =

Zaneq زنق
- Village
- Location within Iran
- Coordinates: 37°19′49″N 46°12′07″E
- Country: Iran
- Province: East Azerbaijan
- County: Maragheh
- Bakhsh: Central
- Rural District: Qareh Naz

Population (2006)
  - Total: 130
- Time zone: UTC+3:30 (IRST)
  - Summer (DST): UTC+4:30 (IRDT)

Zaneq (Persian: زنق; also known as Zanīq) is a village in Qareh Naz Rural District, in the Central District of Maragheh County, East Azerbaijan Province, Iran. At the 2006 census, its population was 130, in 31 families.
