= Tolimkhan =

Tolimkhan (Persian: تليم خان), also rendered as Towlim Khan, may refer to:

- Tolimkhan-e Olya
- Tolimkhan-e Sofla
