= Serej =

Village in East Azerbaijan province, Iran

Serej Persian: سرج
- Village
- Location within Iran
- Coordinates: 37°20′12″N 46°10′00″E
- Country: Iran
- Province: East Azerbaijan
- County: Maragheh
- District: Central
- Rural District: Qareh Naz

Population (2016)
  - Total: 1,363
- Time zone: UTC+3:30 (IRST)

Serej (Persian: سرج) is a village in Qareh Naz Rural District of the Central District in Maragheh County, East Azerbaijan province, Iran.

== Demographics ==
=== Population ===
At the time of the 2006 National Census, the village's population was 1,271 in 333 households. The following census in 2011 counted 1,362 people in 397 households. The 2016 census measured the population of the village as 1,363 people in 424 households.
