= Khaneqah, Maragheh =

Village in East Azerbaijan province, Iran

Khaneqah Persian: خانقاه
- Village
- Location within Iran
- Coordinates: 37°19′25″N 46°11′53″E
- Country: Iran
- Province: East Azerbaijan
- County: Maragheh
- District: Central
- Rural District: Qareh Naz

Population (2016)
  - Total: 695
- Time zone: UTC+3:30 (IRST)

Khaneqah (Persian: خانقاه) (Note: Also romanized as Khāneqāh) is a village in Qareh Naz Rural District of the Central District in Maragheh County, East Azerbaijan province, Iran.

== Demographics ==
=== Population ===
At the time of the 2006 National Census, the village's population was 766 in 202 households. The following census in 2011 counted 723 people in 212 households. The 2016 census measured the population of the village as 695 people in 236 households.
