= Nova, East Azerbaijan =

Village in East Azerbaijan province, Iran

Nova Persian: نوا
- Village
- Location within Iran
- Coordinates: 37°24′55″N 46°13′25″E
- Country: Iran
- Province: East Azerbaijan
- County: Maragheh
- District: Central
- Rural District: Sarajuy-ye Gharbi

Population (2016)
  - Total: 1,620
- Time zone: UTC+3:30 (IRST)

Nova (Persian: نوا) (Note: Also romanized as Novā) is a village in Sarajuy-ye Gharbi Rural District of the Central District in Maragheh County, East Azerbaijan province, Iran.

== Demographics ==
=== Population ===
At the time of the 2006 National Census, the village's population was 1,359 in 374 households. The following census in 2011 counted 1,367 people in 412 households. The 2016 census measured the population of the village as 1,620 people in 514 households.
