= Udullu, Hajigabul =

Udullu, Hajigabul may refer to:

- Birinci Udullu, Azerbaijan
- İkinci Udullu, Azerbaijan
