= Taleb Khan =

Village in East Azerbaijan province, Iran

Taleb Khan Persian: طالبخان
- Village
- Location within Iran
- Coordinates: 37°23′26″N 46°12′14″E
- Country: Iran
- Province: East Azerbaijan
- County: Maragheh
- District: Central
- Rural District: Sarajuy-ye Gharbi

Population (2016)
  - Total: 2,848
- Time zone: UTC+3:30 (IRST)

Taleb Khan (Persian: طالبخان) (Note: Also romanized as Ţāleb Khān and Ţālebkhān) is a village in Sarajuy-ye Gharbi Rural District of the Central District in Maragheh County, East Azerbaijan province, Iran.

== Demographics ==
=== Population ===
At the time of the 2006 National Census, the village's population was 1,632 in 430 households. The following census in 2011 counted 2,280 people in 663 households. The 2016 census measured the population of the village as 2,848 people in 844 households. It was the most populous village in its rural district.
