= Behnaq =

Village in East Azerbaijan province, Iran

Behnaq Persian: بهنق
- Village
- Location within Iran
- Coordinates: 37°26′22″N 46°21′19″E
- Country: Iran
- Province: East Azerbaijan
- County: Maragheh
- District: Central
- Rural District: Sarajuy-ye Gharbi

Population (2016)
  - Total: 1,111
- Time zone: UTC+3:30 (IRST)

Behnaq (Persian: بهنق) is a village in Sarajuy-ye Gharbi Rural District of the Central District in Maragheh County, East Azerbaijan province, Iran.

== Demographics ==
=== Population ===
At the time of the 2006 National Census, the village's population was 897 in 165 households. The following census in 2011 counted 1,028 people in 239 households. The 2016 census measured the population of the village as 1,111 people in 248 households.
