= Tazeh Kand-e Aliabad =

Tazeh Kand-e Aliabad تازه كندعلي اباد
- Village
- Location within Iran
- Coordinates: 37°21′35″N 46°21′45″E
- Country: Iran
- Province: East Azerbaijan
- County: Maragheh
- Bakhsh: Central
- Rural District: Sarajuy-ye Shomali

Population (2006)
  - Total: 356
- Time zone: UTC+3:30 (IRST)
  - Summer (DST): UTC+4:30 (IRDT)

Tazeh Kand-e Aliabad (Persian: تازه كندعلي اباد, also Romanized as Tāzeh Kand-e ‘Alīābād; also known as Tāzeh Kand-e Qāsem Khān) is a village in Sarajuy-ye Shomali Rural District, in the Central District of Maragheh County, East Azerbaijan Province, Iran. At the 2006 census, its population was 356, in 77 families.
