= Musa Daraq =

Village in East Azerbaijan province, Iran

Musa Daraq Persian: موسي درق
- Village
- Location within Iran
- Coordinates: 37°17′25″N 46°12′32″E
- Country: Iran
- Province: East Azerbaijan
- County: Maragheh
- District: Central
- Rural District: Qareh Naz

Population (2016)
  - Total: 775
- Time zone: UTC+3:30 (IRST)

Musa Daraq (Persian: موسي درق) (Note: Also romanized as Mūsá Daraq) is a village in Qareh Naz Rural District of the Central District in Maragheh County, East Azerbaijan province, Iran.

== Demographics ==
=== Population ===
At the time of the 2006 National Census, the village's population was 707 in 157 households. The following census in 2011 counted 765 people in 192 households. The 2016 census measured the population of the village as 775 people in 216 households.
