= Ashan, Iran =

Village in East Azerbaijan province, Iran

Ashan Persian: اشان
- Village
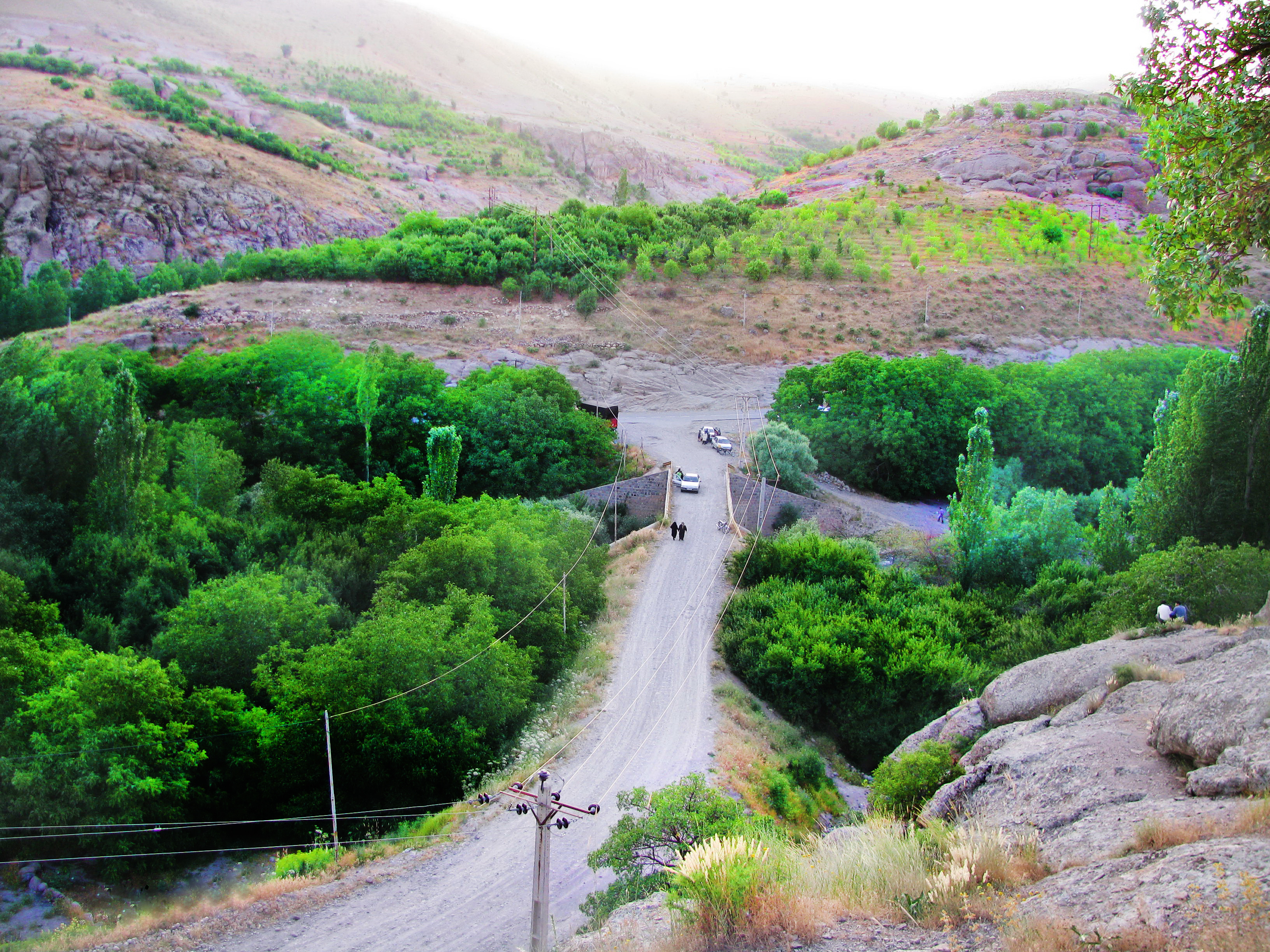
- A valley in Ashan

- Location within Iran
- Coordinates: 37°30′01″N 46°17′50″E
- Country: Iran
- Province: East Azerbaijan
- County: Maragheh
- District: Central
- Rural District: Sarajuy-ye Gharbi

Population (2016)
  - Total: 1,279
- Time zone: UTC+3:30 (IRST)

Ashan (Persian: اشان) (Note: Also romanized as Āshān and Oshān; also known as Āsān) is a village in Sarajuy-ye Gharbi Rural District of the Central District in Maragheh County, East Azerbaijan province, Iran.

== Demographics ==
=== Population ===
At the time of the 2006 National Census, the village's population was 1,268 in 300 households. The following census in 2011 counted 1,307 people in 352 households. The 2016 census measured the population of the village as 1,279 people in 331 households.
