= Karajabad =

Village in East Azerbaijan province, Iran

Karajabad Persian: كرج اباد
- Village
- Location within Iran
- Coordinates: 37°22′13″N 46°24′24″E
- Country: Iran
- Province: East Azerbaijan
- County: Maragheh
- District: Central
- Rural District: Sarajuy-ye Shomali

Population (2016)
  - Total: 2,325
- Time zone: UTC+3:30 (IRST)

Karajabad (Persian: كرج اباد) (Note: Also romanized as Karajābād; also known as Chīzābād) is a village in Sarajuy-ye Shomali Rural District of the Central District in Maragheh County, East Azerbaijan province, Iran.

== Demographics ==
=== Population ===
At the time of the 2006 National Census, the village's population was 1,947 in 420 households. The following census in 2011 counted 2,220 people in 610 households. The 2016 census measured the population of the village as 2,325 people in 660 households. It was the most populous village in its rural district.
