= Qaratlu, East Azerbaijan =

Village in East Azerbaijan province, Iran

Qaratlu Persian: قراتلو
- Village
- Location within Iran
- Coordinates: 37°29′03″N 46°25′30″E
- Country: Iran
- Province: East Azerbaijan
- County: Maragheh
- District: Central
- Rural District: Sarajuy-ye Shomali

Population (2016)
  - Total: 1,157
- Time zone: UTC+3:30 (IRST)

Qaratlu (Persian: قراتلو) (Note: Also romanized as Qarātlū; also known as Ghāratlū) is a village in Sarajuy-ye Shomali Rural District of the Central District in Maragheh County, East Azerbaijan province, Iran.

== Demographics ==
=== Population ===
At the time of the 2006 National Census, the village's population was 971 in 237 households. The following census in 2011 counted 981 people in 300 households. The 2016 census measured the population of the village as 1,157 people in 340 households.
