= Kahaq =

Village in East Azerbaijan province, Iran

Kahaq Persian: كهق
- Village
- Location within Iran
- Coordinates: 37°28′57″N 46°13′25″E
- Country: Iran
- Province: East Azerbaijan
- County: Maragheh
- District: Central
- Rural District: Sarajuy-ye Gharbi

Population (2016)
  - Total: 1,489
- Time zone: UTC+3:30 (IRST)

Kahaq (Persian: كهق) (Note: Also romanized as Kaheq; also known as Gahaq) is a village in Sarajuy-ye Gharbi Rural District of the Central District in Maragheh County, East Azerbaijan province, Iran.

== Demographics ==
=== Population ===
At the time of the 2006 National Census, the village's population was 1,600 in 425 households. The following census in 2011 counted 1,695 people in 518 households. The 2016 census measured the population of the village as 1,489 people in 451 households.
