= Qareh Naz-e Sofla =

Qareh Naz-e Sofla قره نازسفلي
- Village
- Location within Iran
- Coordinates: 37°15′58″N 46°13′40″E
- Country: Iran
- Province: East Azerbaijan
- County: Maragheh
- Bakhsh: Central
- Rural District: Qareh Naz

Population (2006)
  - Total: 90
- Time zone: UTC+3:30 (IRST)
  - Summer (DST): UTC+4:30 (IRDT)

Qareh Naz-e Sofla (Persian: قره نازسفلي, also Romanized as Qareh Nāz-e Soflá; also known as Qarah Nāz-e Pā'īn) is a village in Qareh Naz Rural District, in the Central District of Maragheh County, East Azerbaijan Province, Iran. At the 2006 census, its population was 90, in 23 families.
