= Qarah Borqa =

Village in East Azerbaijan province, Iran

Qarah Borqa Persian: قره برقع
- Village
- Location within Iran
- Coordinates: 37°24′42″N 46°15′03″E
- Country: Iran
- Province: East Azerbaijan
- County: Maragheh
- District: Central
- Rural District: Sarajuy-ye Gharbi

Population (2016)
  - Total: 1,224
- Time zone: UTC+3:30 (IRST)

Qarah Borqa (Persian: قره برقع) (Note: Also romanized as Qarah Borqa‘; also known as Qarā Borqa‘) is a village in Sarajuy-ye Gharbi Rural District of the Central District in Maragheh County, East Azerbaijan province, Iran.

== Demographics ==
=== Population ===
At the time of the 2006 National Census, the village's population was 823 in 206 households. The following census in 2011 counted 1,103 people in 309 households. The 2016 census measured the population of the village as 1,224 people in 367 households.
