= Qartavol =

Village in East Azerbaijan province, Iran

Qartavol Persian: قرطاول
- Village
- Location within Iran
- Coordinates: 37°22′13″N 46°26′57″E
- Country: Iran
- Province: East Azerbaijan
- County: Maragheh
- District: Central
- Rural District: Sarajuy-ye Shomali

Population (2016)
  - Total: 2,011
- Time zone: UTC+3:30 (IRST)

Qartavol (Persian: قرطاول) (Note: Also romanized as Qarţāvol) is a village in Sarajuy-ye Shomali Rural District of the Central District in Maragheh County, East Azerbaijan province, Iran.

== Demographics ==
=== Population ===
At the time of the 2006 National Census, the village's population was 1,699 in 406 households. The following census in 2011 counted 1,935 people in 509 households. The 2016 census measured the population of the village as 2,011 people in 608 households.
