= Alov Kandi =

Alov Kandi علوكندي
- Village
- Location within Iran
- Coordinates: 37°18′35″N 46°20′56″E
- Country: Iran
- Province: East Azerbaijan
- County: Maragheh
- Bakhsh: Central
- Rural District: Sarajuy-ye Shomali

Population (2006)
  - Total: 17
- Time zone: UTC+3:30 (IRST)
  - Summer (DST): UTC+4:30 (IRDT)

Alov Kandi (Persian: علوكندي, also Romanized as ‘Alov Kandī) is a village in Sarajuy-ye Shomali Rural District, in the Central District of Maragheh County, East Azerbaijan Province, Iran. At the 2006 census, its population was 17, in 5 families.
