= Albov =

Albov (Russian: Альбов) is a Russian surname. Notable people with the surname include:

- Mikhail Albov (1851–1911), Russian writer
- Nikolai Albov (1866–1897), Russian botanist and geographer

== See also ==
- Alov (surname)
