= Təzəkənd, Nakhchivan =

Təzəkənd, Nakhchivan may refer to:

- Təzəkənd, Kangarli
- Təzəkənd, Sharur
- Təzəkənd, Maxta
