= Ekis =

Village in East Azerbaijan province, Iran

Ekis Persian: اكيس
- Village
- Location within Iran
- Coordinates: 37°14′54″N 46°12′31″E
- Country: Iran
- Province: East Azerbaijan
- County: Maragheh
- District: Central
- Rural District: Qareh Naz

Population (2016)
  - Total: 671
- Time zone: UTC+3:30 (IRST)

Ekis (Persian: اكيس) (Note: Also romanized as Ekīs; also known as Elīs) is a village in Qareh Naz Rural District of the Central District in Maragheh County, East Azerbaijan province, Iran.

== Demographics ==
=== Population ===
At the time of the 2006 National Census, the village's population was 612 in 135 households. The following census in 2011 counted 595 people in 166 households. The 2016 census measured the population of the village as 671 people in 206 households.
