= Kahjuq =

Village in East Azerbaijan province, Iran

Kahjuq Persian: كهجوق
- Village
- Location within Iran
- Coordinates: 37°19′29″N 46°24′10″E
- Country: Iran
- Province: East Azerbaijan
- County: Maragheh
- District: Central
- Rural District: Sarajuy-ye Shomali

Population (2016)
  - Total: 1,382
- Time zone: UTC+3:30 (IRST)

Kahjuq (Persian: كهجوق) (Note: Also romanized as Kahjūq) is a village in Sarajuy-ye Shomali Rural District of the Central District in Maragheh County, East Azerbaijan province, Iran.

== Demographics ==
=== Population ===
At the time of the 2006 National Census, the village's population was 1,256 in 306 households. The following census in 2011 counted 1,449 people in 402 households. The 2016 census measured the population of the village as 1,382 people in 403 households.
