= Kordeh Deh, East Azerbaijan =

Village in East Azerbaijan province, Iran

Kordeh Deh Persian: كرده ده
- Village
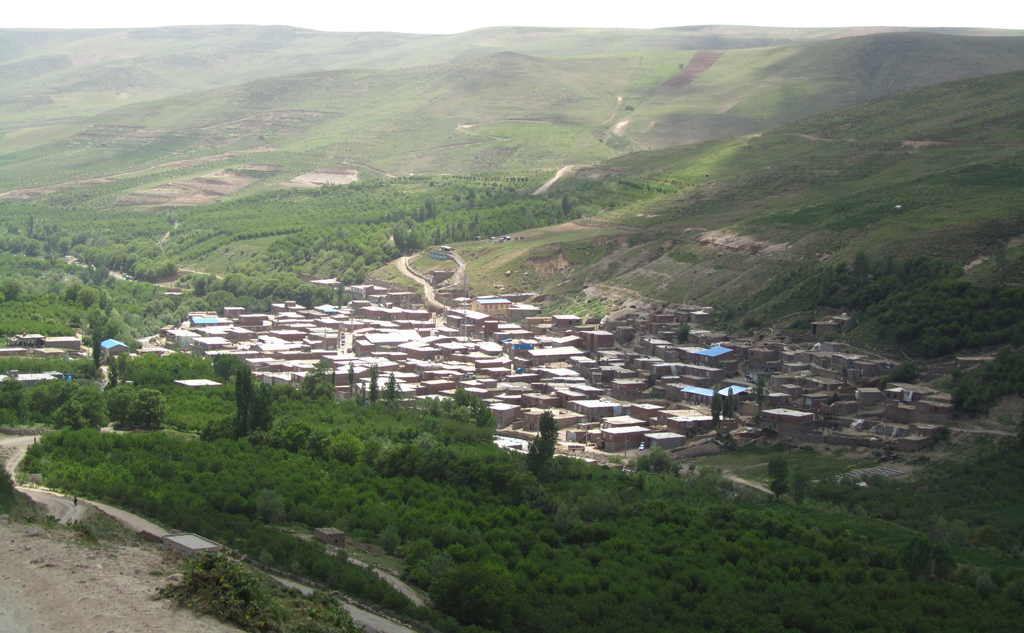
- The village of Kordeh Deh

- Location within Iran
- Coordinates: 37°30′38″N 46°25′52″E
- Country: Iran
- Province: East Azerbaijan
- County: Maragheh
- District: Central
- Rural District: Sarajuy-ye Shomali

Population (2016)
  - Total: 1,691
- Time zone: UTC+3:30 (IRST)

Kordeh Deh (Persian: كرده ده) is a village in Sarajuy-ye Shomali Rural District of the Central District in Maragheh County, East Azerbaijan province, Iran.

== Demographics ==
=== Population ===
At the time of the 2006 National Census, the village's population was 1,410 in 336 households. The following census in 2011 counted 1,436 people in 412 households. The 2016 census measured the population of the village as 1,691 people in 490 households.
