= Tazeh Kand-e Sofla =

Tazeh Kand-e Sofla تازه كندسفلي
- Village
- Location within Iran
- Coordinates: 37°20′20″N 46°17′52″E
- Country: Iran
- Province: East Azerbaijan
- County: Maragheh
- Bakhsh: Central
- Rural District: Qareh Naz

Population (2006)
  - Total: 397
- Time zone: UTC+3:30 (IRST)
  - Summer (DST): UTC+4:30 (IRDT)

Tazeh Kand-e Sofla (Persian: تازه كندسفلي, also Romanized as Tāzeh Kand-e Soflá) is a village in Qareh Naz Rural District, in the Central District of Maragheh County, East Azerbaijan Province, Iran. At the 2006 census, its population was 397, in 108 families.
