= Gowy Daraq-e Olya =

Gowy Daraq-e Olya گوي درق عليا
- Village
- Location within Iran
- Coordinates: 37°16′10″N 46°18′52″E
- Country: Iran
- Province: East Azerbaijan
- County: Maragheh
- Bakhsh: Central
- Rural District: Sarajuy-ye Shomali

Population (2006)
  - Total: 33
- Time zone: UTC+3:30 (IRST)
  - Summer (DST): UTC+4:30 (IRDT)

Gowy Daraq-e Olya (Persian: گوي درق عليا, also Romanized as Gowy Daraq-e ‘Olyā; also known as Gowy Daraq-e Bālā) is a village in Sarajuy-ye Shomali Rural District, in the Central District of Maragheh County, East Azerbaijan Province, Iran. At the 2006 census, its population was 33, in 10 families.
