= Qaleh Khaleseh =

Village in East Azerbaijan province, Iran

Qaleh Khaleseh Persian: قلعه خالصه
- Village
- Location within Iran
- Coordinates: 37°20′09″N 46°11′18″E
- Country: Iran
- Province: East Azerbaijan
- County: Maragheh
- District: Central
- Rural District: Qareh Naz

Population (2016)
  - Total: 850
- Time zone: UTC+3:30 (IRST)

Qaleh Khaleseh (Persian: قلعه خالصه) (Note: Also romanized as Qal‘eh Khāleşeh; also known as Qal‘eh) is a village in Qareh Naz Rural District of the Central District in Maragheh County, East Azerbaijan province, Iran.

== Demographics ==
=== Population ===
At the time of the 2006 National Census, the village's population was 623 in 161 households. The following census in 2011 counted 721 people in 226 households. The 2016 census measured the population of the village as 850 people in 273 households.
