= Hajji Kord =

Village in East Azerbaijan province, Iran

Hajji Kord Persian: حاجي كرد
- Village
- Location within Iran
- Coordinates: 37°23′28″N 46°11′21″E
- Country: Iran
- Province: East Azerbaijan
- County: Maragheh
- District: Central
- Rural District: Sarajuy-ye Gharbi

Population (2016)
  - Total: 1,908
- Time zone: UTC+3:30 (IRST)

Hajji Kord (Persian: حاجي كرد) (Note: Also romanized as Ḩājjī Kord) is a village in Sarajuy-ye Gharbi Rural District of the Central District in Maragheh County, East Azerbaijan province, Iran.

== Demographics ==
=== Population ===
At the time of the 2006 National Census, the village's population was 2,101 in 512 households. The following census in 2011 counted 2,238 people in 638 households. The 2016 census measured the population of the village as 1,908 people in 603 households.
