= Chavan-e Alamdar =

Chavan-e Alamdar چوان علمدار
- Village
- Location within Iran
- Coordinates: 37°21′41″N 46°18′29″E
- Country: Iran
- Province: East Azerbaijan
- County: Maragheh
- Bakhsh: Central
- Rural District: Sarajuy-ye Shomali

Population (2006)
  - Total: 16
- Time zone: UTC+3:30 (IRST)
  - Summer (DST): UTC+4:30 (IRDT)

Chavan-e Alamdar (Persian: چوان علمدار, also Romanized as Chavān-e 'Alamdār; also known as 'Alamdār) is a village in Sarajuy-ye Shomali Rural District, in the Central District of Maragheh County, East Azerbaijan province, Iran. At the 2006 census, its population was 16, in 5 families. The village is populated by both Kurds and Azeris.
