= Ahaq =

Village in East Azerbaijan province, Iran

Ahaq Persian: اهق
- Village
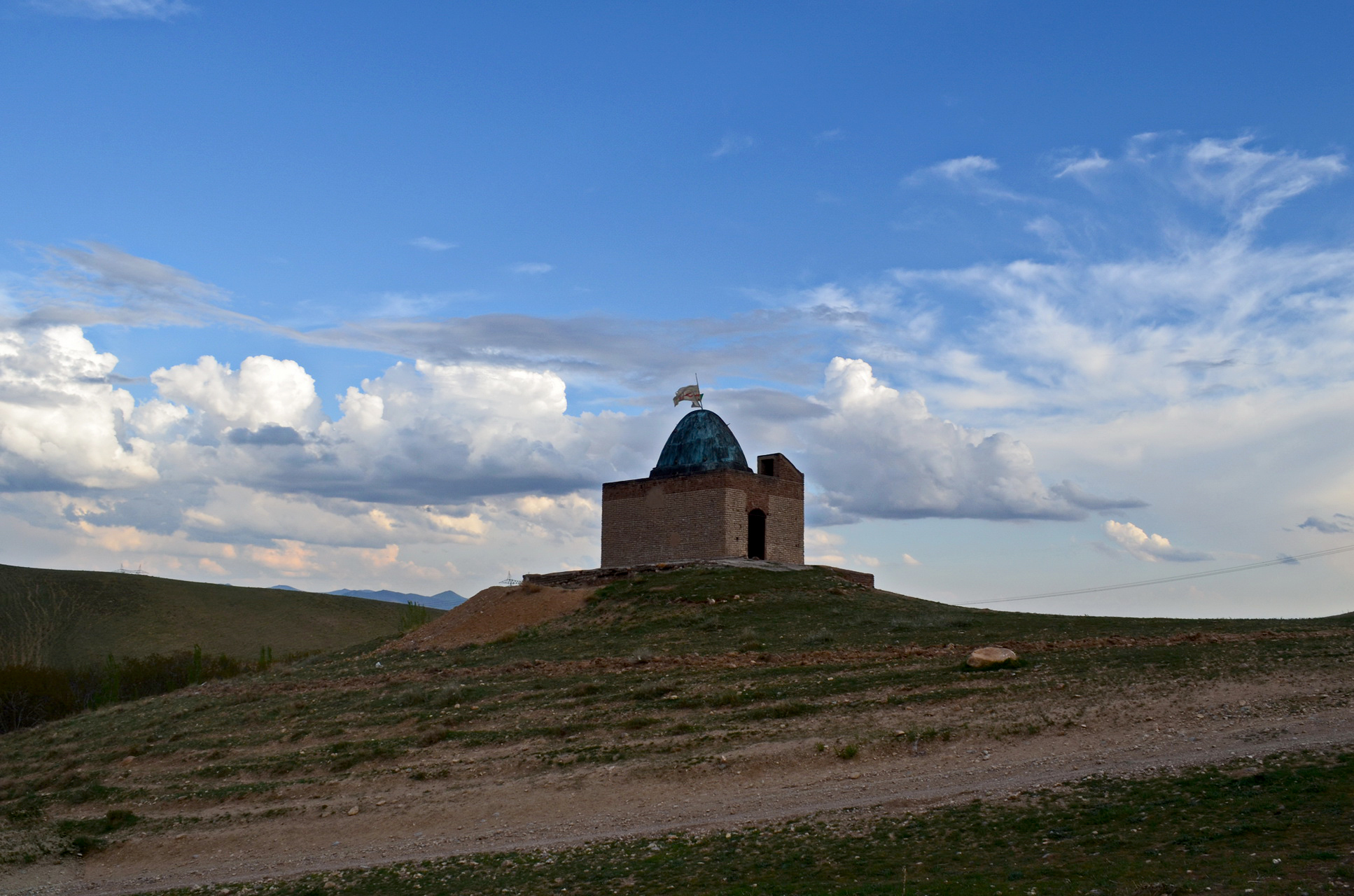
- A building in Ahaq

- Location within Iran
- Coordinates: 37°26′13″N 46°09′21″E
- Country: Iran
- Province: East Azerbaijan
- County: Maragheh
- District: Central
- Rural District: Sarajuy-ye Gharbi

Population (2016)
  - Total: 1,095
- Time zone: UTC+3:30 (IRST)

Ahaq (Persian: اهق) (Note: Also romanized as Āhaq; also known as Āfī) is a village in Sarajuy-ye Gharbi Rural District of the Central District in Maragheh County, East Azerbaijan province, Iran.

== Demographics ==
=== Population ===
At the time of the 2006 National Census, the village's population was 1,171 in 341 households. The following census in 2011 counted 1,136 people in 361 households. The 2016 census measured the population of the village as 1,095 people in 374 households.
