= Varjavi =

Village in East Azerbaijan province, Iran

Varjavi Persian: ورجوي
- Village
- Location within Iran
- Coordinates: 37°20′04″N 46°14′21″E
- Country: Iran
- Province: East Azerbaijan
- County: Maragheh
- District: Central
- Rural District: Qareh Naz

Population (2016)
  - Total: 2,989
- Time zone: UTC+3:30 (IRST)

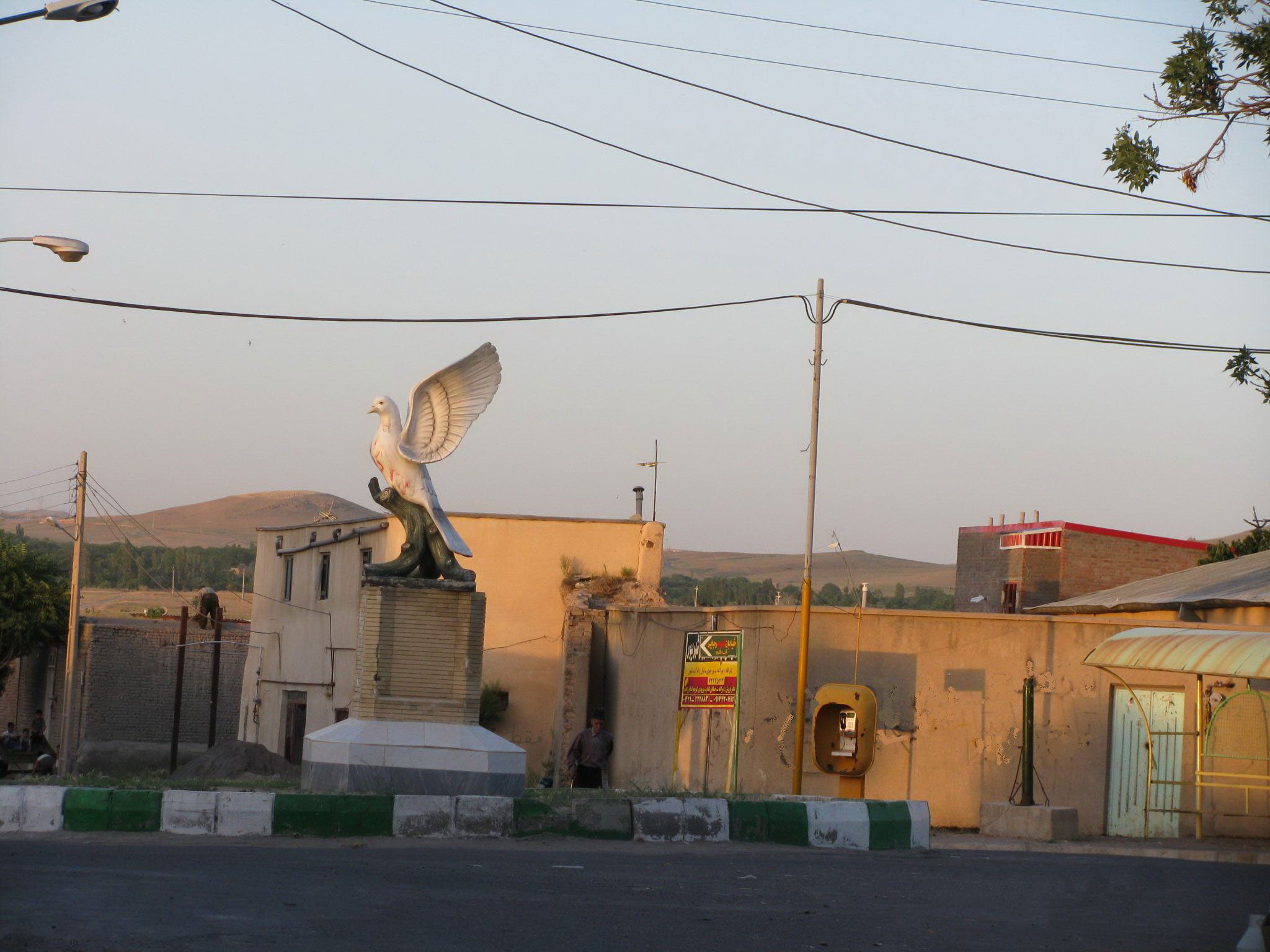
Varevi

Varjavi (Persian: ورجوي) (Note: Also romanized as Varjavī and Varjovī) is a village in, and the capital of, Qareh Naz Rural District in the Central District of Maragheh County, East Azerbaijan province, Iran.

== Demographics ==
=== Population ===
At the time of the 2006 National Census, the village's population was 3,168 in 853 households. The following census in 2011 counted 3,280 people in 1,001 households. The 2016 census measured the population of the village as 2,989 people in 999 households.
