= Narjabad =

Village in East Azerbaijan province, Iran

Narjabad Persian: نرج اباد
- Village
- Location within Iran
- Coordinates: 37°19′27″N 46°10′43″E
- Country: Iran
- Province: East Azerbaijan
- County: Maragheh
- District: Central
- Rural District: Qareh Naz

Population (2016)
  - Total: 1,553
- Time zone: UTC+3:30 (IRST)

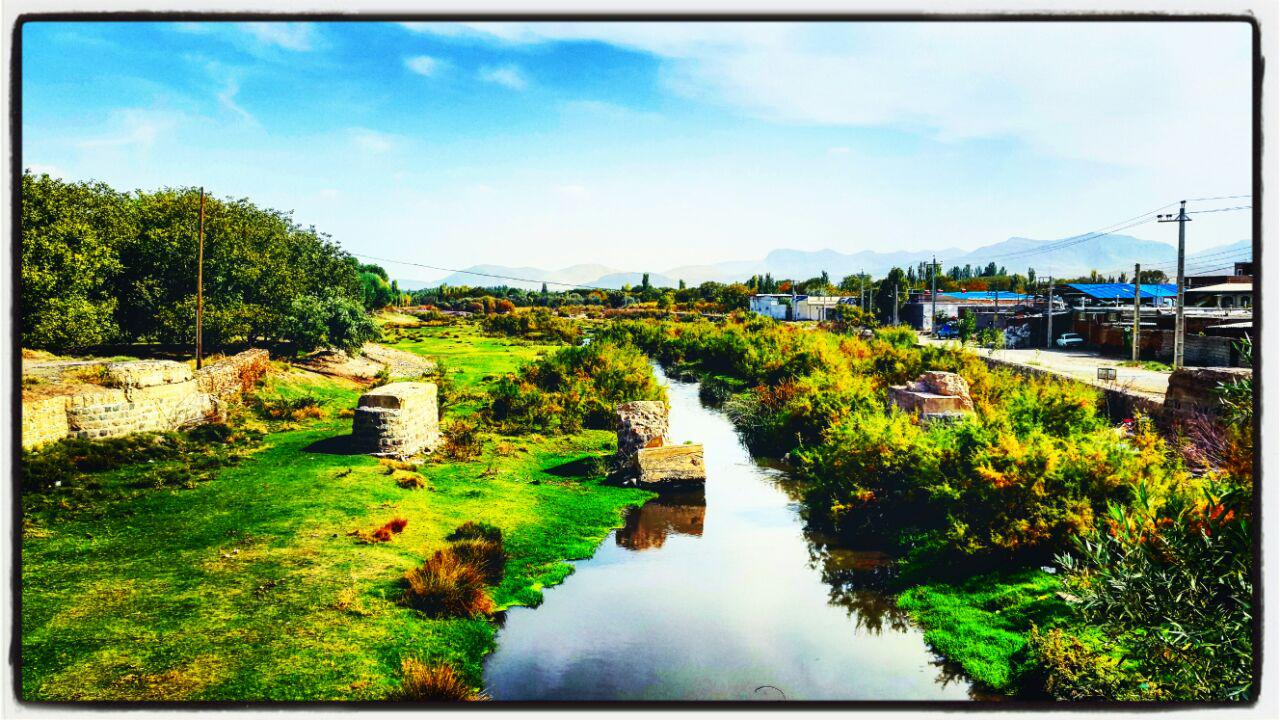
Entrance to Narjabad

Narjabad (Persian: نرج اباد) (Note: Also romanized as Narjābād) is a village in Qareh Naz Rural District of the Central District in Maragheh County, East Azerbaijan province, Iran.

== Demographics ==
=== Population ===
At the time of the 2006 National Census, the village's population was 1,626 in 419 households. The following census in 2011 counted 1,592 people in 466 households. The 2016 census measured the population of the village as 1,553 people in 488 households.
