= Sargezeh =

Village in East Azerbaijan province, Iran

Sargezeh Persian: سرگزه
- Village
- Location within Iran
- Coordinates: 37°24′00″N 46°24′31″E
- Country: Iran
- Province: East Azerbaijan
- County: Maragheh
- District: Central
- Rural District: Sarajuy-ye Shomali

Population (2016)
  - Total: 1,271
- Time zone: UTC+3:30 (IRST)

Sargezeh (Persian: سرگزه) (Note: Also known as Sargīzeh) is a village in Sarajuy-ye Shomali Rural District of the Central District in Maragheh County, East Azerbaijan province, Iran.

== Demographics ==
=== Population ===
At the time of the 2006 National Census, the village's population was 1,237 in 261 households. The following census in 2011 counted 1,266 people in 344 households. The 2016 census measured the population of the village as 1,271 people in 378 households.
