= Gowy Daraq-e Sofla =

Gowy Daraq-e Sofla گوي درق سفلي
- Village
- Location within Iran
- Coordinates: 37°16′18″N 46°18′03″E
- Country: Iran
- Province: East Azerbaijan
- County: Maragheh
- Bakhsh: Central
- Rural District: Sarajuy-ye Shomali

Population (2006)
  - Total: 59
- Time zone: UTC+3:30 (IRST)
  - Summer (DST): UTC+4:30 (IRDT)

Gowy Daraq-e Sofla (Persian: گوي درق سفلي, also Romanized as Gowy Daraq-e Soflá; also known as Gowy Daraq-e Pā'īn) is a village in Sarajuy-ye Shomali Rural District, in the Central District of Maragheh County, East Azerbaijan Province, Iran. At the 2006 census, its population was 59, in 12 families.
