= Zubanlı =

Zubanly
- Location within Azerbaijan
- Coordinates: 39°18′N 48°29′E
- Country: Azerbaijan
- Rayon: Jalilabad
- Time zone: UTC+4 (AZT)

Zubanlı is a former village in the Jalilabad Rayon of Azerbaijan which is now part of the village of Təzəkənd.
