= Esfehanjiq =

Village in East Azerbaijan province, Iran

Esfehanjiq Persian: اصفهانجيق
- Village
- Location within Iran
- Coordinates: 37°24′59″N 46°21′56″E
- Country: Iran
- Province: East Azerbaijan
- County: Maragheh
- District: Central
- Rural District: Sarajuy-ye Gharbi

Population (2016)
  - Total: 1,047
- Time zone: UTC+3:30 (IRST)

Esfehanjiq (Persian: اصفهانجيق) (Note: Also romanized as Eşfehānjīq; also known as Eşfehānjūq) is a village in Sarajuy-ye Gharbi Rural District of the Central District in Maragheh County, East Azerbaijan province, Iran.

== Demographics ==
=== Population ===
At the time of the 2006 National Census, the village's population was 814 in 188 households. The following census in 2011 counted 920 people in 263 households. The 2016 census measured the population of the village as 1,047 people in 250 households.
