= Shalilvand =

Village in East Azerbaijan province, Iran

Shalilvand Persian: شليلوند
- Village
- Location within Iran
- Coordinates: 37°23′12″N 46°26′24″E
- Country: Iran
- Province: East Azerbaijan
- County: Maragheh
- District: Central
- Rural District: Sarajuy-ye Shomali

Population (2016)
  - Total: 1,114
- Time zone: UTC+3:30 (IRST)

Shalilvand (Persian: شليلوند) (Note: Also romanized as Shalīlvand; also known as Shalīvand and Shīlūneh) is a village in Sarajuy-ye Shomali Rural District of the Central District in Maragheh County, East Azerbaijan province, Iran.

== Demographics ==
=== Population ===
At the time of the 2006 National Census, the village's population was 1,036 in 241 households. The following census in 2011 counted 1,114 people in 278 households. The 2016 census measured the population of the village as 1,114 people in 331 households.
