= Moghanjiq =

Village in East Azerbaijan province, Iran

Moghanjiq Persian: مغانجيق
- Village
- Location within Iran
- Coordinates: 37°19′51″N 46°25′05″E
- Country: Iran
- Province: East Azerbaijan
- County: Maragheh
- District: Central
- Rural District: Sarajuy-ye Shomali

Population (2016)
  - Total: 2,183
- Time zone: UTC+3:30 (IRST)

Moghanjiq (Persian: مغانجيق) (Note: Also romanized as Moghānjīq; also known as Moghānjeq) is a village in Sarajuy-ye Shomali Rural District of the Central District in Maragheh County, East Azerbaijan province, Iran.

== Demographics ==
=== Population ===
At the time of the 2006 National Census, the village's population was 1,877 in 399 households. The following census in 2011 counted 1,978 people in 565 households. The 2016 census measured the population of the village as 2,183 people in 722 households.
