= Qareh Naz-e Olya =

Qareh Naz-e Olya قره نازعليا
- Village
- Location within Iran
- Coordinates: 37°17′04″N 46°14′27″E
- Country: Iran
- Province: East Azerbaijan
- County: Maragheh
- Bakhsh: Central
- Rural District: Qareh Naz

Population (2006)
  - Total: 120
- Time zone: UTC+3:30 (IRST)
  - Summer (DST): UTC+4:30 (IRDT)

Qareh Naz-e Olya (Persian: قره نازعليا, also Romanized as Qareh Nāz-e Olyā; also known as Qarah Nāz-e Bālā) is a village in Qareh Naz Rural District, in the Central District of Maragheh County, East Azerbaijan Province, Iran. At the 2006 census, its population was 120, in 31 families.
