= Alavian, East Azerbaijan =

Village in East Azerbaijan province, Iran

Alavian Persian: علويان
- Village
- Location within Iran
- Coordinates: 37°25′20″N 46°14′11″E
- Country: Iran
- Province: East Azerbaijan
- County: Maragheh
- District: Central
- Rural District: Sarajuy-ye Gharbi

Population (2016)
  - Total: 2,544
- Time zone: UTC+3:30 (IRST)

Alavian (Persian: علويان) (Note: Also romanized as ‘Alavīān) is a village in, and the capital of, Sarajuy-ye Gharbi Rural District in the Central District of Maragheh County, East Azerbaijan province, Iran.

== Demographics ==
=== Population ===
At the time of the 2006 National Census, the village's population was 2,238 in 579 households. The following census in 2011 counted 2,529 people in 695 households. The 2016 census measured the population of the village as 2,544 people in 723 households.
