= Dash Atan, Maragheh =

Village in East Azerbaijan province, Iran

Dash Atan Persian: داش اتان
- Village
- Location within Iran
- Coordinates: 37°20′26″N 46°21′53″E
- Country: Iran
- Province: East Azerbaijan
- County: Maragheh
- District: Central
- Rural District: Sarajuy-ye Shomali

Population (2016)
  - Total: 1,296
- Time zone: UTC+3:30 (IRST)

Dash Atan (Persian: داش اتان) (Note: Also romanized as Dāsh Ātān) is a village in, and the capital of, Sarajuy-ye Shomali Rural District in the Central District of Maragheh County, East Azerbaijan province, Iran.

== Demographics ==
=== Population ===
At the time of the 2006 National Census, the village's population was 1,250 in 328 households. The following census in 2011 counted 1,218 people in 361 households. The 2016 census measured the population of the village as 1,296 people in 406 households.
