= Chavan-e Sofla =

Village in East Azerbaijan province, Iran

Chavan-e Sofla Persian: چوان سفلي
- Village
- Location within Iran
- Coordinates: 37°29′21″N 46°10′17″E
- Country: Iran
- Province: East Azerbaijan
- County: Maragheh
- District: Central
- Rural District: Sarajuy-ye Gharbi

Population (2016)
  - Total: 1,354
- Time zone: UTC+3:30 (IRST)

Chavan-e Sofla (Persian: چوان سفلي) (Note: Also romanized as Chavān-e Soflá; also known as Chavān-e Pā'īn) is a village in Sarajuy-ye Gharbi Rural District of the Central District in Maragheh County, East Azerbaijan province, Iran.

== Demographics ==
=== Population ===
At the time of the 2006 National Census, the village's population was 1,169 in 275 households. The following census in 2011 counted 1,337 people in 348 households. The 2016 census measured the population of the village as 1,354 people in 356 households.
