= Qaraçaylı =

- Location within Azerbaijan
- Coordinates: 41°22′00″N 48°55′22″E
- Country: Azerbaijan
- Rayon: Davachi
- Municipality: Təzəkənd
- Time zone: UTC+4 (AZT)
  - Summer (DST): UTC+5 (AZT)

Qaraçaylı (also, Karachayly) is a village in the Davachi Rayon of Azerbaijan. The village forms part of the municipality of Təzəkənd.
