= Chavan-e Olya =

Village in East Azerbaijan province, Iran

Chavan-e Olya Persian: چوان عليا
- Village
- Location within Iran
- Coordinates: 37°30′36″N 46°11′27″E
- Country: Iran
- Province: East Azerbaijan
- County: Maragheh
- District: Central
- Rural District: Sarajuy-ye Gharbi

Population (2016)
  - Total: 1,134
- Time zone: UTC+3:30 (IRST)

Chavan-e Olya (Persian: چوان عليا) (Note: Also romanized as Chavān-e 'Olyā) is a village in Sarajuy-ye Gharbi Rural District of the Central District in Maragheh County, East Azerbaijan province, Iran.

== Demographics ==
=== Population ===
At the time of the 2006 National Census, the village's population was 995 in 194 households. The following census in 2011 counted 1,108 people in 284 households. The 2016 census measured the population of the village as 1,134 people in 322 households.
