= Maxta =

- Municipality
- Location within Azerbaijan
- Coordinates: 39°35′18″N 44°56′52″E
- Country: Azerbaijan
- Autonomous republic: Nakhchivan
- District: Sharur

Population (2005)
  - Total: 2,478
- Time zone: UTC+4 (AZT)

Maxta (also, Makhta, Makhta Kultepe) is a village and municipality in the Sharur District of Nakhchivan Autonomous Republic, Azerbaijan. It is located 7 km in the north-west from the district center, on the plain. Its population is busy with vine-growing, farming and animal husbandry. There are secondary school, library, cultural house and a hospital in the village. It has a population of 2,478. A monument was erected in honor of the compatriots killed in The Great Patriotic War (1941–45). In the north-east of the village, on the right side of the Nakhchivan-Sadarak highway is located the Qarabulaq necropolis of the Iron Age, and on the left side is located the ancient necropolis of Maxta. The municipality consists of the villages of Maxta and Təzəkənd.

== Etymology ==
According to some researchers, the name is a distorted form of the word of Mandeh. They associated the name of the village with the words of mah (fortress, camp) and deh (village) from the Persian and explain it as "the fortress village" or "camp, the village which was built in the ancient residential area". Makhta//makta in Turkic languages, uses in the meaning "the written saying on the board". Apparently, the name of the village has been created in connection with the written stones in the area.

== Historical and archaeological monuments ==
=== Makhta Kultepe I ===
Maxta Kültəpəsi I - the settlement of the first Bronze Age near the Makhta village of the Sharur region. Was registered in 1985. It is composed from the hill of the 2 m high from ground surface is limited with sown areas, from the west side by the channel. At the result of archaeological excavations (100 m2) were achieved remains of building built with stone and mud-brick, samples of a gray colored pots, grain stones, teeth of sickle made from obsidian and flint, the obsidian arrow heads, graters, remains of the hearth plant etc. During the studies with characteristic exploration, from the settlement were found an ancient temple built from stone, and the stone idols inside the temple. According to the findings, the monument belongs to the 2nd half of 4th millennium of BC - to the 3rd millennium of BC.

=== Makhta Kultepe II ===
Maxta Kültəpəsi II - the settlement of the early Bronze Age (2nd half of the 4th millennium of BC - 3rd millennium of BC) in the west from the Makhta village of the Sharur region. Among the local people it is called as Qortculu place. At the result of researches were collected fractures of the pink and gray colored clay pots, parts of the hearth plants etc. The discovered samples of the material culture is typical for Kura–Araxes culture and is identified with the Maxta Kültəpəsi I.

=== Makhta Necropolis ===
Maxta Necropolis - the ancient monument in the north-east of the Makhta village of Sharur region, in the left side of the Nakhchivan-Sadarak highway. The pitcher graves belonging to the Necropolis were discovered on the hill where the water pool is located (1988). Unfortunately, only a fracture of one of the pots from the pitcher graves (the gray colored jug-type pot made of clay, covered with pink paint in both sight) was kept. It is supposed that the monument belongs to the 2-3 centuries.

=== Garabulag Necropolis ===
Garabulag Necropolis - the ancient archaeological monument in north of the Maxta village of the Sharur region, at the foot of the mountain. The associated with works of Amelioration and construction, the several mounds-type monuments were destroyed. In one of the mounds, the burial camera is consist from the stone box. It was determined that its walls has been built with small stones without the use of mortar fixing. The length of the camera is 4 м, width is 1.25 м, height is 1.30 м. Horse skeletons were found inside the tomb, and were discovered a bronze dagger, limestone, 4 pieces blue beads made from solution, 3 pieces jugs in large and medium-sized, 3 pieces bowls, vase, mug and kettle-style pottery. The findings which belongs to the end of the Bronze Age and early Iron Age of Nakhchivan, are similar with the archaeological materials of monuments of Maxta, Şahtaxtı, Şortəpə, Oğlanqala.
