= Tazeh Kand-e Qarah Naz =

Tazeh Kand-e Qarah Naz تازه كندقره ناز
- Village
- Location within Iran
- Coordinates: 37°16′13″N 46°14′01″E
- Country: Iran
- Province: East Azerbaijan
- County: Maragheh
- Bakhsh: Central
- Rural District: Qareh Naz

Population (2006)
  - Total: 195
- Time zone: UTC+3:30 (IRST)
  - Summer (DST): UTC+4:30 (IRDT)

Tazeh Kand-e Qarah Naz (Persian: تازه كندقره ناز, also Romanized as Tāzeh Kand-e Qarah Nāz and Tāzeh Kand-e Qarahnāz; also known as Qarah Nāz and Tāzeh Kand) is a village in Qareh Naz Rural District, in the Central District of Maragheh County, East Azerbaijan Province, Iran. At the 2006 census, its population was 195, in 43 families.
