= Chavan Bagh =

Village in East Azerbaijan province, Iran

Chavan Bagh Persian: چوان باغ
- Village
- Location within Iran
- Coordinates: 37°23′19″N 46°21′02″E
- Country: Iran
- Province: East Azerbaijan
- County: Maragheh
- District: Central
- Rural District: Sarajuy-ye Shomali

Population (2016)
  - Total: 1,039
- Time zone: UTC+3:30 (IRST)

Chavan Bagh (Persian: چوان باغ) (Note: Also romanized as Chavān Bāgh; also known as Chavān) is a village in Sarajuy-ye Shomali Rural District of the Central District in Maragheh County, East Azerbaijan province, Iran.

== Demographics ==
=== Population ===
At the time of the 2006 National Census, the village's population was 776 in 160 households. The following census in 2011 counted 907 people in 257 households. The 2016 census measured the population of the village as 1,039 people in 265 households.
