= Gomuşçu, Salyan =

Human settlement in Azerbaijan

Coordinates: 39.7703°N 48.9486°E

Gomuşçu is a village in the municipality of Təzəkənd in the Salyan Rayon of Azerbaijan.
