= Gölyeri =

- Municipality
- Location within Azerbaijan
- Coordinates: 39°00′25″N 48°23′21″E
- Country: Azerbaijan
- Rayon: Yardymli

Population
  - Total: 508
- Time zone: UTC+4 (AZT)
  - Summer (DST): UTC+5 (AZT)

Gölyeri is a village and municipality in the Yardymli Rayon of Azerbaijan. It has a population of 508. The municipality consists of the villages of Gölyeri and Təzəkənd.
