= Tazeh Kand, Jolfa =

Tazeh Kand تازه كند
- Village
- Location within Iran
- Coordinates: 38°49′20″N 45°31′45″E
- Country: Iran
- Province: East Azerbaijan
- County: Jolfa
- Bakhsh: Central
- Rural District: Shoja

Population (2006)
  - Total: 45
- Time zone: UTC+3:30 (IRST)
  - Summer (DST): UTC+4:30 (IRDT)

Tazeh Kand (Persian: تازه كند, also Romanized as Tāzeh Kand and Tāzekand) is a village in Shoja Rural District, in the Central District of Jolfa County, East Azerbaijan Province, Iran. At the 2006 census, its population was 45, in 13 families.
