= Düzqışlaq, Agstafa =

Düzqışlaq
- Municipality
- Location within Azerbaijan
- Coordinates: 41°09′21″N 45°23′19″E
- Country: Azerbaijan
- Rayon: Agstafa

Population
  - Total: 1,075
- Time zone: UTC+4 (AZT)
  - Summer (DST): UTC+5 (AZT)

Düzqışlaq (also Dyuzkhshlak, Dyuz-Kyshlag, and Dyuzkyshlak) is a village and the least populous municipality in the Agstafa Rayon of Azerbaijan. It has a population of 1,075. The municipality consists of the villages of Düzqışlaq and Kolayır.
