= Tazeh Kand-e Nahand =

Tazeh Kand-e Nahand تازه كندنهند
- Village
- Location within Iran
- Coordinates: 38°13′00″N 46°28′44″E
- Country: Iran
- Province: East Azerbaijan
- County: Heris
- Bakhsh: Khvajeh
- Rural District: Mavazekhan-e Sharqi

Population (2006)
  - Total: 278
- Time zone: UTC+3:30 (IRST)
  - Summer (DST): UTC+4:30 (IRDT)

Tazeh Kand-e Nahand (Persian: تازه كندنهند, also Romanized as Tāzeh Kand-e Nahand and Tāzeh Kand Nahand; also known as Tazakend and Tāzeh Kand) is a village in Mavazekhan-e Sharqi Rural District, Khvajeh District, Heris County, East Azerbaijan Province, Iran. At the 2006 census, its population was 278, in 74 families.
