= Kolayır, Samukh =

Kolayır
- Municipality
- Location within Azerbaijan
- Coordinates: 40°45′13″N 46°22′42″E
- Country: Azerbaijan
- Rayon: Samukh

Population
  - Total: 2,978
- Time zone: UTC+4 (AZT)
  - Summer (DST): UTC+5 (AZT)

Kolayır (also, Kolair) is a village and municipality in the Samukh Rayon of Azerbaijan. It has a population of 2,978.
