= Tazeh Kand-e Nasirpur =

Tazeh Kand-e Nasirpur تازه كندنصيرپور
- Village
- Location within Iran
- Coordinates: 37°07′42″N 46°32′50″E
- Country: Iran
- Province: East Azerbaijan
- County: Maragheh
- Bakhsh: Saraju
- Rural District: Quri Chay-ye Gharbi

Population (2006)
  - Total: 74
- Time zone: UTC+3:30 (IRST)
  - Summer (DST): UTC+4:30 (IRDT)

Tazeh Kand-e Nasirpur (Persian: تازه كندنصيرپور, also Romanized as Tāzeh Kand-e Naşīrpūr) is a village in Quri Chay-ye Gharbi Rural District, Saraju District, Maragheh County, East Azerbaijan Province, Iran. At the 2006 census, its population was 74, in 18 families.
