= Tazeh Kand-e Adaghan =

Tazeh Kand-e Adaghan تازه كند آداغان
- Village
- Location within Iran
- Coordinates: 39°27′15″N 44°38′26″E
- Country: Iran
- Province: West Azerbaijan
- County: Maku
- Bakhsh: Central
- Rural District: Chaybasar-e Jonubi

Population (2006)
  - Total: 138
- Time zone: UTC+3:30 (IRST)
  - Summer (DST): UTC+4:30 (IRDT)

Tazeh Kand-e Adaghan (Persian: تازه كند آداغان, also Romanized as Tāzeh Kand-e Ādāghān) is a village in Chaybasar-e Jonubi Rural District, in the Central District of Maku County, West Azerbaijan Province, Iran. At the 2006 census, its population was 138, in 26 families.
