= Tolimkhan-e Olya =

Tolimkhan-e Olya تليم خان عليا
- Village
- Location within Iran
- Coordinates: 39°26′24″N 44°47′40″E
- Country: Iran
- Province: West Azerbaijan
- County: Maku
- Bakhsh: Central
- Rural District: Chaybasar-e Jonubi

Population (2006)
  - Total: 58
- Time zone: UTC+3:30 (IRST)
  - Summer (DST): UTC+4:30 (IRDT)

Tolimkhan-e Olya (Persian: تليم خان عليا, also Romanized as Tolīmkhān-e ‘Olyā; also known as Towlīm Khān-e Bālā) is a village in Chaybasar-e Jonubi Rural District, in the Central District of Maku County, West Azerbaijan Province, Iran. At the 2006 census, its population was 58, in 12 families.
