= Tazeh Kand, Abbas-e Gharbi =

Tazeh Kand تازه كند
- Village
- Location within Iran
- Coordinates: 37°38′01″N 46°56′05″E
- Country: Iran
- Province: East Azerbaijan
- County: Bostanabad
- Bakhsh: Tekmeh Dash
- Rural District: Abbas-e Gharbi

Population (2006)
  - Total: 189
- Time zone: UTC+3:30 (IRST)
  - Summer (DST): UTC+4:30 (IRDT)

Tazeh Kand (Persian: تازه كند, also Romanized as Tāzeh Kand; also known as Tāzeh Kand-e Panāhī) is a village in Abbas-e Gharbi Rural District, Tekmeh Dash District, Bostanabad County, East Azerbaijan Province, Iran. At the 2006 census, its population was 189, in 31 families.
