= Tazeh Kand-e Nasirabad =

Tazeh Kand-e Nasirabad تازه كندنصيراباد
- Village
- Location within Iran
- Coordinates: 38°39′27″N 47°15′48″E
- Country: Iran
- Province: East Azerbaijan
- County: Ahar
- Bakhsh: Hurand
- Rural District: Dikleh

Population (2006)
  - Total: 49
- Time zone: UTC+3:30 (IRST)
  - Summer (DST): UTC+4:30 (IRDT)

Tazeh Kand-e Nasirabad (Persian: تازه كندنصيراباد, also Romanized as Tāzeh Kand-e Naşīrābād; also known as Tāzeh Kand) is a village in Dikleh Rural District, Hurand District, Ahar County, East Azerbaijan Province, Iran. At the 2006 census, its population was 49, in 13 families.
