= Tazeh Kand-e Qeshlaq, East Azerbaijan =

Village in East Azerbaijan province, Iran

Tazeh Kand-e Qeshlaq Persian: تازه كندقشلاق
- Village
- Location within Iran
- Coordinates: 37°27′40″N 46°16′05″E
- Country: Iran
- Province: East Azerbaijan
- County: Maragheh
- District: Central
- Rural District: Sarajuy-ye Gharbi

Area
  - Total: 0.34 km^{2} (0.13 sq mi)

Population (2016)
  - Total: 1,112
  - Density: 3,300/km^{2} (8,500/sq mi)
- Time zone: UTC+3:30 (IRST)

Tazeh Kand-e Qeshlaq (Persian: تازه كندقشلاق) (Note: Also romanized as Tāzeh Kand-e Qeshlāq; also known as Tazeh Kand-e Sadd (تازه كند سد), also romanized as Tāzeh Kand-e Sadd) is a village in Sarajuy-ye Gharbi Rural District of the Central District in Maragheh County, East Azerbaijan province, Iran. The village occupies an area of approximately 0.34 km^{2} (0.13 sq mi).

== Demographics ==
=== Population ===
At the time of the 2006 National Census, the village's population was 938 in 213 households. The following census in 2011 counted 1,108 people in 292 households. The 2016 census measured the population of the village as 1,112 people in 315 households.
