= Tazeh Kand-e Anhar =

Tazeh Kand-e Anhar تازه كندانهر
- Village
- Location within Iran
- Coordinates: 37°34′25″N 44°55′59″E
- Country: Iran
- Province: West Azerbaijan
- County: Urmia
- Bakhsh: Central
- Rural District: Rowzeh Chay

Population (2006)
  - Total: 96
- Time zone: UTC+3:30 (IRST)
  - Summer (DST): UTC+4:30 (IRDT)

Tazeh Kand-e Anhar (Persian: تازه كندانهر, also romanized as Tāzeh Kand-e Anhar; also known as Sheshmāl and Tāzeh Kand) is a village in Rowzeh Chay Rural District, in the Central District of Urmia County, West Azerbaijan Province, Iran. At the 2006 census, its population was 96, in 17 families.
