= Tazeh Kand-e Gol Chavan =

Tazeh Kand-e Gol Chavan تازه كندگل چوان
- Village
- Location within Iran
- Coordinates: 37°20′03″N 46°32′46″E
- Country: Iran
- Province: East Azerbaijan
- County: Maragheh
- Bakhsh: Saraju
- Rural District: Sarajuy-ye Sharqi

Population (2006)
  - Total: 81
- Time zone: UTC+3:30 (IRST)
  - Summer (DST): UTC+4:30 (IRDT)

Tazeh Kand-e Gol Chavan (Persian: تازه كندگل چوان, also Romanized as Tāzeh Kand-e Gol Chavān; also known as Tāzeh Kand-e Chelān) is a village in Sarajuy-ye Sharqi Rural District, Saraju District, Maragheh County, East Azerbaijan Province, Iran. At the 2006 census, its population was 81, in 18 families.
