= Tazeh Kand, Maku =

Tazeh Kand تازه كند
- Village
- Location within Iran
- Coordinates: 39°21′09″N 44°24′44″E
- Country: Iran
- Province: West Azerbaijan
- County: Maku
- Bakhsh: Central
- Rural District: Qaleh Darrehsi

Population (2006)
  - Total: 186
- Time zone: UTC+3:30 (IRST)
  - Summer (DST): UTC+4:30 (IRDT)

Tazeh Kand (Persian: تازه كند, also Romanized as Tāzeh Kand and Tāzehkand; also known as Tāzeh Kand-e Bāzargān) is a village in Qaleh Darrehsi Rural District, in the Central District of Maku County, West Azerbaijan Province, Iran. At the 2006 census, its population was 186, in 35 families.
