= Tazeh Kand-e Qarajeh Qayah =

Tazeh Kand-e Qarajeh Qayah تازه كندقراجه قيه
- Village
- Location within Iran
- Coordinates: 37°16′03″N 46°52′18″E
- Country: Iran
- Province: East Azerbaijan
- County: Hashtrud
- Bakhsh: Nazarkahrizi
- Rural District: Nazarkahrizi

Population (2006)
  - Total: 142
- Time zone: UTC+3:30 (IRST)
  - Summer (DST): UTC+4:30 (IRDT)

Tazeh Kand-e Qarajeh Qayah (Persian: تازه كندقراجه قيه, romanized: Tāzeh Kand-e Qarājeh Qayah; also known as Tāzeh Kand-e Qezel Dāgh and Tāzeh Kand-e Qezel Dāghī) is a village in Nazarkahrizi Rural District, Nazarkahrizi District, Hashtrud County, East Azerbaijan Province, Iran. At the 2006 census, its population was 142, in 27 families.
