= Dash Atan, Bostanabad =

Dash Atan داش اتان
- Village
- Location within Iran
- Coordinates: 37°40′33″N 47°06′26″E
- Country: Iran
- Province: East Azerbaijan
- County: Bostanabad
- Bakhsh: Tekmeh Dash
- Rural District: Abbas-e Sharqi

Population (2006)
  - Total: 10
- Time zone: UTC+3:30 (IRST)
  - Summer (DST): UTC+4:30 (IRDT)

Dash Atan (Persian: داش اتان, also Romanized as Dāsh Ātān; also known as Dāneshābād) is a village in Abbas-e Sharqi Rural District, Tekmeh Dash District, Bostanabad County, East Azerbaijan Province, Iran. At the 2006 census, its population was 10, in 4 families. The name has roots in Southern Azeri language and it means "where rocks are thrown". Stories are that in old times kids in the area used to throw rocks at trains passing by, which is where the name is originated.
