= Tazeh Kand, Razan =

Tazeh Kand تازه كند
- Village
- Location within Iran
- Coordinates: 35°24′51″N 48°59′20″E
- Country: Iran
- Province: Hamadan
- County: Razan
- Bakhsh: Central
- Rural District: Razan

Population (2006)
  - Total: 267
- Time zone: UTC+3:30 (IRST)
  - Summer (DST): UTC+4:30 (IRDT)

Tazeh Kand (Persian: تازه كند, also Romanized as Tāzeh Kand) is a village in Razan Rural District, in the Central District of Razan County, Hamadan Province, Iran. At the 2006 census, its population was 267, in 61 families.
