= Tazeh Kand-e Madan =

Tazeh Kand-e Madan تازه كندمعدن
- Village
- Location within Iran
- Coordinates: 36°08′44″N 47°59′23″E
- Country: Iran
- Province: Kurdistan
- County: Bijar
- Bakhsh: Korani
- Rural District: Gorgin

Population (2006)
  - Total: 107
- Time zone: UTC+3:30 (IRST)
  - Summer (DST): UTC+4:30 (IRDT)

Tazeh Kand-e Madan (Persian: تازه كندمعدن, also Romanized as Tāzeh Kand-e Ma‘dan) is a village in Gorgin Rural District, Korani District, Bijar County, Kurdistan Province, Iran. At the 2006 census, its population was 107, in 19 families. The village is populated by Azerbaijanis.
