= Tazeh Kand, Rudqat =

Tazeh Kand تازه كند
- Village
- Location within Iran
- Coordinates: 38°23′48″N 46°14′40″E
- Country: Iran
- Province: East Azerbaijan
- County: Shabestar
- Bakhsh: Sufian
- Rural District: Rudqat

Population (2006)
  - Total: 101
- Time zone: UTC+3:30 (IRST)
  - Summer (DST): UTC+4:30 (IRDT)

Tazeh Kand (Persian: تازه كند, also Romanized as Tāzeh Kand; also known as Tazakend) is a village in Rudqat Rural District, Sufian District, Shabestar County, East Azerbaijan Province, Iran. At the 2006 census, its population was 101, in 25 families.
