= Tazeh Kand-e Yaft =

Tazeh Kand-e Yaft تازه كنديافت
- Village
- Location within Iran
- Coordinates: 38°50′15″N 47°29′37″E
- Country: Iran
- Province: East Azerbaijan
- County: Ahar
- Bakhsh: Hurand
- Rural District: Dodangeh

Population (2006)
  - Total: 26
- Time zone: UTC+3:30 (IRST)
  - Summer (DST): UTC+4:30 (IRDT)

Tazeh Kand-e Yaft (Persian: تازه كنديافت, also Romanized as Tāzeh Kand-e Yāft; also known as Tāzeh Kand-e Chāy and Tāzeh Kand) is a village in Dodangeh Rural District, Hurand District, Ahar County, East Azerbaijan Province, Iran. At the 2006 census, its population was 26, in 8 families.
