= Tazehkand, Poldasht =

Tazehkand تازه كند
- Village
- Location within Iran
- Coordinates: 39°33′10″N 44°54′22″E
- Country: Iran
- Province: West Azerbaijan
- County: Poldasht
- Bakhsh: Central
- Rural District: Chaybasar-e Sharqi

Population (2006)
  - Total: 129
- Time zone: UTC+3:30 (IRST)
  - Summer (DST): UTC+4:30 (IRDT)

Tazehkand (Persian: تازه كند, also Romanized as Tāzehkand) is a village in Chaybasar-e Sharqi Rural District, in the Central District of Poldasht County, West Azerbaijan Province, Iran. At the 2006 census, its population was 129, in 25 families.
