= Tazeh Kand, Urmia =

Tazeh Kand تازه كند
- Village
- Location within Iran
- Coordinates: 37°26′13″N 45°14′52″E
- Country: Iran
- Province: West Azerbaijan
- County: Urmia
- Bakhsh: Central
- Rural District: Torkaman

Population (2006)
  - Total: 365
- Time zone: UTC+3:30 (IRST)
  - Summer (DST): UTC+4:30 (IRDT)

Tazeh Kand (Persian: تازه كند, romanized: Tāzeh Kand, also known as Tāzeh Kand-e Emām; Syriac: Tāzākand) is a village in Torkaman Rural District, in the Central District of Urmia County, West Azerbaijan Province, Iran. At the 2006 census, its population was 365, in 94 families.

== History ==
Tāzākand (today called Tazeh Kand) was inhabited by 7 Church of the East Christian families in 1877 with no priest or church, according to Edward Lewes Cutts. It was located in the Baranduz District.

== Bibliography ==
- Wilmshurst, David (2000). The Ecclesiastical Organisation of the Church of the East, 1318–1913 (PDF). Peeters Publishers.
