= Tazeh Kand-e Deym =

Tazeh Kand-e Deym تازه كندديم
- Village
- Location within Iran
- Coordinates: 37°02′25″N 45°24′02″E
- Country: Iran
- Province: West Azerbaijan
- County: Naqadeh
- Bakhsh: Mohammadyar
- Rural District: Hasanlu

Population (2006)
  - Total: 40
- Time zone: UTC+3:30 (IRST)
  - Summer (DST): UTC+4:30 (IRDT)

Tazeh Kand-e Deym (Persian: تازه كندديم, also Romanized as Tāzeh Kand-e Deym) is a village in Hasanlu Rural District, Mohammadyar District, Naqadeh County, West Azerbaijan Province, Iran. At the 2006 census, its population was 40, in 13 families.
