= Chekan =

Village in East Azerbaijan province, Iran

Chekan Persian: چكان
- Village
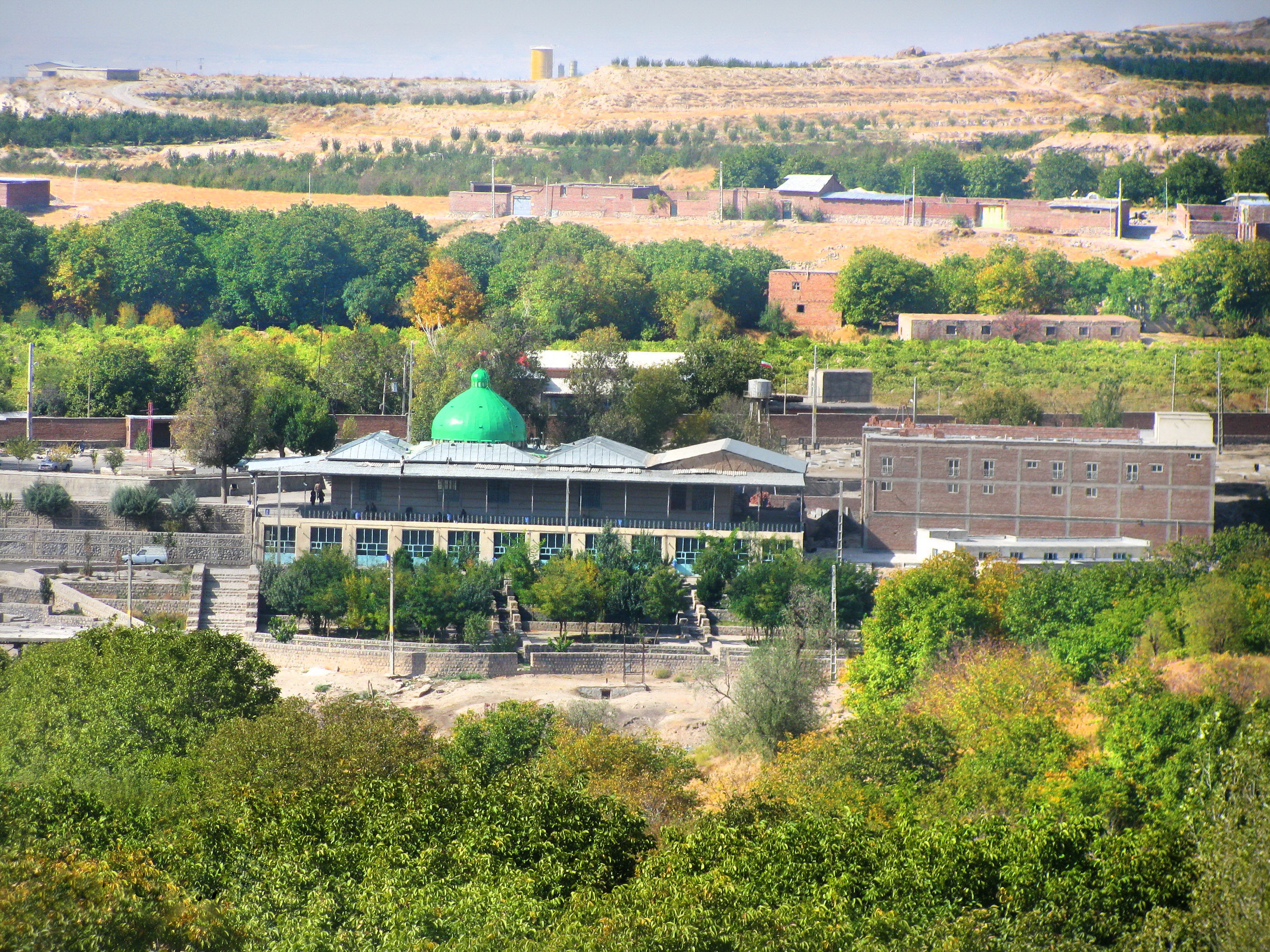
- Emamzadeh Ebrahim in the village of Chekan

- Location within Iran
- Coordinates: 37°20′55″N 46°19′07″E
- Country: Iran
- Province: East Azerbaijan
- County: Maragheh
- District: Central
- Rural District: Sarajuy-ye Shomali

Population (2016)
  - Total: 1,022
- Time zone: UTC+3:30 (IRST)

Chekan (Persian: چكان) (Note: Also romanized as Chakān and Chekān; also known as Chagān, Chikian, and Chikyan) is a village in Sarajuy-ye Shomali Rural District of the Central District in Maragheh County, East Azerbaijan province, Iran.

== Demographics ==
=== Population ===
At the time of the 2006 National Census, the village's population was 966 in 231 households. The following census in 2011 counted 1,120 people in 302 households. The 2016 census measured the population of the village as 1,022 people in 293 households.
