= Tazeh Kand, Maragheh =

Tazeh Kand تازه كند
- Village
- Location within Iran
- Coordinates: 37°07′05″N 46°38′58″E
- Country: Iran
- Province: East Azerbaijan
- County: Maragheh
- Bakhsh: Saraju
- Rural District: Quri Chay-ye Gharbi

Population (2006)
  - Total: 28
- Time zone: UTC+3:30 (IRST)
  - Summer (DST): UTC+4:30 (IRDT)

Tazeh Kand (Persian: تازه كند, also Romanized as Tāzeh Kand; also known as Tāzeh Kand-e ‘Eydlū) is a village in Quri Chay-ye Gharbi Rural District, Saraju District, Maragheh County, East Azerbaijan Province, Iran. At the 2006 census, its population was 28, in 7 families.
