= Tazeh Kand-e Masqaran =

Tazeh Kand-e Masqaran تازه كندمسقران
- Village
- Location within Iran
- Coordinates: 38°35′33″N 46°52′17″E
- Country: Iran
- Province: East Azerbaijan
- County: Ahar
- Bakhsh: Central
- Rural District: Azghan

Population (2006)
  - Total: 319
- Time zone: UTC+3:30 (IRST)
  - Summer (DST): UTC+4:30 (IRDT)

Tazeh Kand-e Masqaran (Persian: تازه كندمسقران, also Romanized as Tāzeh Kand-e Masqarān and Tāzeh Kand Masqarān; also known as Tazakend, Tāzeh Kand, and Tazeh Kand Masfaran) is a village in Azghan Rural District, in the Central District of Ahar County, East Azerbaijan Province, Iran. At the 2006 census, its population was 319, in 75 families.
