= Tazeh Kand-e Niq =

Tazeh Kand-e Niq تازه كندنيق
- Village
- Location within Iran
- Coordinates: 38°49′31″N 47°15′53″E
- Country: Iran
- Province: East Azerbaijan
- County: Ahar
- Bakhsh: Hurand
- Rural District: Dodangeh

Population (2006)
  - Total: 137
- Time zone: UTC+3:30 (IRST)
  - Summer (DST): UTC+4:30 (IRDT)

Tazeh Kand-e Niq (Persian: تازه كندنيق, also Romanized as Tāzeh Kand-e Nīq; also known as Tāzeh Kand) is a village in Dodangeh Rural District, Hurand District, Ahar County, East Azerbaijan Province, Iran. At the 2006 census, its population was 137, in 26 families.
