= Düzqışlaq, Shamkir =

Düzqışlaq is a village in the municipality of Təzəkənd in the Shamkir Rayon of Azerbaijan.
