= Təzəkənd, Yardymli =

Təzəkənd (Azerbaijani for "New village") is a village in the municipality of Gölyeri in the Yardymli Rayon of Azerbaijan.
