= Chakanak =

Chakanak چاكانك
- Village
- Location within Iran
- Coordinates: 36°45′44″N 50°11′08″E
- Country: Iran
- Province: Gilan
- County: Rudsar
- Bakhsh: Rahimabad
- Rural District: Siyarastaq Yeylaq

Population (2006)
  - Total: 58
- Time zone: UTC+3:30 (IRST)
  - Summer (DST): UTC+4:30 (IRDT)

Chakanak (Persian: چاكانك, also Romanized as Chākānak; also known as Chākān) is a village in Siyarastaq Yeylaq Rural District, Rahimabad District, Rudsar County, Gilan Province, Iran. At the 2006 census, its population was 58, in 15 families.
