= Kolayır, Barda =

Village in Azerbaijan

Kolayır is a village and municipality in the Barda Rayon of Azerbaijan. As of 2008, it had a population of 328.
