= Tazeh Kand-e Sowlati =

Tazeh Kand-e Sowlati تازه كندصولتي
- Village
- Location within Iran
- Coordinates: 37°07′38″N 46°47′58″E
- Country: Iran
- Province: East Azerbaijan
- County: Charuymaq
- Bakhsh: Central
- Rural District: Quri Chay-ye Sharqi

Population (2006)
  - Total: 77
- Time zone: UTC+3:30 (IRST)
  - Summer (DST): UTC+4:30 (IRDT)

Tazeh Kand-e Sowlati (Persian: تازه كندصولتي, also Romanized as Tāzeh Kand-e Şowlatī) is a village in Quri Chay-ye Sharqi Rural District, in the Central District of Charuymaq County, East Azerbaijan Province, Iran. At the 2006 census, its population was 77, in 15 families.
