= Guydaraq Kandi =

Guydaraq Kandi گوي درق كندي
- Village
- Location within Iran
- Coordinates: 38°20′40″N 46°51′23″E
- Country: Iran
- Province: East Azerbaijan
- County: Heris
- Bakhsh: Khvajeh
- Rural District: Bedevostan-e Gharbi

Population (2006)
  - Total: 154
- Time zone: UTC+3:30 (IRST)
  - Summer (DST): UTC+4:30 (IRDT)

Guydaraq Kandi (Persian: گوي درق كندي, also Romanized as Guydaraq Kandī; also known as Gūreh Daraq, Guydaraq, Gūy Daraq-e Tāzeh Kand, Karadara, Kūydaraq, Taza-kend, Taza-Kend, and Tāzeh Kand) is a village in Bedevostan-e Gharbi Rural District, Khvajeh District, Heris County, East Azerbaijan Province, Iran. At the 2006 census, its population was 154, in 35 families.
