= Tazeh Kand-e Sarand =

Tazeh Kand-e Sarand تازه كندسرند
- Village
- Location within Iran
- Coordinates: 38°19′25″N 46°36′40″E
- Country: Iran
- Province: East Azerbaijan
- County: Heris
- Bakhsh: Khvajeh
- Rural District: Mavazekhan-e Shomali

Population (2006)
  - Total: 225
- Time zone: UTC+3:30 (IRST)
  - Summer (DST): UTC+4:30 (IRDT)

Tazeh Kand-e Sarand (Persian: تازه كندسرند, also Romanized as Tāzeh Kand-e Sarand and Tāzeh Kand Sarand; also known as Tazakend, Tāzeh Kand, and Tāzeh Kandī) is a village in Mavazekhan-e Shomali Rural District, Khvajeh District, Heris County, East Azerbaijan Province, Iran. As of the 2006 census, its population was 225, in 50 families.
