= Tazeh Kand, Bostanabad =

Tazeh Kand تازه كند
- Village
- Location within Iran
- Coordinates: 38°03′37″N 46°55′52″E
- Country: Iran
- Province: East Azerbaijan
- County: Bostanabad
- Bakhsh: Central
- Rural District: Mehranrud-e Markazi

Population (2006)
  - Total: 327
- Time zone: UTC+3:30 (IRST)
  - Summer (DST): UTC+4:30 (IRDT)

Tazeh Kand (Persian: تازه كند, also Romanized as Tāzeh Kand and Tazakend) is a village in Mehranrud-e Markazi Rural District, in the Central District of Bostanabad County, East Azerbaijan Province, Iran. At the 2006 census, its population was 327, in 68 families.
