= Tazeh Kand-e Divan Ali =

Tazeh Kand-e Divan Ali تازه كندديوانعلي
- Village
- Location within Iran
- Coordinates: 37°32′22″N 47°50′50″E
- Country: Iran
- Province: East Azerbaijan
- County: Meyaneh
- Bakhsh: Central
- Rural District: Garmeh-ye Jonubi

Population (2006)
  - Total: 58
- Time zone: UTC+3:30 (IRST)
  - Summer (DST): UTC+4:30 (IRDT)

Tazeh Kand-e Divan Ali (Persian: تازه كندديوانعلي, also Romanized as Tāzeh Kand-e Dīvān ʿAlī; also known as Dīvānlaq and Tāzeh Kand-e Dīvānlīq) is a village in Garmeh-ye Jonubi Rural District, in the Central District of Meyaneh County, East Azerbaijan Province, Iran. At the 2006 census, its population was 58, in 13 families.
