= Tazeh Kand-e Bekrabad =

Tazeh Kand-e Bekrabad تازه كندبكراباد
- Village
- Location within Iran
- Coordinates: 38°34′44″N 46°42′44″E
- Country: Iran
- Province: East Azerbaijan
- County: Varzaqan
- Bakhsh: Central
- Rural District: Ozomdel-e Shomali

Population (2006)
  - Total: 124
- Time zone: UTC+3:30 (IRST)
  - Summer (DST): UTC+4:30 (IRDT)

Tazeh Kand-e Bekrabad (Persian: تازه كندبكراباد, also Romanized as Tāzeh Kand-e Bekrābād; also known as Taza-Kyand and Tāzeh Kand) is a village in Ozomdel-e Shomali Rural District, in the Central District of Varzaqan County, East Azerbaijan Province, Iran. At the 2006 census, its population was 124, in 26 families.
