= Düzqışlaq, Goranboy =

Düzqışlaq
- Municipality
- Location within Azerbaijan
- Coordinates: 40°43′23″N 46°31′46″E
- Country: Azerbaijan
- Rayon: Goranboy

Population
  - Total: 2,551
- Time zone: UTC+4 (AZT)

Düzqışlaq, Ağamalıoğlu (?-2018) (also, Agamalyoglu) is a village and municipality in the Goranboy Rayon of Azerbaijan. It has a population of 2,551.
