= Tazeh Kand-e Davudlu =

Tazeh Kand-e Davudlu تازه كندداودلو
- Village
- Location within Iran
- Coordinates: 39°00′35″N 47°20′24″E
- Country: Iran
- Province: East Azerbaijan
- County: Ahar
- Bakhsh: Hurand
- Rural District: Chahardangeh

Population (2006)
  - Total: 128
- Time zone: UTC+3:30 (IRST)
  - Summer (DST): UTC+4:30 (IRDT)

Tazeh Kand-e Davudlu (Persian: تازه كندداودلو, also Romanized as Tāzeh Kand-e Dāvūdlū; also known as Tāzeh Kand) is a village in Chahardangeh Rural District, Hurand District, Ahar County, East Azerbaijan Province, Iran. At the 2006 census, its population was 128, in 23 families.
