= Tazeh Kand-e Tahmasb =

Tazeh Kand-e Tahmasb تازه كندطهماسب
- Village
- Location within Iran
- Coordinates: 38°25′28″N 47°09′00″E
- Country: Iran
- Province: East Azerbaijan
- County: Ahar
- Bakhsh: Central
- Rural District: Bozkosh

Population (2006)
  - Total: 206
- Time zone: UTC+3:30 (IRST)
  - Summer (DST): UTC+4:30 (IRDT)

Tazeh Kand-e Tahmasb (Persian: تازه كندطهماسب, also Romanized as Tāzeh Kand-e Ţahmāsb) is a village in Bozkosh Rural District, in the Central District of Ahar County, East Azerbaijan Province, Iran. At the 2006 census, its population was 206, in 49 families.
