= Tazeh Kand-e Baba Ganjeh =

Tazeh Kand-e Baba Ganjeh تازه كندباباگنجه
- Village
- Location within Iran
- Coordinates: 37°43′00″N 45°08′00″E
- Country: Iran
- Province: West Azerbaijan
- County: Urmia
- Bakhsh: Nazlu
- Rural District: Nazlu-e Shomali

Population (2006)
  - Total: 50
- Time zone: UTC+3:30 (IRST)
  - Summer (DST): UTC+4:30 (IRDT)

Tazeh Kand-e Baba Ganjeh (Persian: تازه كندباباگنجه, also Romanized as Tāzeh Kand-e Bābā Ganjeh) is a village in Nazlu-e Shomali Rural District, Nazlu District, Urmia County, West Azerbaijan Province, Iran. At the 2006 census, its population was 50, in 13 families.
