= Tazeh Kand-e Poruch =

Tazeh Kand-e Poruch تازه كندپروچ
- Village
- Location within Iran
- Coordinates: 37°41′06″N 47°46′34″E
- Country: Iran
- Province: East Azerbaijan
- County: Meyaneh
- Bakhsh: Kandovan
- Rural District: Kandovan

Population (2006)
  - Total: 88
- Time zone: UTC+3:30 (IRST)
  - Summer (DST): UTC+4:30 (IRDT)

Tazeh Kand-e Poruch (Persian: تازه كندپروچ, also Romanized as Tāzeh Kand-e Porūch; also known as Tāzeh Kand) is a village in Kandovan Rural District, Kandovan District, Meyaneh County, East Azerbaijan Province, Iran. At the 2006 census, its population was 88, in 18 families.
