= Kolayır, Agstafa =

Kolayır
- Location within Azerbaijan
- Coordinates: 41°10′06″N 45°22′18″E
- Country: Azerbaijan
- Rayon: Agstafa
- Municipality: Düzqışlaq
- Elevation: 327 m (1,073 ft)
- Time zone: UTC+4 (AZT)
  - Summer (DST): UTC+5 (AZT)

Kolayır is a village in the Agstafa Rayon of Azerbaijan. The village forms part of the municipality of Düzqışlaq.
