= Təzəkənd, Aghjabadi =

Təzəkənd
- Municipality
- Location within Azerbaijan Location within Karabakh Economic Region
- Coordinates: 40°06′08″N 47°19′27″E
- Country: Azerbaijan
- Rayon: Aghjabadi

Population
  - Total: 2,100
- Time zone: UTC+4 (AZT)
  - Summer (DST): UTC+5 (AZT)

Təzəkənd (also known as Gusyulyu-Tazakend and Tazakend) is a village and municipality in the Aghjabadi Rayon of Azerbaijan. It has a population of 2,100.
