= İkinci Udullu =

- Municipality
- Location within Azerbaijan
- Coordinates: 40°18′35″N 48°50′30″E
- Country: Azerbaijan
- Rayon: Hajigabul

Population
  - Total: 1,295
- Time zone: UTC+4 (AZT)
  - Summer (DST): UTC+5 (AZT)

İkinci Udullu (also, Dzhangyan-Udulu, Dzhankend, Uduli Vtoryye, and Udullu Vtoroye) is a village and municipality in the Hajigabul Rayon of Azerbaijan. It has a population of 1,295.
