= Təzəkənd, Tartar =

Təzəkənd
- Municipality
- Location within Azerbaijan Location within Karabakh Economic Region
- Coordinates: 40°18′N 47°07′E
- Country: Azerbaijan
- Rayon: Tartar
- Time zone: UTC+4 (AZT)
  - Summer (DST): UTC+5 (AZT)

Təzəkənd (also, Tazakend) is a village and municipality in the Tartar Rayon of Azerbaijan.
