= Tazeh Kand-e Qeshlaq, West Azerbaijan =

Iranian village

Tazeh Kand-e Qeshlaq تازه كندقشلاق
- Village
- Location within Iran
- Coordinates: 37°39′58″N 45°01′15″E
- Country: Iran
- Province: West Azerbaijan
- County: Urmia
- Bakhsh: Central
- Rural District: Nazluy-ye Jonubi

Population (2006)
  - Total: 116
- Time zone: UTC+3:30 (IRST)
  - Summer (DST): UTC+4:30 (IRDT)

Tazeh Kand-e Qeshlaq (Persian: تازه كندقشلاق, also Romanized as Tāzeh Kand-e Qeshlāq) is a village in Nazluy-ye Jonubi Rural District, in the Central District of Urmia County, West Azerbaijan Province, Iran. At the 2006 census, its population was 116, in 33 families.
