= Təzəkənd, Shamkir =

Təzəkənd
- Municipality
- Location within Azerbaijan
- Coordinates: 40°49′53″N 46°08′37″E
- Country: Azerbaijan
- Rayon: Shamkir

Population
  - Total: 4,699
- Time zone: UTC+4 (AZT)
  - Summer (DST): UTC+5 (AZT)

Təzəkənd (also, Tazakend) is a village and municipality in the Shamkir Rayon of Azerbaijan. It has a population of 4,699. The municipality consists of the villages of Təzəkənd and Düzqışlaq.
