= Təzəkənd, Ismailli =

Təzəkənd
- Municipality
- Location within Azerbaijan
- Coordinates: 40°44′46″N 48°16′16″E
- Country: Azerbaijan
- Rayon: Ismailli

Population
  - Total: 1,520
- Time zone: UTC+4 (AZT)
  - Summer (DST): UTC+5 (AZT)

Təzəkənd is a village and municipality in the Ismailli Rayon of Azerbaijan. It has a population of 1,520.
