= Təzəkənd, Salyan =

Təzəkənd
- Municipality
- Location within Azerbaijan
- Coordinates: 39°42′57″N 48°55′27″E
- Country: Azerbaijan
- Rayon: Salyan

Population
  - Total: 2,965
- Time zone: UTC+4 (AZT)
  - Summer (DST): UTC+5 (AZT)

Təzəkənd (also, Taza-Kend) is a village and municipality in the Salyan Rayon of Azerbaijan. It has a population of 2,965. The municipality consists of the villages of Təzəkənd and Gomuşçu.
