= Təzəkənd, Beylagan =

Təzəkənd
- Municipality
- Location within Azerbaijan
- Coordinates: 39°48′56″N 47°35′19″E
- Country: Azerbaijan
- Rayon: Beylagan

Population
  - Total: 2,880
- Time zone: UTC+4 (AZT)
  - Summer (DST): UTC+5 (AZT)

Təzəkənd (also, Tazakend) is a village and municipality in the Beylagan Rayon of Azerbaijan. It has a population of 2,880.
