= Təzəkənd, Dashkasan =

Təzəkənd
- Municipality
- Location within Azerbaijan
- Coordinates: 40°27′58″N 45°56′26″E
- Country: Azerbaijan
- Rayon: Dashkasan

Population
  - Total: 560
- Time zone: UTC+4 (AZT)
  - Summer (DST): UTC+5 (AZT)

Təzəkənd (also, Tazakend) is a village and municipality in the Dashkasan Rayon of Azerbaijan. It has a population of 560.
