= Birinci Udullu =

- Municipality
- Location within Azerbaijan
- Coordinates: 40°15′41″N 48°52′43″E
- Country: Azerbaijan
- Rayon: Hajigabul

Population
  - Total: 1,837
- Time zone: UTC+4 (AZT)
  - Summer (DST): UTC+5 (AZT)

Birinci Udullu (also, Tava, Udula, Uduli, Uduli Pervyye, Udullu Pervoye, Udulu, and Uduly) is a village and municipality in the Hajigabul District of Azerbaijan. It has a population of 1,837.
