= Təzəkənd, Lankaran =

Təzəkənd
- Location within Azerbaijan
- Coordinates: 38°39′N 48°50′E
- Country: Azerbaijan
- Rayon: Lankaran
- Time zone: UTC+4 (AZT)
  - Summer (DST): UTC+5 (AZT)

Təzəkənd (also, Tazakend) is a village in the Lankaran Rayon of Azerbaijan.
