= Tolimkhan-e Sofla =

Tolimkhan-e Sofla تليم خان سفلي
- Village
- Location within Iran
- Coordinates: 39°25′22″N 44°47′42″E
- Country: Iran
- Province: West Azerbaijan
- County: Maku
- Bakhsh: Central
- Rural District: Chaybasar-e Jonubi

Population (2006)
  - Total: 97
- Time zone: UTC+3:30 (IRST)
  - Summer (DST): UTC+4:30 (IRDT)

Tolimkhan-e Sofla (Persian: تليم خان سفلي, also Romanized as Tolīmkhān-e Soflá; also known as Tāzeh Kand-e Towlīm Khān and Towlīm Khān-e Pā'īn) is a village in Chaybasar-e Jonubi Rural District, in the Central District of Maku County, West Azerbaijan Province, Iran. At the 2006 census, its population was 97 in 20 families.
