= Alov (surname) =

Alov (Russian: Алов) is a Russian masculine surname, its feminine counterpart is Alova. Notable people with the surname include:

- Aleksandr Alov (1923–1983), Russian film director and screenwriter
- Arkadi Alov (1914–1982), Russian football player
