= Təzəkənd, Zardab =

Təzəkənd
- Municipality
- Location within Azerbaijan
- Coordinates: 40°12′N 47°44′E
- Country: Azerbaijan
- Rayon: Zardab

Population
  - Total: 1,131
- Time zone: UTC+4 (AZT)
  - Summer (DST): UTC+5 (AZT)

Təzəkənd (also, Tazakend) is a village and municipality in the Zardab Rayon of Azerbaijan. It has a population of 1,131.
