= Təzəkənd, Masally =

Təzəkənd
- Municipality
- Location within Azerbaijan
- Coordinates: 38°57′29″N 48°48′14″E
- Country: Azerbaijan
- Rayon: Masally

Population
  - Total: 2,529
- Time zone: UTC+4 (AZT)
  - Summer (DST): UTC+5 (AZT)

Təzəkənd (also, Tazakend) is a village and municipality in the Masally Rayon of Azerbaijan. It has a population of 300 000.
