= Təzəkənd, Davachi =

Təzəkənd
- Municipality
- Location within Azerbaijan
- Coordinates: 41°20′32″N 48°53′30″E
- Country: Azerbaijan
- Rayon: Davachi
- Time zone: UTC+4 (AZT)
  - Summer (DST): UTC+5 (AZT)

Təzəkənd (also, Tazakend) is a village and municipality in the Davachi Rayon of Azerbaijan. The municipality consists of the villages of Təzəkənd, Qaraçaylı, Udullu, and Xırdaoymaq.
