= Təzəkənd, Bilasuvar =

Təzəkənd
- Location within Azerbaijan
- Coordinates: 39°21′23″N 48°35′18″E
- Country: Azerbaijan
- Rayon: Bilasuvar
- Time zone: UTC+4 (AZT)
  - Summer (DST): UTC+5 (AZT)

Təzəkənd is a village in the Bilasuvar Rayon of Azerbaijan.
