= Təzəkənd, Maxta =

Təzəkənd
- Location within Azerbaijan
- Coordinates: 39°36′N 44°55′E
- Country: Azerbaijan
- Autonomous republic: Nakhchivan
- District: Sharur
- Municipality: Maxta
- Time zone: UTC+4 (AZT)
  - Summer (DST): UTC+5 (AZT)

Təzəkənd (also, Tazakend and Ortlu-Tazakend) is a village in the Sharur District of Nakhchivan, Azerbaijan. The village forms part of the municipality of Maxta.
