= Təzəkənd, Jalilabad =

Təzəkənd
- Municipality
- Location within Azerbaijan
- Coordinates: 39°19′34″N 48°28′08″E
- Country: Azerbaijan
- Rayon: Jalilabad
- Time zone: UTC+4 (AZT)

Təzəkənd (also, Tazakend) is a village and municipality in the Jalilabad Rayon of Azerbaijan.
