= Sarajuy-ye Gharbi Rural District =

Rural district in East Azerbaijan province, Iran

Sarajuy-ye Gharbi Rural District Persian: دهستان سراجوئ غربي
- Rural District
- Location within Iran
- Coordinates: 37°33′N 46°17′E
- Country: Iran
- Province: East Azerbaijan
- County: Maragheh
- District: Central
- Established: 1987
- Capital: Alavian

Population (2016)
  - Total: 24,465
- Time zone: UTC+3:30 (IRST)

Sarajuy-ye Gharbi Rural District (Persian: دهستان سراجوئ غربي) is in the Central District of Maragheh County, East Azerbaijan province, Iran. Its capital is the village of Alavian.

== Demographics ==
=== Population ===
At the time of the 2006 National Census, the rural district's population was 21,577 in 5,306 households. There were 23,836 inhabitants in 6,569 households at the following census of 2011. The 2016 census measured the population of the rural district as 24,465 in 7,067 households. The most populous of its 25 villages was Taleb Khan, with 2,848 people.

=== Other villages in the rural district ===
- Ahaq
- Ashan
- Behnaq
- Chavan-e Olya
- Chavan-e Sofla
- Esfehanjiq
- Hajji Kord
- Kahaq
- Nova
- Qarah Borqa
- Tazeh Kand-e Qeshlaq
