= Təzəkənd, Kangarli =

Təzəkənd
- Municipality
- Location within Azerbaijan
- Coordinates: 39°23′36″N 45°17′57″E
- Country: Azerbaijan
- Autonomous republic: Nakhchivan
- District: Kangarli

Population (2005)
  - Total: 516
- Time zone: UTC+4 (AZT)

Təzəkənd (anglicized as Tazakend) is a village and municipality in the Kangarli District of Azerbaijan's Nakhchivan Autonomous Republic. It is located on the left side of the Ordubad-Nakhchivan highway, 38 km in the north-west from the district center, on the slope of the Daralayaz ridge.

Its population is busy with grain-growing and animal husbandry. There are a secondary school, club and a medical center in the village. It has a population of 516. There are settlements and a necropolis of the end of the Bronze Age and early Iron Age (1–2 millennia BC) near the village.

== History ==
The families who lived in the village of Çalxanqala have been forced to move due to clashes between local Azerbaijanis and Armenians and settled in the current village area. As the village had been newly settled, it was named Təzəkənd (the new village).

== Notable people ==
- Manuk Abeghyan
