= Təzəkənd, Sharur =

Təzəkənd
- Municipality
- Location within Azerbaijan
- Coordinates: 39°24′41″N 45°01′23″E
- Country: Azerbaijan
- Autonomous republic: Nakhchivan
- District: Sharur

Population (2005)
  - Total: 260
- Time zone: UTC+4 (AZT)

Təzəkənd (also, Tazakend) is a village and municipality in the Sharur District of Nakhchivan Autonomous Republic, Azerbaijan. It is located 29 km away from the district center, near of the Araz River. Its population is busy with farming and animal husbandry. It has a population of 260. Its former name was Sərdarabad (Sardarabad ), later it has been renamed as Təzəkənd (New village).
