= Qareh Naz Rural District =

Rural district in East Azerbaijan province, Iran

Qareh Naz Rural District Persian: دهستان قره ناز
- Rural District
- Location within Iran
- Coordinates: 37°19′N 46°14′E
- Country: Iran
- Province: East Azerbaijan
- County: Maragheh
- District: Central
- Established: 1987
- Capital: Varjavi

Population (2016)
  - Total: 15,602
- Time zone: UTC+3:30 (IRST)

Qareh Naz Rural District (Persian: دهستان قره ناز) is in the Central District of Maragheh County, East Azerbaijan province, Iran. Its capital is the village of Varjavi.

== Demographics ==
=== Population ===
At the time of the 2006 National Census, the rural district's population was 14,491 in 3,705 households. There were 15,720 inhabitants in 3,992 households at the following census of 2011. The 2016 census measured the population of the rural district as 15,602 in 4,094 households. The most populous of its 18 villages was Eslami Emam Reza Garrison, with 4,562 people.

=== Other villages in the rural district ===
- Ekis
- Khaneqah
- Musa Daraq
- Narjabad
- Qaleh Khaleseh
- Serej
