= Sarajuy-ye Shomali Rural District =

Rural district in East Azerbaijan province, Iran

Sarajuy-ye Shomali Rural District Persian: دهستان سراجوئ شمالي
- Rural District
- Location within Iran
- Coordinates: 37°29′N 46°27′E
- Country: Iran
- Province: East Azerbaijan
- County: Maragheh
- District: Central
- Established: 1987
- Capital: Dash Atan

Population (2016)
  - Total: 25,650
- Time zone: UTC+3:30 (IRST)

Sarajuy-ye Shomali Rural District (Persian: دهستان سراجوئ شمالي) is in the Central District of Maragheh County, East Azerbaijan province, Iran. Its capital is the village of Dash Atan.

== Demographics ==
=== Population ===
At the time of the 2006 National Census, the rural district's population was 22,664 in 5,196 households. There were 24,479 inhabitants in 6,805 households at the following census of 2011. The 2016 census measured the population of the rural district as 25,650 in 7,548 households. The most populous of its 34 villages was Karajabad, with 2,325 people.

=== Other villages in the rural district ===
- Chavan Bagh
- Chekan
- Gol Tappeh
- Kahjuq
- Kordeh Deh
- Moghanjiq
- Qaratlu
- Qartavol
- Sargezeh
- Shalilvand
- Yengejeh
