= Central District (Maragheh County) =

District in East Azerbaijan province, Iran

Central District (Maragheh County) Persian: بخش مرکزی شهرستان مراغه
- District
- Location within Iran
- Coordinates: 37°30′N 46°19′E
- Country: Iran
- Province: East Azerbaijan
- County: Maragheh
- Capital: Maragheh

Population (2016)
  - Total: 240,972
- Time zone: UTC+3:30 (IRST)

The Central District of Maragheh County (Persian: بخش مرکزی شهرستان مراغه) is in East Azerbaijan province, Iran. Its capital is the city of Maragheh.

== Demographics ==
=== Population ===
At the time of the 2006 National Census, the district's population was 205,137 in 53,098 households. The following census in 2011 counted 226,310 people in 64,918 households. The 2016 census measured the population of the district as 240,972 inhabitants in 73,667 households.

=== Administrative divisions ===
Central District (Maragheh County) Population
| Administrative Divisions | 2006 | 2011 | 2016 |
|---|---|---|---|
| Qareh Naz RD | 14,491 | 15,720 | 15,602 |
| Sarajuy-ye Gharbi RD | 21,577 | 23,836 | 24,465 |
| Sarajuy-ye Shomali RD | 22,664 | 24,479 | 25,650 |
| Maragheh (city) | 146,405 | 162,275 | 175,255 |
| Total | 205,137 | 226,310 | 240,972 |
RD = Rural District
