= Jeyran (disambiguation) =

Jeyran is a village in Kurdistan Province, Iran.

Jeyran (Persian: جيران) may also refer to:

== Places ==
- Jeyran Bolagh
- Jeyran Bolaghi (disambiguation)
- Jeyran Darreh
- Jeyran-e Olya (disambiguation)
- Jeyran-e Sofla (disambiguation)

== People ==
- Jeyran (wife of Naser al-Din Shah)
- Jeyran Sharif, Iranian actress
