= Hajji Kandi =

Hajji Kandi and Haji Kandi (Persian: حاجي كندي) may refer to:

- Hajji Kandi, East Azerbaijan
- Hajji Kandi-ye Olya, East Azerbaijan Province
- Hajji Kandi-ye Sofla, East Azerbaijan Province
- Hajji Kandi, West Azerbaijan
- Hajji Kandi, Bukan, West Azerbaijan Province
- Hajji Kandi, Zanjan
