= Kargartan =

Kargartan كرگرتان
- Village
- Location within Iran
- Coordinates: 37°09′10″N 46°34′33″E
- Country: Iran
- Province: East Azerbaijan
- County: Maragheh
- Bakhsh: Saraju
- Rural District: Quri Chay-ye Gharbi

Population (2006)
  - Total: 109
- Time zone: UTC+3:30 (IRST)
  - Summer (DST): UTC+4:30 (IRDT)

Kargartan (Persian: كرگرتان, also Romanized as Kargartān; also known as Karkartān and Kūrtān) is a village in Quri Chay-ye Gharbi Rural District, Saraju District, Maragheh County, East Azerbaijan Province, Iran. At the 2006 census, its population was 109, in 22 families.
