= Bolbol, East Azerbaijan =

Bolbol بلبل
- Village
- Location within Iran
- Coordinates: 37°04′01″N 46°37′36″E
- Country: Iran
- Province: East Azerbaijan
- County: Maragheh
- Bakhsh: Saraju
- Rural District: Quri Chay-ye Gharbi

Population (2006)
  - Total: 133
- Time zone: UTC+3:30 (IRST)
  - Summer (DST): UTC+4:30 (IRDT)

Bolbol (Persian: بلبل, also Romanized as Belbel) is a village in Quri Chay-ye Gharbi Rural District, Saraju District, Maragheh County, East Azerbaijan Province, Iran. At the 2006 census, its population was 133, in 31 families.
