= Bali Qayah =

Bali Qayah بالي قيه
- Village
- Location within Iran
- Coordinates: 37°05′21″N 46°34′35″E
- Country: Iran
- Province: East Azerbaijan
- County: Maragheh
- Bakhsh: Saraju
- Rural District: Quri Chay-ye Gharbi

Population (2006)
  - Total: 152
- Time zone: UTC+3:30 (IRST)
  - Summer (DST): UTC+4:30 (IRDT)

Bali Qayah (Persian: بالي قيه, also Romanized as Bālī Qayah; also known as Bālā Qayah) is a village in Quri Chay-ye Gharbi Rural District, Saraju District, Maragheh County, East Azerbaijan Province, Iran. At the 2006 census, its population was 152, in 36 families.
