= Shakhtehlu =

Shakhtehlu شخته لو
- Village
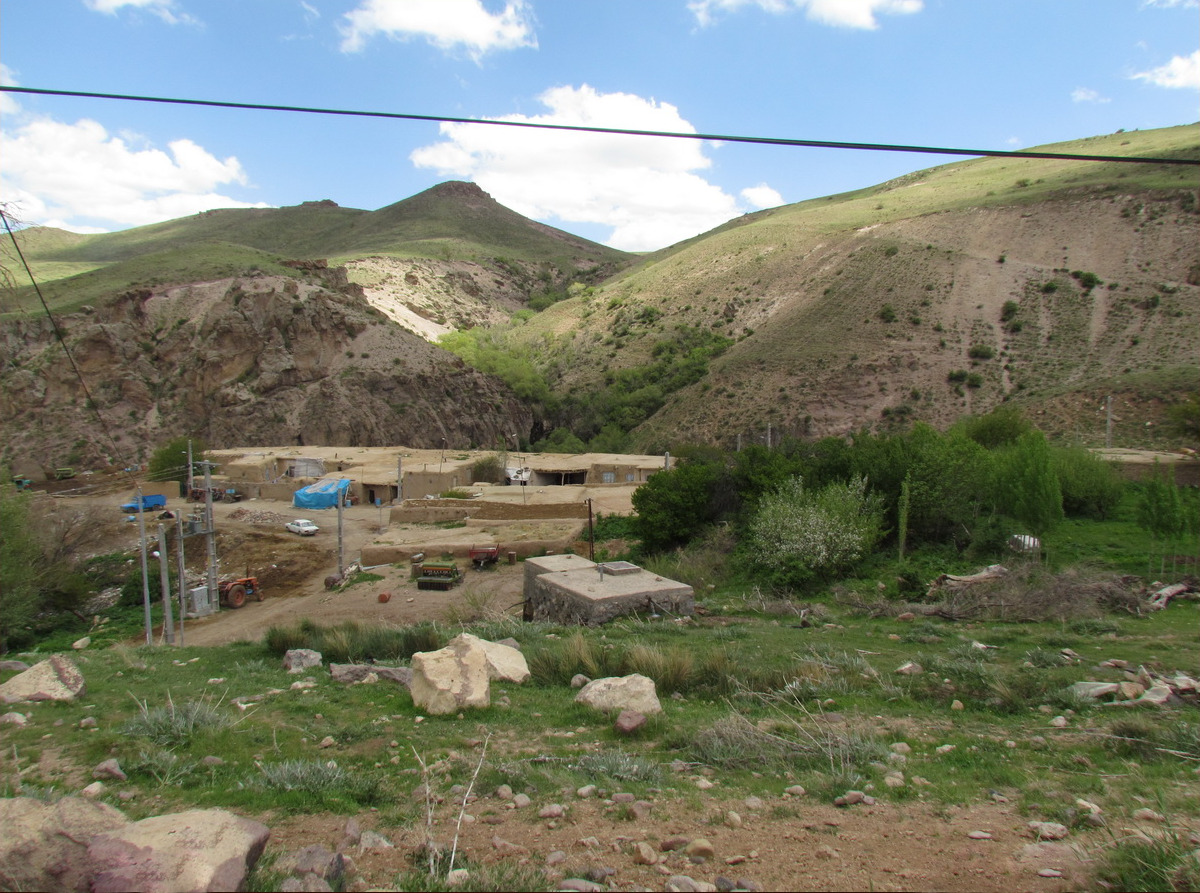

- Location within Iran
- Coordinates: 37°12′35″N 46°33′36″E
- Country: Iran
- Province: East Azerbaijan
- County: Maragheh
- Bakhsh: Saraju
- Rural District: Quri Chay-ye Gharbi

Population (2006)
  - Total: 40
- Time zone: UTC+3:30 (IRST)
  - Summer (DST): UTC+4:30 (IRDT)

Shakhtehlu (Persian: شخته لو, also Romanized as Shakhtehlū) is a village in Quri Chay-ye Gharbi Rural District, Saraju District, Maragheh County, East Azerbaijan Province, Iran. At the 2006 census, its population was 40, in 6 families.
