= Bagh Yeri =

Bagh Yeri باغ يري
- Village
- Location within Iran
- Coordinates: 37°12′36″N 46°37′29″E
- Country: Iran
- Province: East Azerbaijan
- County: Maragheh
- Bakhsh: Saraju
- Rural District: Quri Chay-ye Gharbi

Population (2006)
  - Total: 40
- Time zone: UTC+3:30 (IRST)
  - Summer (DST): UTC+4:30 (IRDT)

Bagh Yeri (Persian: باغ يري, also Romanized as Bāgh Yerī; also known as Bāgh Barī) is a village in Quri Chay-ye Gharbi Rural District, Saraju District, Maragheh County, East Azerbaijan Province, Iran. At the 2006 census, its population was 40, in 9 families.
