= Dorraj-e Olya =

Dorraj-e Olya دراج عليا
- Village
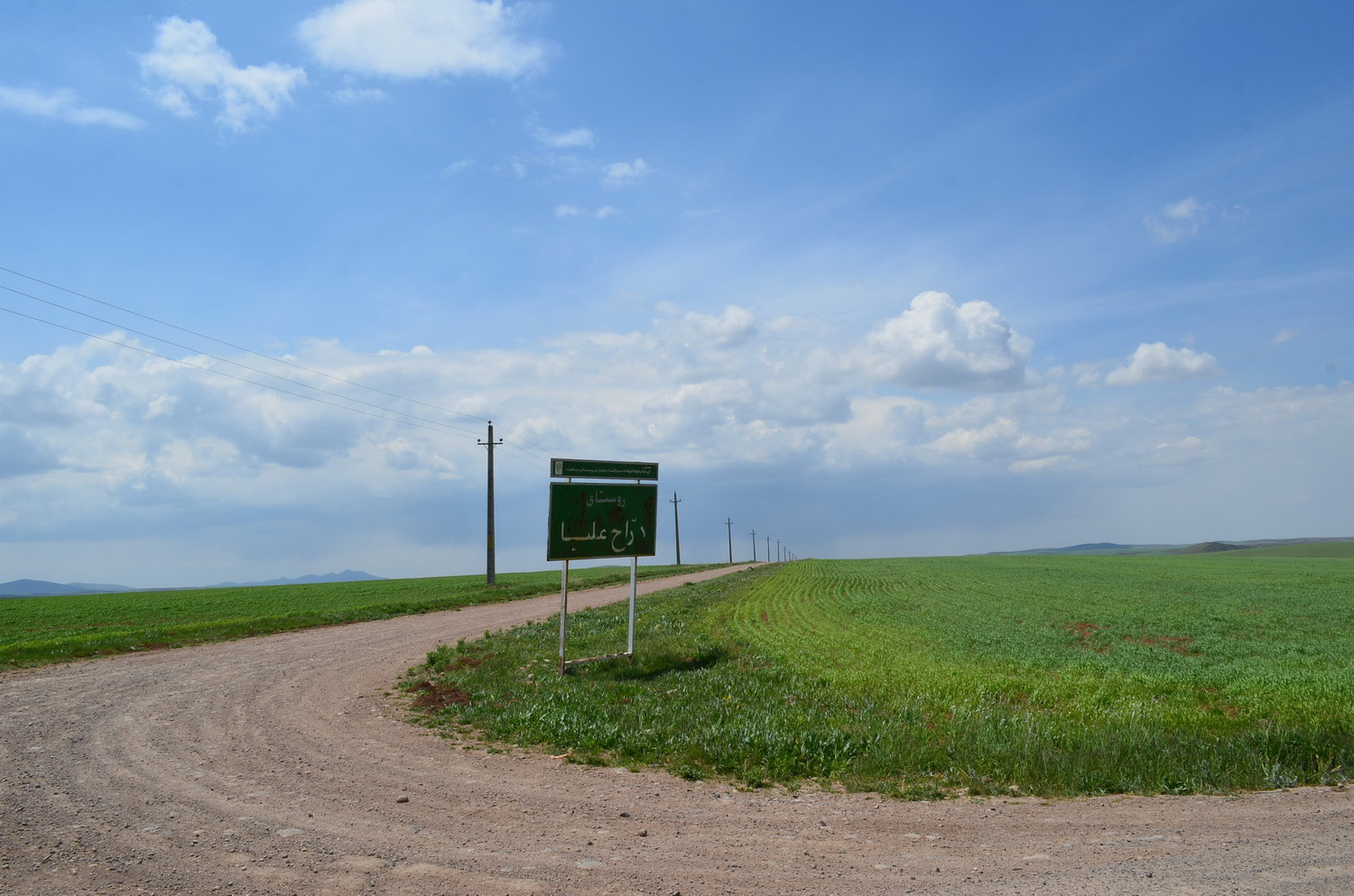
- Panoramic view of the village

- Location within Iran
- Coordinates: 37°11′32″N 46°40′57″E
- Country: Iran
- Province: East Azerbaijan
- County: Maragheh
- Bakhsh: Saraju
- Rural District: Quri Chay-ye Gharbi

Population (2006)
  - Total: 41
- Time zone: UTC+3:30 (IRST)
  - Summer (DST): UTC+4:30 (IRDT)

Dorraj-e Olya (Persian: دراج عليا, also Romanized as Dorrāj-e ‘Olyā and Dorāj-e ‘Olyā) is a village in Quri Chay-ye Gharbi Rural District, Saraju District, Maragheh County, East Azerbaijan Province, Iran. At the 2006 census, its population was 41, in 9 families.
