= Qarah Kand =

Qarah Kand or Qareh Kand (Persian: قراه كند) may refer to various places in Iran:

- Qarah Kand, Charuymaq, East Azerbaijan Province
- Qarah Kand, Maragheh, East Azerbaijan Province
- Qareh Kand-e Khotb, Maragheh County, East Azerbaijan Province
- Qareh Kand-e Musavi, Maragheh County, East Azerbaijan Province
- Qarah Kand, Asadabad, Hamadan Province
- Qarah Kand, Razan, Hamadan Province
- Qareh Kand, West Azerbaijan
