= Guyjeh =

Guyjeh or Gowyjeh (Persian: گويجه), also rendered as Gowjeh, may refer to:

- Guyjeh Qaleh (disambiguation)
- Guyjeh Qayah
- Gowyjeh Qomlaq (disambiguation)
- Guyjeh-ye Soltan
- Guyjeh, Kermanshah
