= Qarajeh Qayah =

Qarajeh Qayah or Qarajeh Qayeh (Persian: قراجه قيه) may refer to:

- Qarajeh Qayah, Hashtrud
- Qarajeh Qayeh, Maragheh
- Qarajeh Qayeh, Meyaneh
