= Sari Qeshlaq-e Olya =

Sari Qeshlaq-e Olya ساري قشلاق عليا
- Village
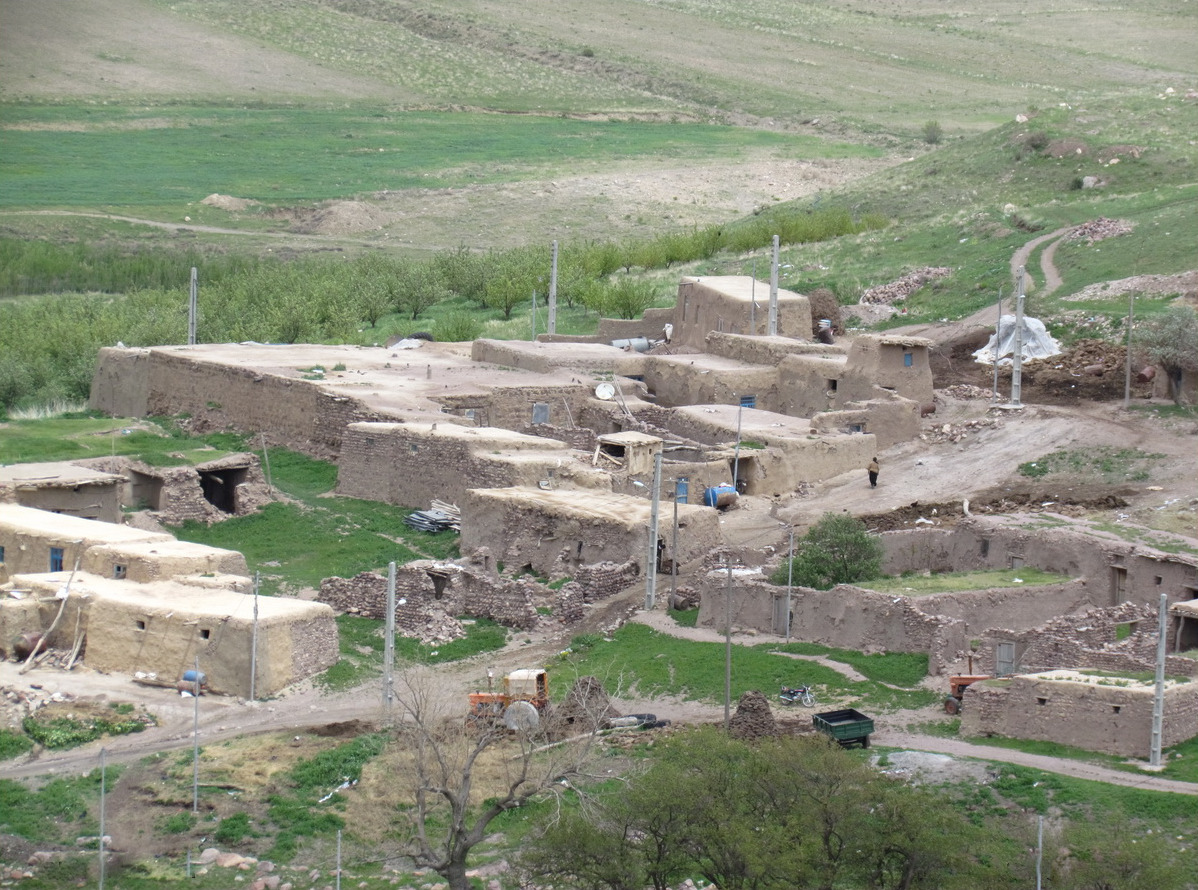

- Location within Iran
- Coordinates: 37°13′04″N 46°33′29″E
- Country: Iran
- Province: East Azerbaijan
- County: Maragheh
- Bakhsh: Saraju
- Rural District: Quri Chay-ye Gharbi

Population (2006)
  - Total: 30
- Time zone: UTC+3:30 (IRST)
  - Summer (DST): UTC+4:30 (IRDT)

Sari Qeshlaq-e Olya (Persian: ساري قشلاق عليا, also Romanized as Sārī Qeshlāq-e ‘Olyā) is a village in Quri Chay-ye Gharbi Rural District, Saraju District, Maragheh County, East Azerbaijan Province, Iran. At the 2006 census, its population was 30, in 5 families.
