= Urta Qeshlaq-e Olya =

Urta Qeshlaq-e Olya اورتاقشلاق عليا
- Village
- Location within Iran
- Coordinates: 37°02′29″N 46°31′09″E
- Country: Iran
- Province: East Azerbaijan
- County: Maragheh
- Bakhsh: Saraju
- Rural District: Quri Chay-ye Gharbi

Population (2006)
  - Total: 213
- Time zone: UTC+3:30 (IRST)
  - Summer (DST): UTC+4:30 (IRDT)

Urta Qeshlaq-e Olya (Persian: اورتاقشلاق عليا, also Romanized as Ūrtā Qeshlāq-e ‘Olyā; also known as Ūrtā Qeshlāq) is a village in Quri Chay-ye Gharbi Rural District, Saraju District, Maragheh County, East Azerbaijan Province, Iran. At the 2006 census, its population was 213, in 36 families.
