= Sheykh Jan =

Village in East Azerbaijan, Iran

Sheykh Jan شيخجان
- Village
- Location within Iran
- Coordinates: 37°16′34″N 46°31′22″E
- Country: Iran
- Province: East Azerbaijan
- County: Maragheh
- Bakhsh: Saraju
- Rural District: Sarajuy-ye Sharqi

Population (2006)
  - Total: 250
- Time zone: UTC+3:30 (IRST)
  - Summer (DST): UTC+4:30 (IRDT)

Sheykh Jan (Persian: شيخجان, also Romanized as Sheykh Jān) is a village in Sarajuy-ye Sharqi Rural District, Saraju District, Maragheh County, East Azerbaijan Province, Iran. At the 2006 census, its population was 250, in 53 families.
