= Quyun Qeshlaq =

Quyun Qeshlaq قويون قشلاق
- Village
- Location within Iran
- Coordinates: 37°12′12″N 46°31′23″E
- Country: Iran
- Province: East Azerbaijan
- County: Maragheh
- Bakhsh: Saraju
- Rural District: Quri Chay-ye Gharbi

Population (2006)
  - Total: 36
- Time zone: UTC+3:30 (IRST)
  - Summer (DST): UTC+4:30 (IRDT)

Quyun Qeshlaq (Persian: قويون قشلاق, also Romanized as Qūyūn Qeshlāq) is a village in Quri Chay-ye Gharbi Rural District, Saraju District, Maragheh County, East Azerbaijan Province, Iran. At the 2006 census, its population was 36, in 8 families.
