= Minbash-e Hesarlu =

Minbash-e Hesarlu مين باش حصارلو
- Village
- Location within Iran
- Coordinates: 37°04′38″N 46°31′31″E
- Country: Iran
- Province: East Azerbaijan
- County: Maragheh
- Bakhsh: Saraju
- Rural District: Quri Chay-ye Gharbi

Population (2006)
  - Total: 79
- Time zone: UTC+3:30 (IRST)
  - Summer (DST): UTC+4:30 (IRDT)

Minbash-e Hesarlu (Persian: مين باش حصارلو, also Romanized as Mīnbāsh-e Ḩeşārlū; also known as Mīnbāsh Ḩeşārī) is a village in Quri Chay-ye Gharbi Rural District, Saraju District, Maragheh County, East Azerbaijan Province, Iran. At the 2006 census, its population was 79, in 19 families.
