= Shah Verdi Kandi =

Coordinates: 37°20′33″N 46°36′21″E

Shah Verdi Kandi شاه وردي كندي
- Village
- Interactive map of Shah Verdi Kandi
- Country: Iran
- Province: East Azerbaijan
- County: Maragheh
- Bakhsh: Saraju
- Rural District: Sarajuy-ye Sharqi

Population (2006)
  - Total: 171
- Time zone: UTC+3:30 (IRST)
  - Summer (DST): UTC+4:30 (IRDT)

Shah Verdi Kandi (Persian: شاه وردي كندي, also Romanized as Shāh Verdī Kandī) is a village in Sarajuy-ye Sharqi Rural District, Saraju District, Maragheh County, East Azerbaijan Province, Iran. At the 2006 census, its population was 171, in 29 families.
