= Sarkarabad =

Sarkarabad سركاراباد
- Village
- Location within Iran
- Coordinates: 37°12′51″N 46°24′53″E
- Country: Iran
- Province: East Azerbaijan
- County: Maragheh
- Bakhsh: Saraju
- Rural District: Sarajuy-ye Jonubi

Population (2006)
  - Total: 168
- Time zone: UTC+3:30 (IRST)
  - Summer (DST): UTC+4:30 (IRDT)

Sarkarabad (Persian: سركاراباد, also Romanized as Sarkārābād) is a village in Sarajuy-ye Jonubi Rural District, Saraju District, Maragheh County, East Azerbaijan Province, Iran. At the 2006 census, its population was 168, in 40 families.
