= Chalelu Chelbianlu =

Chalelu Chelbianlu چاللوچلبيانلو
- Village
- Location within Iran
- Coordinates: 37°09′06″N 46°27′36″E
- Country: Iran
- Province: East Azerbaijan
- County: Maragheh
- Bakhsh: Saraju
- Rural District: Quri Chay-ye Gharbi

Population (2006)
  - Total: 161
- Time zone: UTC+3:30 (IRST)
  - Summer (DST): UTC+4:30 (IRDT)

Chalelu Chelbianlu (Persian: چاللوچلبيانلو, also Romanized as Chālelū Chelbīānlū; also known as Chālelū Bārlānlū and Chāllū Bārānlū) is a village in Quri Chay-ye Gharbi Rural District, Saraju District, Maragheh County, East Azerbaijan Province, Iran. At the 2006 census, its population was 161, in 20 families.
