= Jahangir Kandi =

Jahangir Kandi جهانگيركندي
- Village
- Location within Iran
- Coordinates: 37°01′27″N 46°29′57″E
- Country: Iran
- Province: East Azerbaijan
- County: Maragheh
- Bakhsh: Saraju
- Rural District: Quri Chay-ye Gharbi

Population (2006)
  - Total: 97
- Time zone: UTC+3:30 (IRST)
  - Summer (DST): UTC+4:30 (IRDT)

Jahangir Kandi (Persian: جهانگيركندي, also Romanized as Jahāngīr Kandī) is a village in Quri Chay-ye Gharbi Rural District, Saraju District, Maragheh County, East Azerbaijan Province, Iran. At the 2006 census, its population was 97, in 21 families.
