= Molla Qasem =

Molla Qasem (Persian: ملاقاسم) may refer to:

- Molla Qasem, Bostanabad, East Azerbaijan Province
- Molla Qasem, Maragheh, East Azerbaijan Province
- Molla Qasem, Sistan and Baluchestan
