= Chelan-e Sofla =

Chelan-e Sofla چلان سفلي
- Village
- Location within Iran
- Coordinates: 37°22′07″N 46°32′55″E
- Country: Iran
- Province: East Azerbaijan
- County: Maragheh
- Bakhsh: Saraju
- Rural District: Sarajuy-ye Sharqi

Population (2006)
  - Total: 697
- Time zone: UTC+3:30 (IRST)
  - Summer (DST): UTC+4:30 (IRDT)

Chelan-e Sofla (Persian: چلان سفلي, also Romanized as Chelān-e Soflá) is a village in Sarajuy-ye Sharqi Rural District, Saraju District, Maragheh County, East Azerbaijan Province, Iran. At the 2006 census, its population was 697, in 136 families.
