= Karamjavan =

Village in East Azerbaijan province, Iran

Karamjavan Persian: كرمجوان
- Village
- Location within Iran
- Coordinates: 37°22′21″N 46°30′39″E
- Country: Iran
- Province: East Azerbaijan
- County: Maragheh
- District: Saraju
- Rural District: Sarajuy-ye Sharqi

Population (2016)
  - Total: 2,584
- Time zone: UTC+3:30 (IRST)

Karamjavan (Persian: كرمجوان) (Note: Also romanized as Karamjavān) is a village in Sarajuy-ye Sharqi Rural District of Saraju District in Maragheh County, East Azerbaijan province, Iran.

== Demographics ==
=== Population ===
At the time of the 2006 National Census, the village's population was 2,262 in 506 households. The following census in 2011 counted 2,425 people in 656 households. The 2016 census measured the population of the village as 2,584 people in 737 households. It was the most populous village in its rural district.
