= Chonaq Bolagh-e Olya =

Chonaq Bolagh-e Olya چناقبلاغ عليا
- Village
- Location within Iran
- Coordinates: 37°09′08″N 46°36′51″E
- Country: Iran
- Province: East Azerbaijan
- County: Maragheh
- Bakhsh: Saraju
- Rural District: Quri Chay-ye Gharbi

Population (2006)
  - Total: 78
- Time zone: UTC+3:30 (IRST)
  - Summer (DST): UTC+4:30 (IRDT)

Chonaq Bolagh-e Olya (Persian: چناقبلاغ عليا, also Romanized as Chonāq Bolāgh-e 'Olyā) is a village in Quri Chay-ye Gharbi Rural District, Saraju District, Maragheh County, East Azerbaijan province, Iran. At the 2006 census, its population was 78, in 10 families.
