= Sarajuy =

Sarajuy (Persian: سراجوئ) may refer to:

- Sarajuy-ye Gharbi Rural District
- Sarajuy-ye Jonubi Rural District
- Sarajuy-ye Sharqi Rural District
- Sarajuy-ye Shomali Rural District
