= Gol Tappeh, Maragheh =

Village in East Azerbaijan province, Iran

Gol Tappeh Persian: گل تپه
- Village
- Location within Iran
- Coordinates: 37°15′49″N 46°23′32″E
- Country: Iran
- Province: East Azerbaijan
- County: Maragheh
- District: Saraju
- Rural District: Sarajuy-ye Shomali

Population (2016)
  - Total: 986
- Time zone: UTC+3:30 (IRST)

Gol Tappeh (Persian: گل تپه) is a village in Sarajuy-ye Shomali Rural District of Saraju District in Maragheh County, East Azerbaijan province, Iran. It was the capital of Sarajuy-ye Jonubi Rural District until its capital was transferred to the village of Aghcheh Kohel.

== Demographics ==
=== Population ===
At the time of the 2006 National Census, the village's population was 1,013 in 214 households. The following census in 2011 counted 1,059 people in 313 households. The 2016 census measured the population of the village as 986 people in 315 households.
