= Ganji =

Ganji may refer to:

== People ==
- Akbar Ganji, Iranian journalist
- Manouchehr Ganji, Iranian human rights activist
- Pariyoush Ganji, Iranian painter
- Sadeq Ganji, Iranian politician

== Places ==
- Ganji, East Azerbaijan, Iran
- Ganji, Kurdistan, Iran

== See also ==
- Ganji Bar
- Rice, food staple grain grown in the tropics and subtropics
- Congee, also spelled ganji
