= Sari Qayeh, Maragheh =

Village in East Azerbaijan province, Iran

Sari Qayeh Persian: ساري قيه
- Village
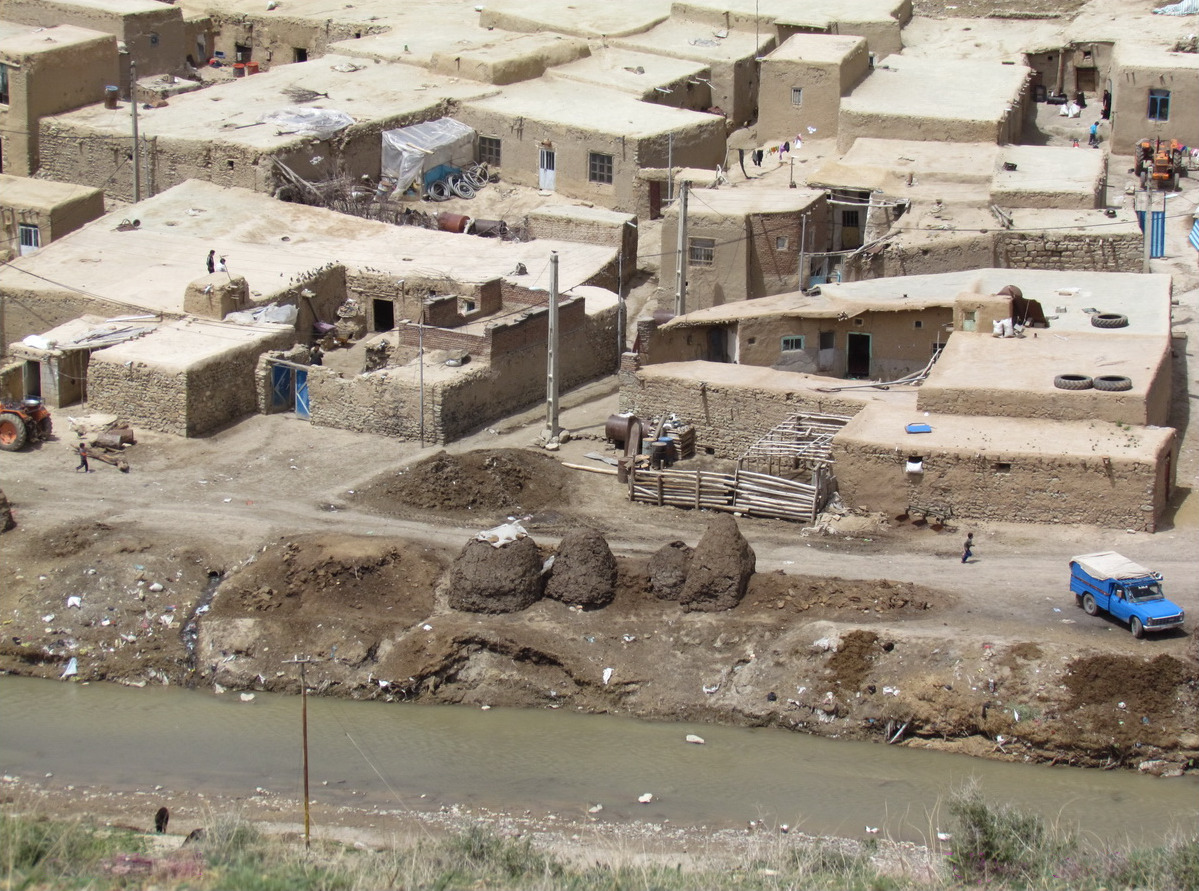
- The village of Sari Qayeh

- Location within Iran
- Coordinates: 37°12′51″N 46°28′44″E
- Country: Iran
- Province: East Azerbaijan
- County: Maragheh
- District: Saraju
- Rural District: Sarajuy-ye Jonubi

Population (2016)
  - Total: 219
- Time zone: UTC+3:30 (IRST)

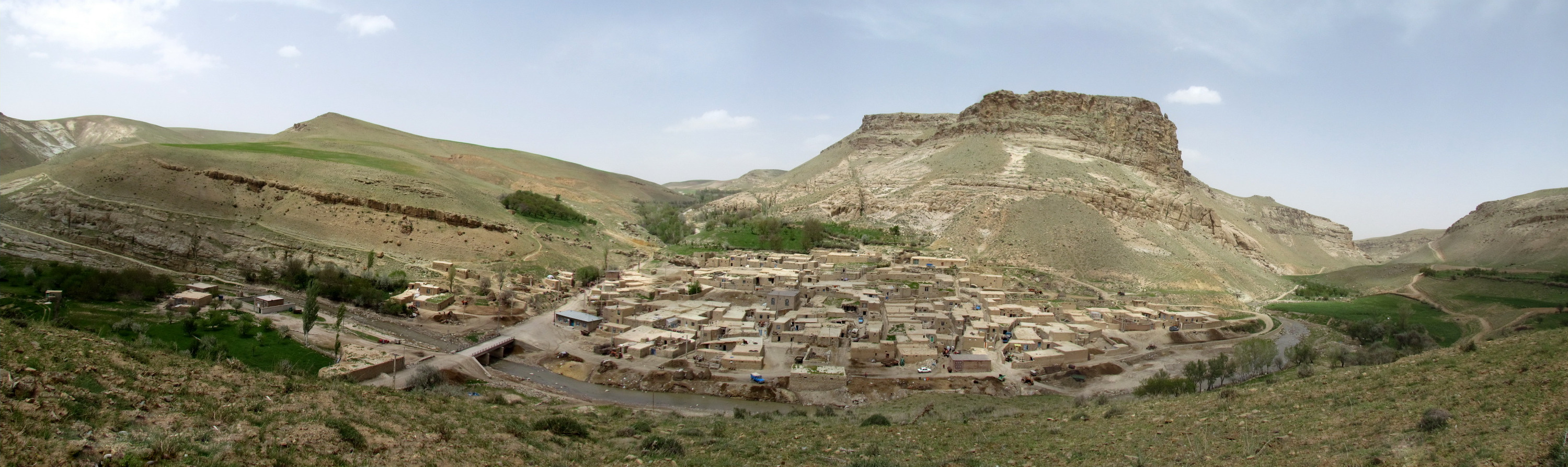
Panorama of the village of Sari Qayeh

Sari Qayeh (Persian: ساري قيه) (Note: Also romanized as Sārī Qayeh) is a village in Sarajuy-ye Jonubi Rural District of Saraju District in Maragheh County, East Azerbaijan province, Iran.

== Demographics ==
=== Population ===
At the time of the 2006 National Census, the village's population was 339 in 63 households. The following census in 2011 counted 291 people in 73 households. The 2016 census measured the population of the village as 219 people in 85 households.
