= Palchoqlu =

Palchoqlu (Persian: پالچقلو) may refer to:

- Palchoqlu, Charuymaq
- Palchoqlu, Maragheh
