= Juki-ye Bizhan =

Juki-ye Bizhan جوكي بيژن
- Village
- Location within Iran
- Coordinates: 37°05′09″N 46°36′46″E
- Country: Iran
- Province: East Azerbaijan
- County: Maragheh
- Bakhsh: Saraju
- Rural District: Quri Chay-ye Gharbi

Population (2006)
  - Total: 22
- Time zone: UTC+3:30 (IRST)
  - Summer (DST): UTC+4:30 (IRDT)

Juki-ye Bizhan (Persian: جوكي بيژن, also Romanized as Jūkī-ye Bīzhan; also known as Chūgī-ye Bīzhan and Jūgī-ye Bīzhan) is a village in Quri Chay-ye Gharbi Rural District, Saraju District, Maragheh County, East Azerbaijan Province, Iran. At the 2006 census, its population was 22, in 4 families.
