= Alelu, Maragheh =

Village in East Azerbaijan, Iran

Alelu اللو
- Village
- Location within Iran
- Coordinates: 37°11′50″N 46°36′23″E
- Country: Iran
- Province: East Azerbaijan
- County: Maragheh
- Bakhsh: Saraju
- Rural District: Quri Chay-ye Gharbi

Population (2006)
  - Total: 30
- Time zone: UTC+3:30 (IRST)
  - Summer (DST): UTC+4:30 (IRDT)

Alelu (Persian: اللو, also romanized as Ālelū; also known as Ālīlū) is a village in Quri Chay-ye Gharbi Rural District, Saraju District, Maragheh County, East Azerbaijan Province, Iran. At the 2006 census, its population was 30, in 5 families.
