= Almachovan =

Village in East Azerbaijan province, Iran

Almachovan Persian: الماچوان
- Village
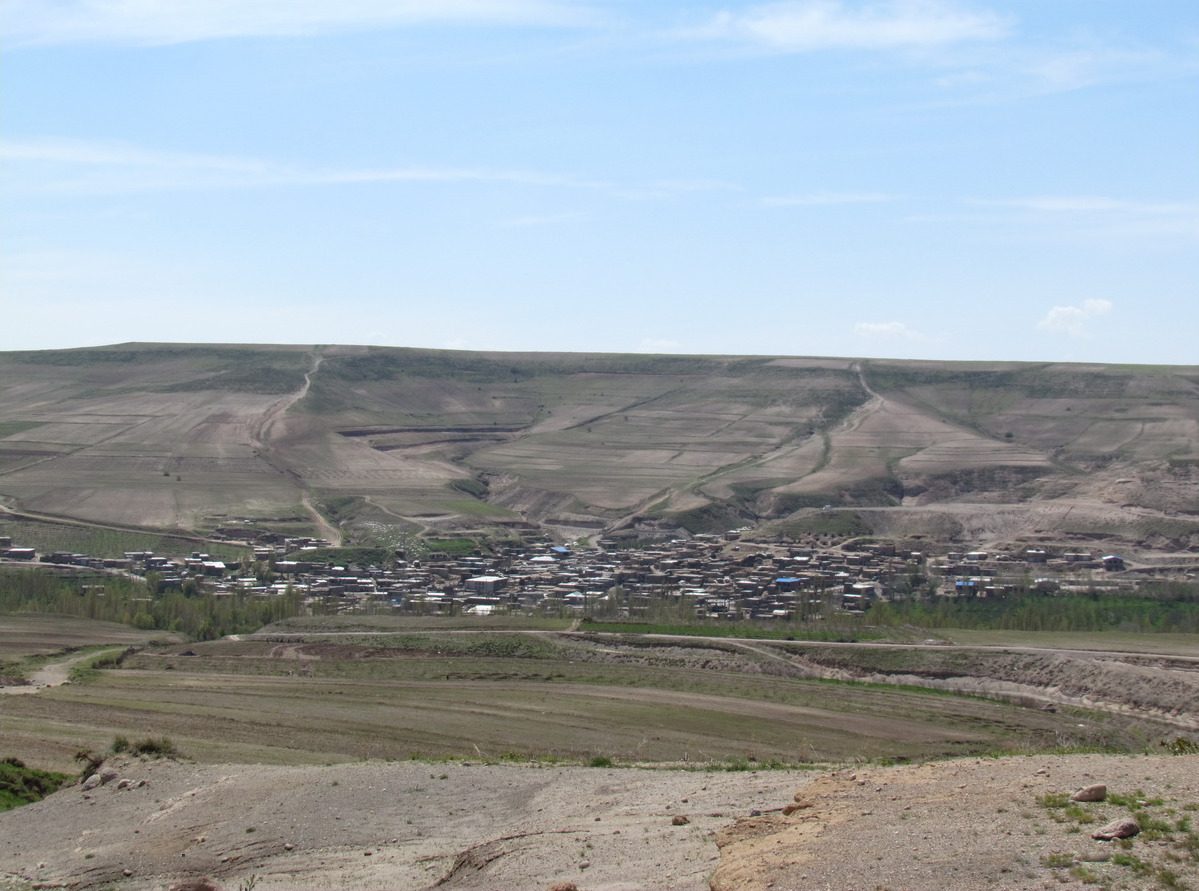
- The village of Almachovan

- Location within Iran
- Coordinates: 37°25′46″N 46°31′02″E
- Country: Iran
- Province: East Azerbaijan
- County: Maragheh
- District: Saraju
- Rural District: Sarajuy-ye Sharqi

Population (2016)
  - Total: 1,476
- Time zone: UTC+3:30 (IRST)

Almachovan (Persian: الماچوان,) (Note: Also romanized as Ālmāchovān) is a village in Sarajuy-ye Sharqi Rural District of Saraju District in Maragheh County, East Azerbaijan province, Iran.

== Demographics ==
=== Population ===
At the time of the 2006 National Census, the village's population was 1,274 in 212 households. The following census in 2011 counted 1,207 people in 310 households. The 2016 census measured the population of the village as 1,476 people in 399 households.
