= Mavaluy =

Mavaluy (Persian: مولوي), also rendered as Mavalu, may refer to:

- Mavaluy-e Olya
- Mavaluy-e Sofla
