= Juki-ye Vosta =

Juki-ye Vosta جوكي وسطي
- Village
- Location within Iran
- Coordinates: 37°03′18″N 46°35′55″E
- Country: Iran
- Province: East Azerbaijan
- County: Maragheh
- Bakhsh: Saraju
- Rural District: Quri Chay-ye Gharbi

Population (2006)
  - Total: 68
- Time zone: UTC+3:30 (IRST)
  - Summer (DST): UTC+4:30 (IRDT)

Juki-ye Vosta (Persian: جوكي وسطي, also Romanized as Jūkī-ye Vosţá; also known as Chūgī-ye Vasaţ and Jūgī-ye Vasaţ) is a village in Quri Chay-ye Gharbi Rural District, Saraju District, Maragheh County, East Azerbaijan Province, Iran. At the 2006 census, its population was 68, in 16 families.
