= Chonaq Bolagh-e Sofla =

Chonaq Bolagh-e Sofla چناقبلاغ سفلي
- Village
- Location within Iran
- Coordinates: 37°10′26″N 46°36′58″E
- Country: Iran
- Province: East Azerbaijan
- County: Maragheh
- Bakhsh: Saraju
- Rural District: Quri Chay-ye Gharbi

Population (2006)
  - Total: 83
- Time zone: UTC+3:30 (IRST)
  - Summer (DST): UTC+4:30 (IRDT)

Chonaq Bolagh-e Sofla (Persian: چناقبلاغ سفلي, also Romanized as Chonāq Bolāgh-e Soflá) is a village in Quri Chay-ye Gharbi Rural District, Saraju District, Maragheh County, East Azerbaijan Province, Iran. At the 2006 census, its population was 83, in 16 families.
