= Bolukabad =

Village in East Azerbaijan province, Iran

Bolukabad Persian: بلوك اباد
- Village
- Location within Iran
- Coordinates: 37°17′36″N 46°33′13″E
- Country: Iran
- Province: East Azerbaijan
- County: Maragheh
- District: Saraju
- Rural District: Sarajuy-ye Sharqi

Population (2016)
  - Total: 729
- Time zone: UTC+3:30 (IRST)

Bolukabad (Persian: بلوك اباد) (Note: Also romanized as Bolūkābād; also known as Belkobad and Bilkābād) is a village in Sarajuy-ye Sharqi Rural District of Saraju District in Maragheh County, East Azerbaijan province, Iran.

== Demographics ==
=== Population ===
At the time of the 2006 National Census, the village's population was 901 in 209 households. The following census in 2011 counted 763 people in 196 households. The 2016 census measured the population of the village as 729 people in 210 households.
