= Dash Bolagh Bazar =

Village in East Azerbaijan province, Iran

Dash Bolagh Bazar Persian: داش بلاغ بازار
- Village
- Location within Iran
- Coordinates: 37°06′58″N 46°34′35″E
- Country: Iran
- Province: East Azerbaijan
- County: Maragheh
- District: Saraju
- Rural District: Quri Chay-ye Gharbi

Population (2016)
  - Total: 238
- Time zone: UTC+3:30 (IRST)

Dash Bolagh Bazar (Persian: داش بلاغ بازار) (Note: Also romanized as Dāsh Bolāgh Bāzār and Dāsh Bolāgh-e Bāzār; also known as Dāsh Bolagh (داش بلاغ)) is a village in, and the capital of, Quri Chay-ye Gharbi Rural District in Saraju District of Maragheh County, East Azerbaijan province, Iran.

== Demographics ==
=== Population ===
At the time of the 2006 National Census, the village's population was 270 in 55 households. The following census in 2011 counted 287 people in 64 households. The 2016 census measured the population of the village as 238 people in 68 households. It was the most populous village in its rural district.
