= Khatab-e Sofla =

Village in East Azerbaijan province, Iran

Khatab-e Sofla Persian: خطب سفلي
- Village
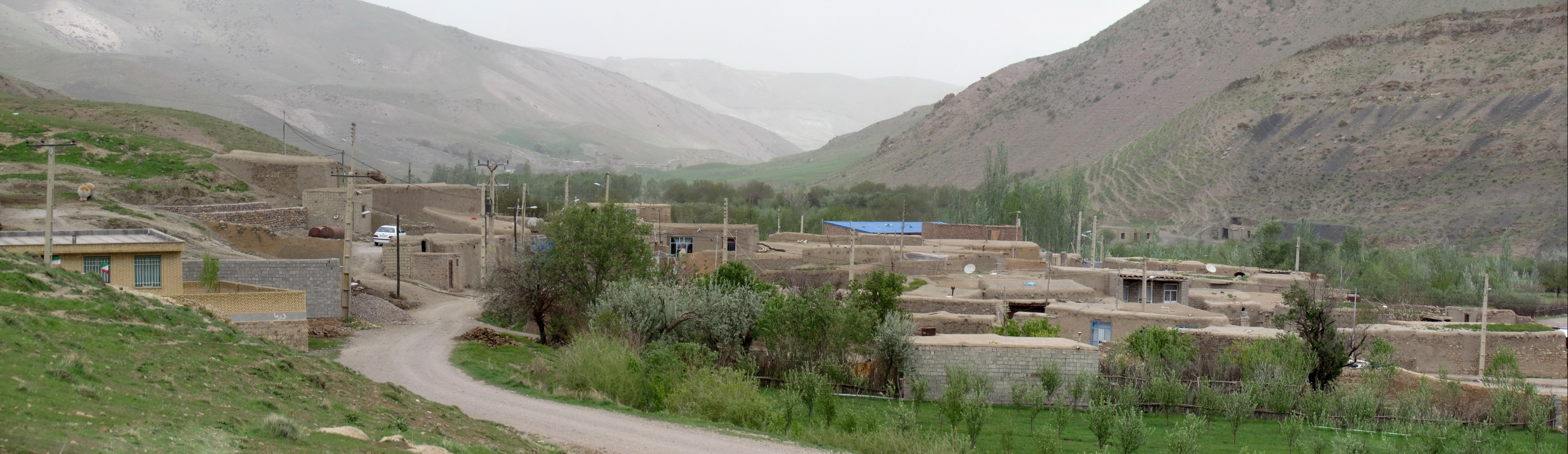
- The village of Khatab-e Sofla

- Location within Iran
- Coordinates: 37°07′51″N 46°26′47″E
- Country: Iran
- Province: East Azerbaijan
- County: Maragheh
- District: Saraju
- Rural District: Quri Chay-ye Gharbi

Population (2016)
  - Total: 191
- Time zone: UTC+3:30 (IRST)

Khatab-e Sofla (Persian: خطب سفلي) (Note: Also romanized as Khaţab-e Soflá; also known as Khaţab (خطب)) is a village in Quri Chay-ye Gharbi Rural District of Saraju District in Maragheh County, East Azerbaijan province, Iran.

== Demographics ==
=== Population ===
At the time of the 2006 National Census, the village's population was 167 in 39 households. The following census in 2011 counted 175 people in 49 households. The 2016 census measured the population of the village as 191 people in 45 households.

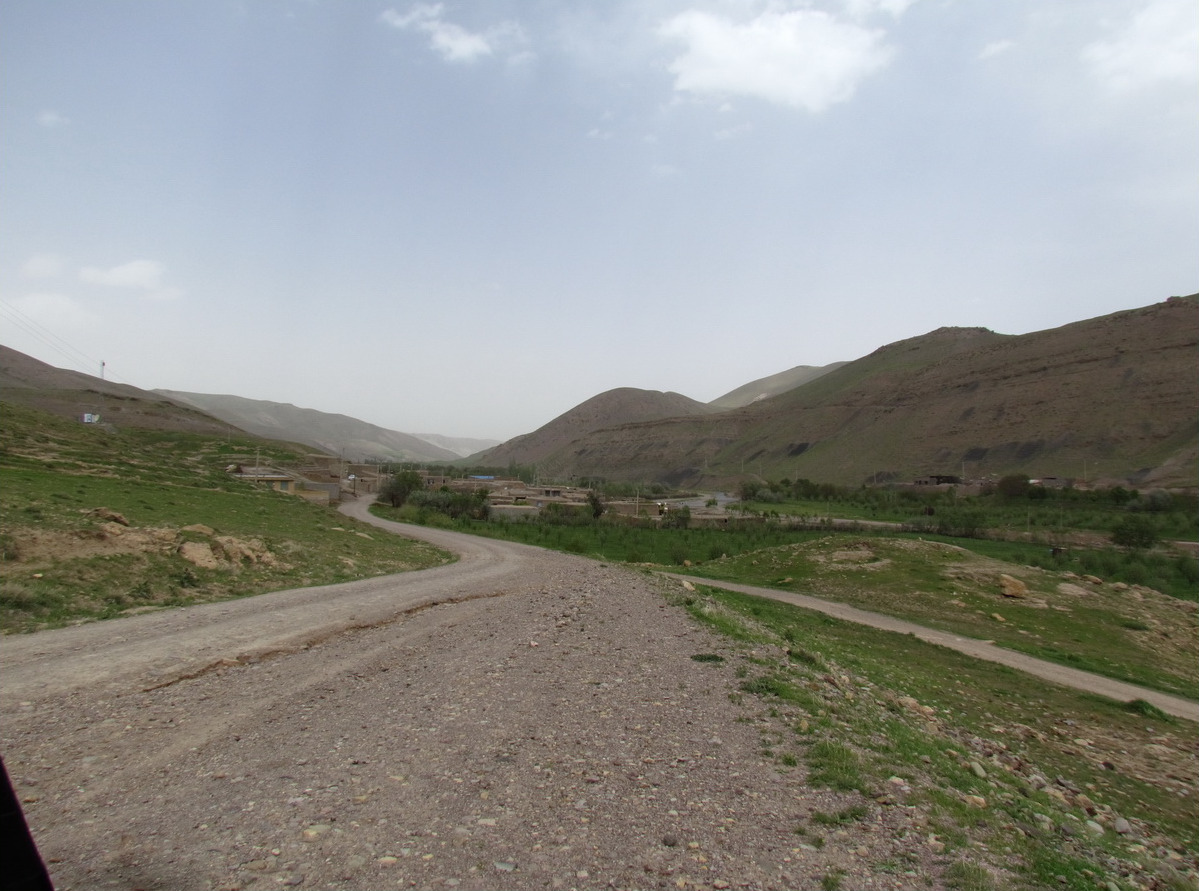
Road to the village of Khatab-e Sofla

== See also ==
Media related to Khatab-e Sofla at Wikimedia Commons
