= Sarujeh, East Azerbaijan =

Village in East Azerbaijan province, Iran

Sarujeh Persian: ساروجه
- Village
- Location within Iran
- Coordinates: 37°07′06″N 46°27′41″E
- Country: Iran
- Province: East Azerbaijan
- County: Maragheh
- District: Saraju
- Rural District: Quri Chay-ye Gharbi

Population (2016)
  - Total: 204
- Time zone: UTC+3:30 (IRST)

Sarujeh (Persian: ساروجه) (Note: Also romanized as Sārūjeh) is a village in Quri Chay-ye Gharbi Rural District of Saraju District in Maragheh County, East Azerbaijan province, Iran.

== Demographics ==
=== Population ===
At the time of the 2006 National Census, the village's population was 179 in 41 households. The following census in 2011 counted 146 people in 45 households. The 2016 census measured the population of the village as 204 people in 66 households.
