= Aghbolagh-e Fotuhi =

Village in East Azerbaijan province, Iran

Aghbolagh-e Fotuhi Persian: اغبلاغ فتوحي
- Village
- Location within Iran
- Coordinates: 37°13′44″N 46°22′49″E
- Country: Iran
- Province: East Azerbaijan
- County: Maragheh
- District: Saraju
- Rural District: Sarajuy-ye Jonubi

Population (2025)
  - Total: 500
- Time zone: UTC+3:30 (IRST)

Aghbolagh-e Fotuhi (Persian: اغبلاغ فتوحي) (Note: Also romanized as Āghbolāgh-e Fotūḩī; also known as Āq Bolāgh and Āqbolāgh-e Fotūḩī) is a village in Sarajuy-ye Jonubi Rural District of Saraju District in Maragheh County, East Azerbaijan province, Iran.

== Demographics ==
=== Population ===
At the time of the 2006 National Census, the village's population was 324 in 62 households. The following census in 2011 counted 465 people in 116 households. The 2016 census measured the population of the village as 409 people in 169 households.
