= Jeyran-e Sofla, East Azerbaijan =

Jeyran-e Sofla جيران سفلي
- Village
- Location within Iran
- Coordinates: 37°19′41″N 46°39′43″E
- Country: Iran
- Province: East Azerbaijan
- County: Maragheh
- Bakhsh: Saraju
- Rural District: Sarajuy-ye Sharqi

Population (2006)
  - Total: 128
- Time zone: UTC+3:30 (IRST)
  - Summer (DST): UTC+4:30 (IRDT)

Jeyran-e Sofla (Persian: جيران سفلي, also Romanized as Jeyrān-e Soflá) is a village in Sarajuy-ye Sharqi Rural District, Saraju District, Maragheh County, East Azerbaijan Province, Iran. At the 2006 census, its population was 128, in 21 families.
