= Mavaluy-e Sofla =

Mavaluy-e Sofla مولوي سفلي
- Village
- Location within Iran
- Coordinates: 37°16′00″N 46°32′00″E
- Country: Iran
- Province: East Azerbaijan
- County: Maragheh
- Bakhsh: Saraju
- Rural District: Sarajuy-ye Sharqi

Population (2006)
  - Total: 21
- Time zone: UTC+3:30 (IRST)
  - Summer (DST): UTC+4:30 (IRDT)

Mavaluy-e Sofla (Persian: مولوي سفلي, also Romanized as Mavālūy-e Soflá'; also known as Mavālū-ye Soflá) is a village in Sarajuy-ye Sharqi Rural District, Saraju District, Maragheh County, East Azerbaijan Province, Iran. At the 2006 census, its population was 21, in 4 families.
