= Owkhchi =

Village in East Azerbaijan province, Iran

Owkhchi Persian: اوخچي
- Village
- Location within Iran
- Coordinates: 37°13′13″N 46°27′02″E
- Country: Iran
- Province: East Azerbaijan
- County: Maragheh
- District: Saraju
- Rural District: Sarajuy-ye Jonubi

Population (2016)
  - Total: 206
- Time zone: UTC+3:30 (IRST)

Owkhchi (Persian: اوخچي) (Note: Also romanized as Owkhchī and Ūkhchī) is a village in Sarajuy-ye Jonubi Rural District of Saraju District in Maragheh County, East Azerbaijan province, Iran.

== Demographics ==
=== Population ===
At the time of the 2006 National Census, the village's population was 290 in 60 households. The following census in 2011 counted 244 people in 65 households. The 2016 census measured the population of the village as 206 people in 70 households.
