= Hajji Kandi, East Azerbaijan =

Hajji Kandi حاجي كندي
- Village

- Location within Iran
- Coordinates: 37°14′47″N 46°24′57″E
- Country: Iran
- Province: East Azerbaijan
- County: Maragheh
- Bakhsh: Saraju
- Rural District: Sarajuy-ye Jonubi

Population (2006)
  - Total: 145
- Time zone: UTC+3:30 (IRST)
  - Summer (DST): UTC+4:30 (IRDT)

Hajji Kandi (Persian: حاجي كندي, also Romanized as Ḩājjī Kandī) is a village in Sarajuy-ye Jonubi Rural District, Saraju District, Maragheh County, East Azerbaijan Province, Iran. At the 2006 census, its population was 145, in 27 families.

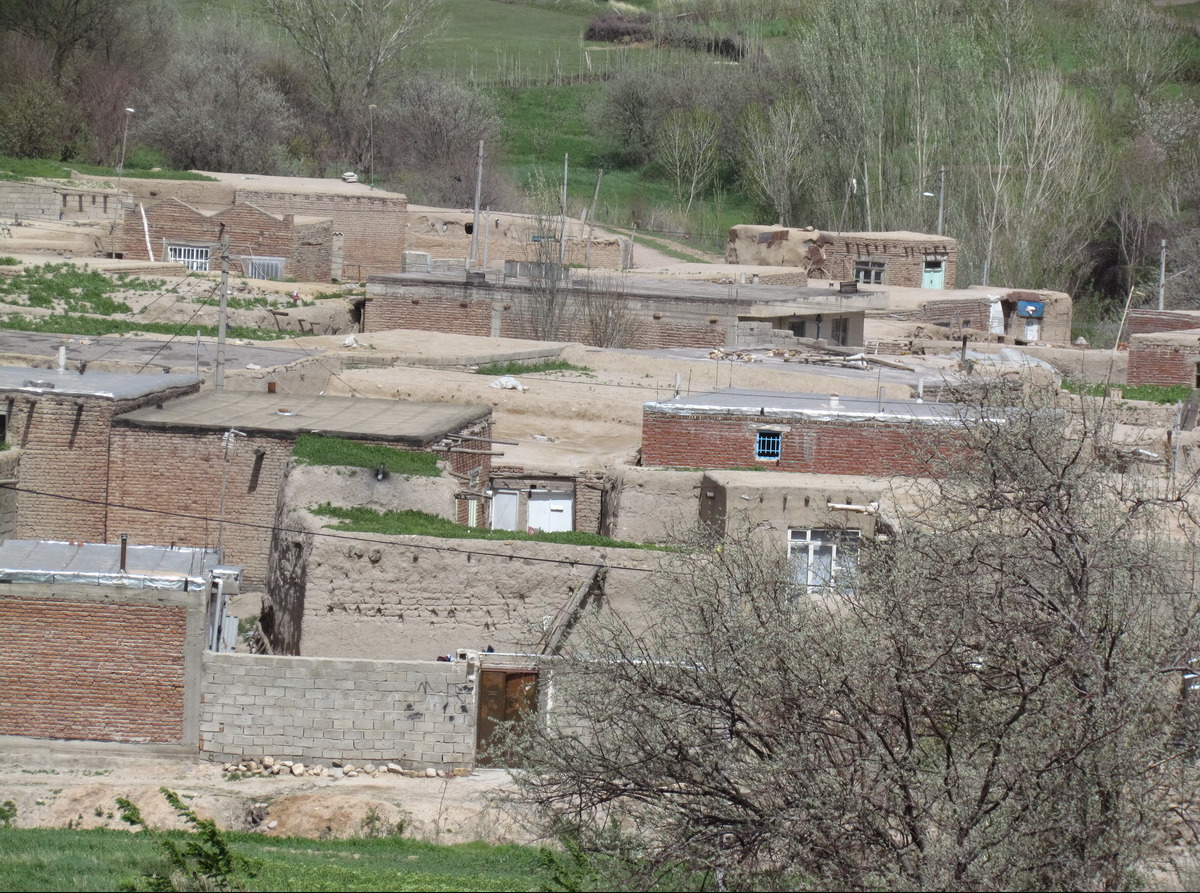
Houses in the village
