= Palchoqlu, Maragheh =

Palchoqlu پالچقلو
- Village
- Location within Iran
- Coordinates: 37°19′25″N 46°35′31″E
- Country: Iran
- Province: East Azerbaijan
- County: Maragheh
- Bakhsh: Saraju
- Rural District: Sarajuy-ye Sharqi

Population (2006)
  - Total: 664
- Time zone: UTC+3:30 (IRST)
  - Summer (DST): UTC+4:30 (IRDT)

Palchoqlu (Persian: پالچقلو, also Romanized as Pālchoqlū) is a village in Sarajuy-ye Sharqi Rural District, Saraju District, Maragheh County, East Azerbaijan Province, Iran. At the 2006 census, its population was 664, in 121 families.
