= Qater Guturan =

Qater Guturan (Persian: قاطرگوتورن), also rendered as Qater Gutran, may refer to:

- Qater Guturan-e Olya
- Qater Guturan-e Sofla
