= Mavaluy-e Olya =

Mavaluy-e Olya مولوي عليا
- Village
- Location within Iran
- Coordinates: 37°15′33″N 46°32′37″E
- Country: Iran
- Province: East Azerbaijan
- County: Maragheh
- Bakhsh: Saraju
- Rural District: Sarajuy-ye Sharqi

Population (2006)
  - Total: 95
- Time zone: UTC+3:30 (IRST)
  - Summer (DST): UTC+4:30 (IRDT)

Mavaluy-e Olya (Persian: مولوي عليا, also Romanized as Mavālūy-e ‘Olyā; also known as Mavālū and Mavālū-ye ‘Olyā) is a village in Sarajuy-ye Sharqi Rural District, Saraju District, Maragheh County, East Azerbaijan Province, Iran. At the 2006 census, its population was 95, in 18 families.
