= Yunjalu, East Azerbaijan =

Yunjalu يونجالو
- Village
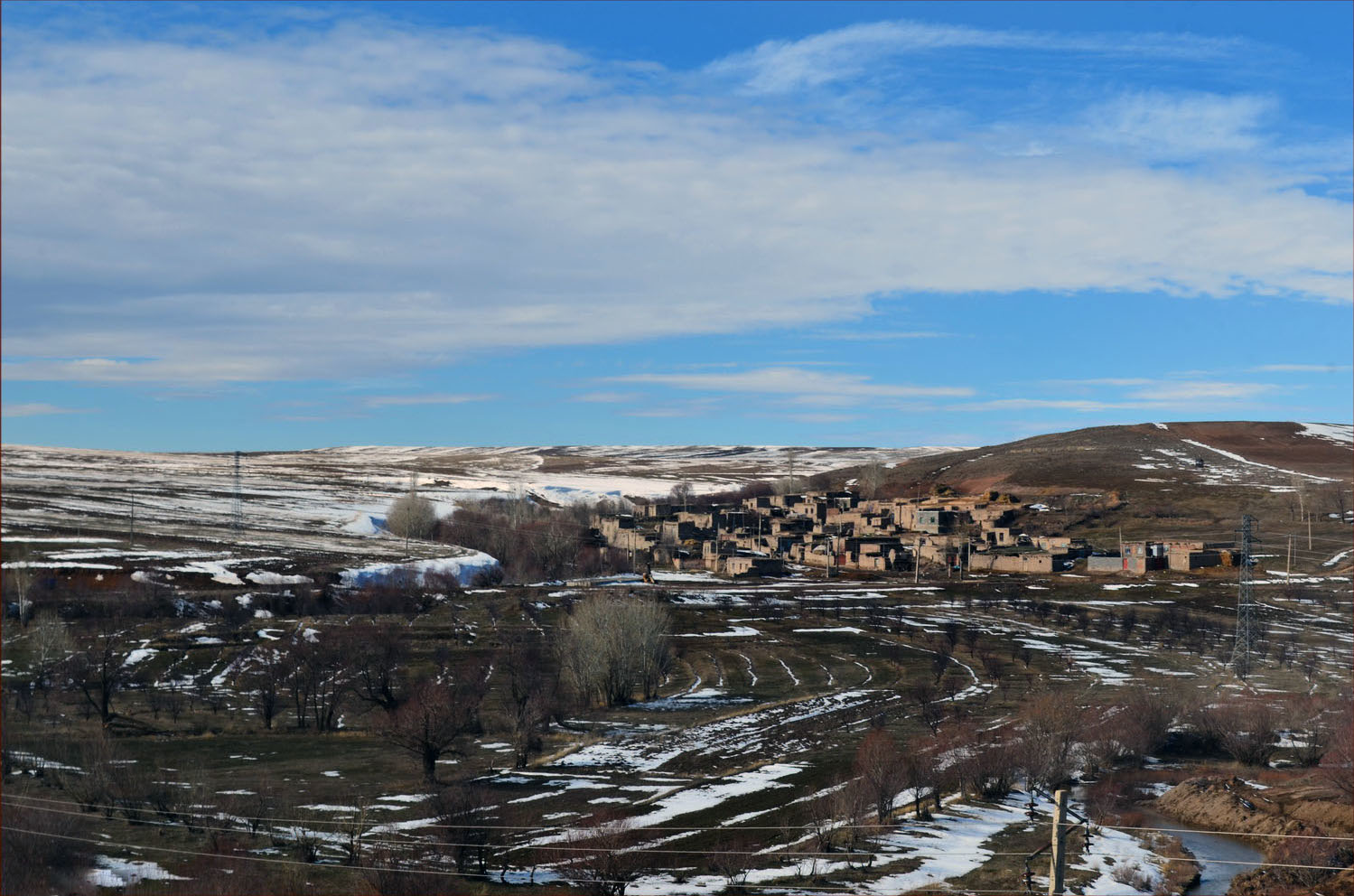
- Yunjalu in winter Yunjalu in spring

- Location within Iran
- Coordinates: 37°18′32″N 46°39′22″E
- Country: Iran
- Province: East Azerbaijan
- County: Maragheh
- Bakhsh: Saraju
- Rural District: Sarajuy-ye Sharqi

Population (2006)
  - Total: 66
- Time zone: UTC+3:30 (IRST)
  - Summer (DST): UTC+4:30 (IRDT)

Yunjalu (Persian: يونجالو, also Romanized as Yūnjālū; also known as Yonjahlū) is a village in Sarajuy-ye Sharqi Rural District, Saraju District, Maragheh County, East Azerbaijan Province, Iran. At the 2006 census, its population was 66, in 10 families.
