= Chonaq Bolagh =

Chonaq Bolagh (Persian: چناقبلاغ) may refer to:

- Chonaq Bolagh-e Olya
- Chonaq Bolagh-e Sofla
