= Aghcheh Kohel, Maragheh =

Village in East Azerbaijan province, Iran

Aghcheh Kohel Persian: آغچه كهل
- Village
- Location within Iran
- Coordinates: 37°16′01″N 46°26′45″E
- Country: Iran
- Province: East Azerbaijan
- County: Maragheh
- District: Saraju
- Rural District: Sarajuy-ye Jonubi

Population (2016)
  - Total: 761
- Time zone: UTC+3:30 (IRST)

Aghcheh Kohel (Persian: آغچه كهل) (Note: Also romanized as Āghcheh Kohel) is a village in, and the capital of, Sarajuy-ye Jonubi Rural District in Saraju District of Maragheh County, East Azerbaijan province, Iran. The previous capital of the rural district was the village of Gol Tappeh.

== Demographics ==
=== Population ===
At the time of the 2006 National Census, the village's population was 608 in 107 households. The following census in 2011 counted 764 people in 196 households. The 2016 census measured the population of the village as 761 people in 228 households. It was the most populous village in its rural district.
