= Guyjeh Qaleh-ye Sofla =

Village in East Azerbaijan, Iran

Guyjeh Qaleh-ye Sofla گويجه قلعه سفلي
- Village
- Location within Iran
- Coordinates: 37°12′58″N 46°32′09″E
- Country: Iran
- Province: East Azerbaijan
- County: Maragheh
- Bakhsh: Saraju
- Rural District: Quri Chay-ye Gharbi

Population (2006)
  - Total: 62
- Time zone: UTC+3:30 (IRST)
  - Summer (DST): UTC+4:30 (IRDT)

Guyjeh Qaleh-ye Sofla (Persian: گويجه قلعه سفلي, also Romanized as Gūyjeh Qal‘eh-ye Soflá; also known as Gowjeh Qal‘eh-ye Soflá and) is a village in Quri Chay-ye Gharbi Rural District, Saraju District, Maragheh County, East Azerbaijan Province, Iran. At the 2006 census, its population was 62, in 13 families.
