= Qavaqlu =

Qavaqlu (Persian: قواقلو) may refer to:

- Qavaqlu, East Azerbaijan
- Qavaqlu, West Azerbaijan
