= Owzun Owbeh, East Azerbaijan =

Owzun Owbeh اوزون اوبه
- Village
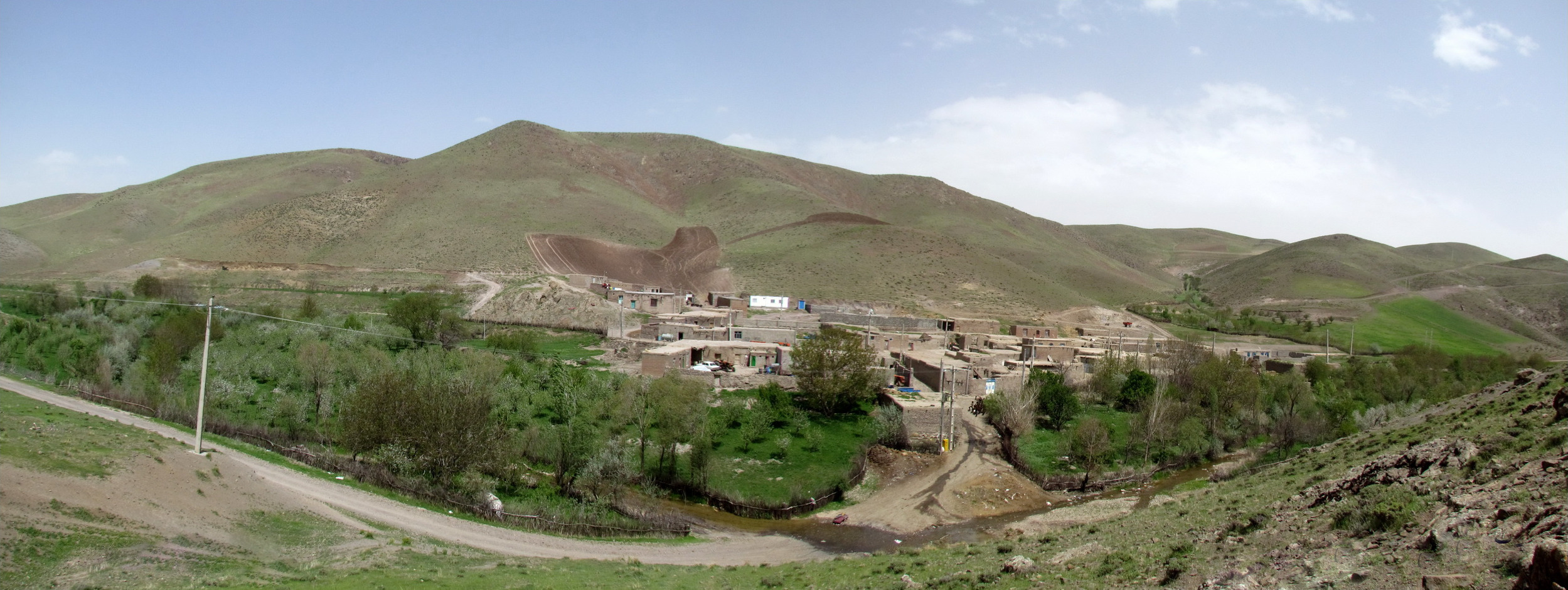

- Location within Iran
- Coordinates: 37°11′23″N 46°25′00″E
- Country: Iran
- Province: East Azerbaijan
- County: Maragheh
- Bakhsh: Saraju
- Rural District: Sarajuy-ye Jonubi

Population (2006)
  - Total: 78
- Time zone: UTC+3:30 (IRST)
  - Summer (DST): UTC+4:30 (IRDT)

Owzun Owbeh (Persian: اوزون اوبه, also Romanized as Owzūn Owbeh and Ūzūn Owbeh; also known as Owzūn Owyeh and Ūzūn Qowbeh) is a village in Sarajuy-ye Jonubi Rural District, Saraju District, Maragheh County, East Azerbaijan Province, Iran. At the 2006 census, its population was 78, in 23 families.

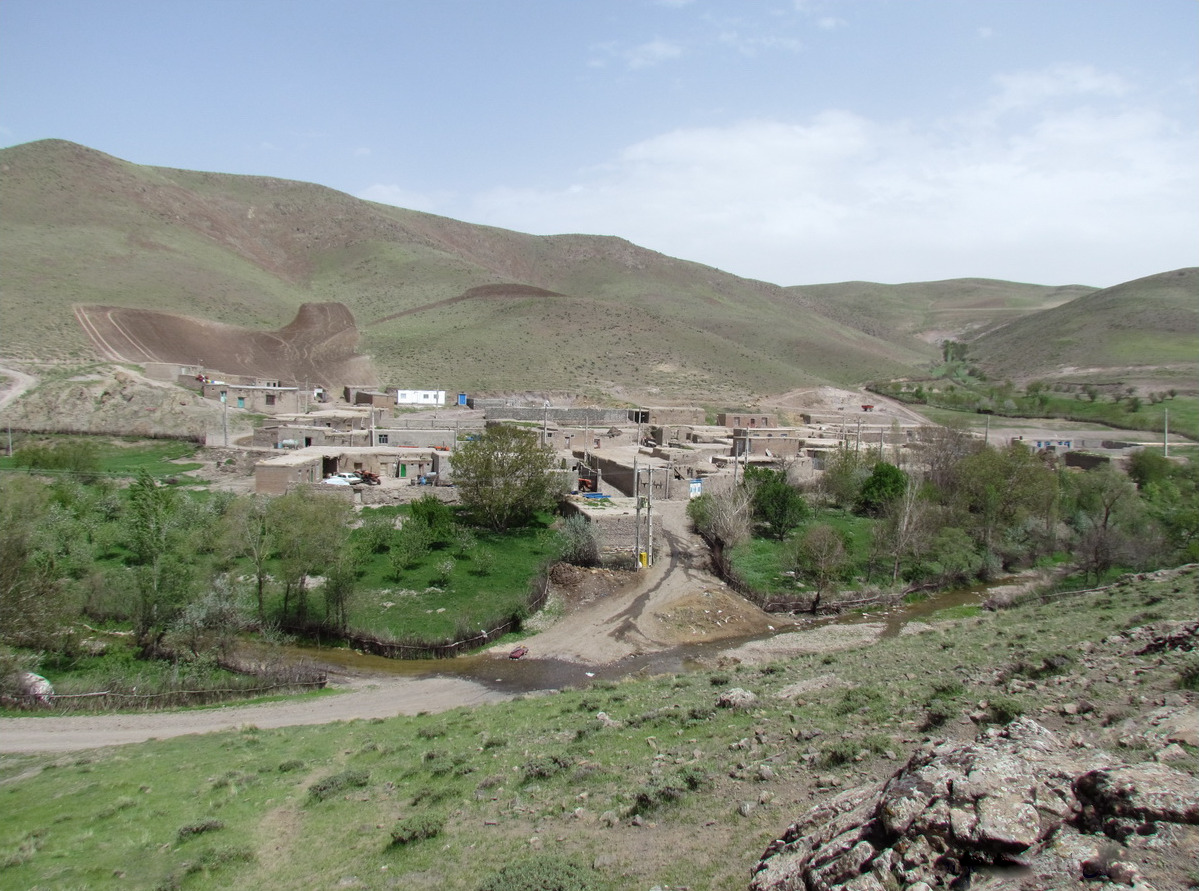
Close view on the village
