= Guyjeh Qamalaq, Maragheh =

Village in East Azerbaijan province, Iran

Guyjeh Qamalaq Persian: گويجه قملاق
- Village
- Location within Iran
- Coordinates: 37°10′36″N 46°29′02″E
- Country: Iran
- Province: East Azerbaijan
- County: Maragheh
- District: Saraju
- Rural District: Quri Chay-ye Gharbi

Population (2016)
  - Total: 194
- Time zone: UTC+3:30 (IRST)

Guyjeh Qamalaq (Persian: گويجه قملاق) (Note: Also romanized as Gūyjeh Qamalāq; also known as Gowjeh Qamalāq and Gūyjeh Qamlān) is a village in Quri Chay-ye Gharbi Rural District of Saraju District in Maragheh County, East Azerbaijan province, Iran.

== Demographics ==
=== Population ===
At the time of the 2006 National Census, the village's population was 256 in 51 households. The following census in 2011 counted 222 people in 60 households. The 2016 census measured the population of the village as 194 people in 74 households.
