= Chelan-e Olya =

Village in East Azerbaijan province, Iran

Chelan-e Olya Persian: چلان عليا
- Village
- Location within Iran
- Coordinates: 37°23′15″N 46°33′02″E
- Country: Iran
- Province: East Azerbaijan
- County: Maragheh
- District: Saraju
- Rural District: Sarajuy-ye Sharqi

Population (2016)
  - Total: 688
- Time zone: UTC+3:30 (IRST)

Chelan-e Olya (Persian: چلان عليا) (Note: Also romanized as Chelān-e 'Olyā; also known as Chelān) is a village in Sarajuy-ye Sharqi Rural District of Saraju District in Maragheh County, East Azerbaijan province, Iran.

== Demographics ==
=== Population ===
At the time of the 2006 National Census, the village's population was 619 in 121 households. The following census in 2011 counted 688 people in 181 households. The 2016 census measured the population of the village as 688 people in 193 households.
