= Chugi =

Chugi may refer to:

- Chūgi, a Japanese anal cleaning tool
- Chugi, Iran (disambiguation), places in Iran
