= Golestan-e Olya =

Village in East Azerbaijan province, Iran

Golestan-e Olya Persian: گلستان عليا
- Village
- Location within Iran
- Coordinates: 37°21′09″N 46°31′03″E
- Country: Iran
- Province: East Azerbaijan
- County: Maragheh
- District: Saraju
- Rural District: Sarajuy-ye Sharqi

Population (2016)
  - Total: 770
- Time zone: UTC+3:30 (IRST)

Golestan-e Olya (Persian: گلستان عليا) (Note: Also romanized as Golestān-e ‘Olyā; also known as Qāţer Gūtran-e ‘Olyā and Qāţer Gūtūran-e ‘Olyā (قاطرگوتورن عليا)) is a village in Sarajuy-ye Sharqi Rural District of Saraju District in Maragheh County, East Azerbaijan province, Iran.

== Demographics ==
=== Population ===
At the time of the 2006 National Census, the village's population was 694 in 148 households. The following census in 2011 counted 763 people in 202 households. The 2016 census measured the population of the village as 770 people in 219 households.
