= Gowyjeh Qomlaq =

Gowyjeh Qomlaq or Guyjeh Qamalaq (Persian: گويجه قملاق), also rendered as Gowjeh Qamalaq, may refer to:

- Gowyjeh Qomlaq, Hashtrud
- Guyjeh Qamalaq, Maragheh
