= Sowmaeh-ye Sofla, Maragheh =

Village in East Azerbaijan province, Iran

Sowmaeh-ye Sofla Persian: صومعه سفلي
- Village
- Location within Iran
- Coordinates: 37°19′21″N 46°34′10″E
- Country: Iran
- Province: East Azerbaijan
- County: Maragheh
- District: Saraju
- Rural District: Sarajuy-ye Sharqi

Population (2016)
  - Total: 1,464
- Time zone: UTC+3:30 (IRST)

Sowmaeh-ye Sofla (Persian: صومعه سفلي) (Note: Also romanized as Şowma‘eh-ye Soflá) is a village in Sarajuy-ye Sharqi Rural District of Saraju District in Maragheh County, East Azerbaijan province, Iran.

== Demographics ==
=== Population ===
At the time of the 2006 National Census, the village's population was 1,713 in 296 households. The following census in 2011 counted 1,509 people in 382 households. The 2016 census measured the population of the village as 1,464 people in 454 households.
