= Chelan =

Chelan may refer to:

== Places ==
=== Washington State, United States ===
- Chelan County, Washington
  - Chelan, Washington, a city
- Chelan River
- Lake Chelan
- Chelan Mountains

=== Iran ===
- Chelan-e Olya, a village in East Azerbaijan Province
- Chelan-e Sofla, a village in East Azerbaijan Province
- Chelan, Lorestan, a village in Lorestan Province

=== Elsewhere ===
- Chelan, Saskatchewan, Canada, a hamlet
- Chelan Seamount, a seamount in the Pacific Ocean off Vancouver Island, British Columbia, Canada
- Chélan, France, a commune

== People ==
- Chelan people, a Native American tribe associated historically with the Lake Chelan region
- Chelan Simmons (born 1982), Canadian actress and former model

== Ships ==
- MV Chelan, a passenger ferry in Washington State
- USCGC Chelan, a United States Coast Guard cutter

== Other uses ==
- Chelan High School, Chelan, Washington State
- Chelan cherry, a hybrid cherry developed in Washington State

== See also ==
- Chillán, a city in Chile
