= Sheykhlar-e Sofla =

Sheykhlar-e Sofla (Persian: شيخ لرسفلي) may refer to:

- Sheykhlar-e Sofla, East Azerbaijan
- Sheykhlar-e Sofla, Golestan
