= Alilu =

Alilu may refer to:

- Alilu, Armenia
- Alilu, Iran
