= Lakeside, Washington =

Unincorporated community in Washington, US

Coordinates: 47°50′7″N 120°3′1″W

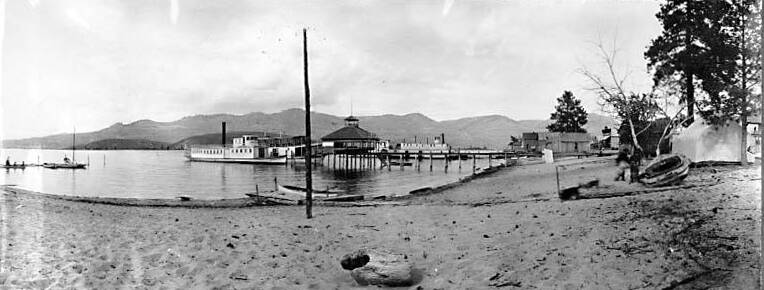
Pier at Lakeside, probably between 1888 and 1912.

Lakeside is an unincorporated community and census-designated place in Chelan County, Washington, United States. It is part of Wenatchee–East Wenatchee Metropolitan Statistical Area. The community is a neighborhood of the incorporated city of Chelan.
