= Sowmaeh-ye Olya, Maragheh =

Village in East Azerbaijan province, Iran

Sowmaeh-ye Olya Persian: صومعه عليا
- Village
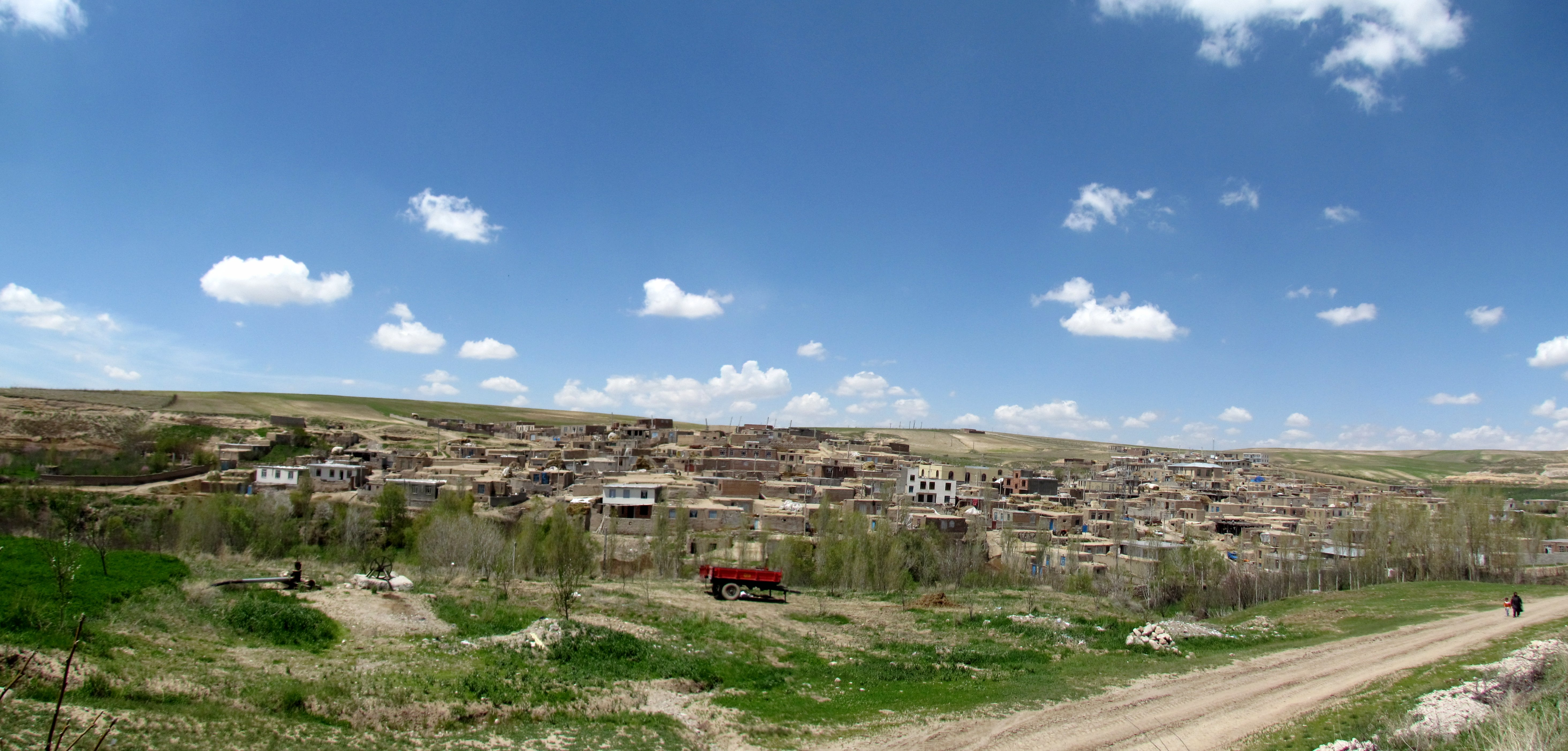
- The village of Sowmaeh-ye Olya

- Location within Iran
- Coordinates: 37°21′53″N 46°34′46″E
- Country: Iran
- Province: East Azerbaijan
- County: Maragheh
- District: Saraju
- Rural District: Sarajuy-ye Sharqi

Population (2016)
  - Total: 700
- Time zone: UTC+3:30 (IRST)

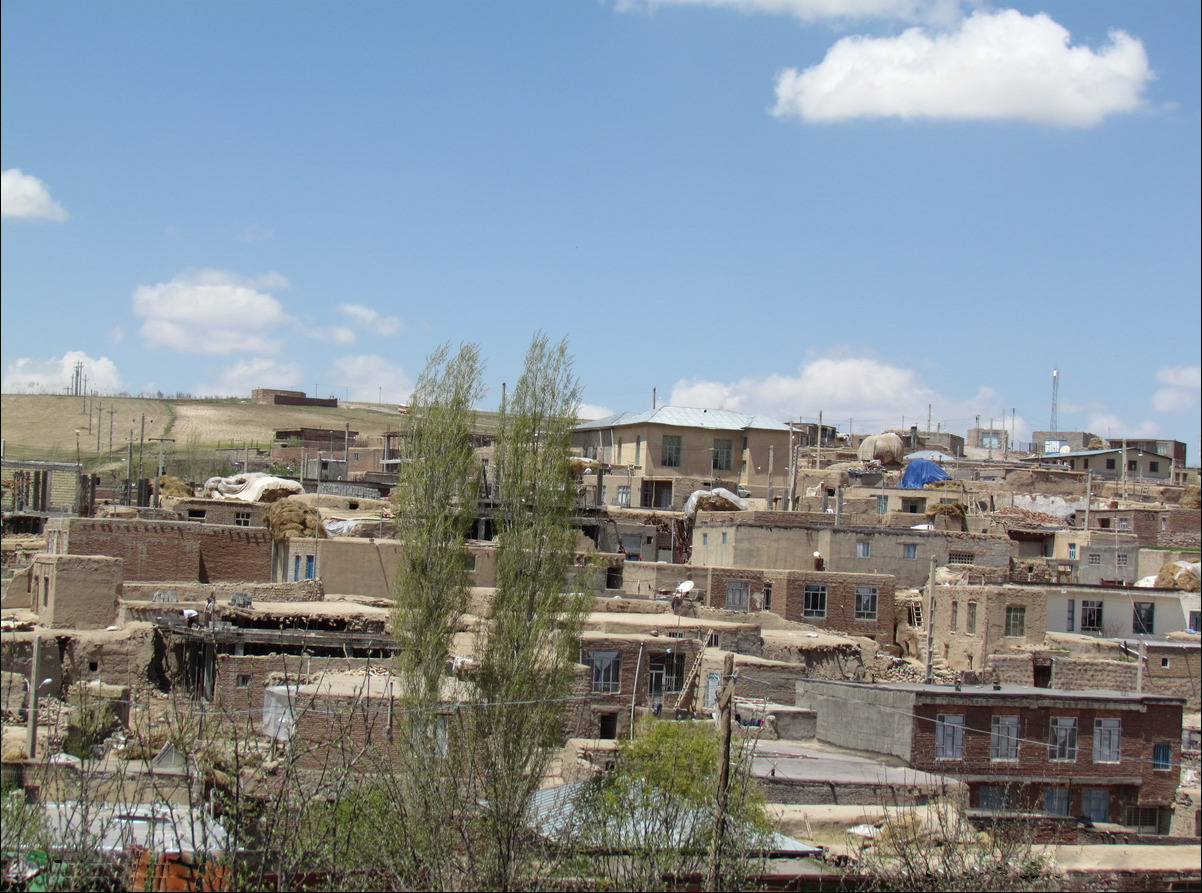
Houses in the village of Sowmaeh-ye Olya

Sowmaeh-ye Olya (Persian: صومعه عليا) (Note: Also romanized as Şowma‘eh-ye ‘Olyā) is a village in Sarajuy-ye Sharqi Rural District of Saraju District in Maragheh County, East Azerbaijan province, Iran.

== Demographics ==
=== Population ===
At the time of the 2006 National Census, the village's population was 808 in 133 households. The following census in 2011 counted 726 people in 165 households. The 2016 census measured the population of the village as 700 people in 160 households.
