= Golestan-e Sofla =

Village in East Azerbaijan province, Iran

Golestan-e Sofla Persian: گلستان سفلي
- Village
- Location within Iran
- Coordinates: 37°20′13″N 46°30′27″E
- Country: Iran
- Province: East Azerbaijan
- County: Maragheh
- District: Saraju
- Rural District: Sarajuy-ye Sharqi

Population (2016)
  - Total: 724
- Time zone: UTC+3:30 (IRST)

Golestan-e Sofla (Persian: گلستان سفلي) (Note: Also romanized as Golestān-e Soflá; also known as Qāţer Gūtran-e Soflá and Qāţer Gūtūran-e Soflá (قاطرگوتورن سفل)) is a village in Sarajuy-ye Sharqi Rural District of Saraju District in Maragheh County, East Azerbaijan province, Iran.

== Demographics ==
=== Population ===
At the time of the 2006 National Census, the village's population was 730 in 163 households. The following census in 2011 counted 608 people in 160 households. The 2016 census measured the population of the village as 724 people in 225 households.
