= Sowmaeh-ye Sofla =

Sowmaeh-ye Sofla (Persian: صومعه سفلي) may refer to:

- Sowmaeh-ye Sofla, Maragheh
- Sowmaeh-ye Sofla, Meyaneh
