= Owzun Owbeh =

Owzun Owbeh or Uzun Owbeh (Persian: اوزون اوبه) may refer to:

- Owzun Owbeh, East Azerbaijan
- Uzun Owbeh, West Azerbaijan
