= Ozbak =

Ozbak (Persian: ازبك) may refer to:

- Ozbak, East Azerbaijan
- Ozbak, Kaleybar, East Azerbaijan Province
- Ozbak, South Khorasan
