= Guyjeh Qaleh =

Guyjeh Qaleh (Persian: گويجه قلعه) may refer to:

- Guyjeh Qaleh-ye Olya
- Guyjeh Qaleh-ye Sofla

== See also ==
- Gowjeh Qaleh (disambiguation)
