= Aghbolagh-e Olya =

Aghbolagh-e Olya (Persian: اغبلاغ عليا), also rendered as Aqbolagh-e Olya, may refer to:

- Aghbolagh-e Olya, East Azerbaijan
- Aghbolagh-e Olya, West Azerbaijan
