= Qarah Kand, Maragheh =

Village in East Azerbaijan province, Iran

Qarah Kand Persian: قره كند
- Village
- Location within Iran
- Coordinates: 37°11′20″N 46°23′02″E
- Country: Iran
- Province: East Azerbaijan
- County: Maragheh
- District: Saraju
- Rural District: Sarajuy-ye Jonubi

Population (2016)
  - Total: 309
- Time zone: UTC+3:30 (IRST)

Qarah Kand (Persian: قره كند) (Note: Also known as Qarah Kand-e Şedqī, Qareh Kand-e Şedqī, and Qareh Kand-e Şedqīzī) is a village in Sarajuy-ye Jonubi Rural District of Saraju District in Maragheh County, East Azerbaijan province, Iran.

== Demographics ==
=== Population ===
At the time of the 2006 National Census, the village's population was 257 in 56 households. The following census in 2011 counted 295 people in 72 households. The 2016 census measured the population of the village as 309 people in 96 households.
