= Yunjalu =

Yunjalu (Persian: يونجالو) may refer to:

- Yunjalu, Ardabil
- Yunjalu, East Azerbaijan
