= Jeyran Bolaghi =

Jeyran Bolaghi (Persian: جيرانبلاغي or جيران بلاغي) may refer to:

- Jeyran Bolaghi, East Azerbaijan

== See also ==
- Jeyran Bolagh
