= Aghbolagh-e Olya, East Azerbaijan =

Village in East Azerbaijan province, Iran

Aghbolagh-e Olya Persian: اغبلاغ عليا
- Village
- Location within Iran
- Coordinates: 37°10′42″N 46°32′35″E
- Country: Iran
- Province: East Azerbaijan
- County: Maragheh
- District: Saraju
- Rural District: Quri Chay-ye Gharbi

Population (2016)
  - Total: 213
- Time zone: UTC+3:30 (IRST)

Aghbolagh-e Olya (Persian: اغبلاغ عليا) (Note: Also romanized as Āghbolāgh-e ‘Olyā; also known as Āqbolāgh-e ‘Olyā) is a village in Quri Chay-ye Gharbi Rural District of Saraju District in Maragheh County, East Azerbaijan province, Iran.

== Demographics ==
=== Population ===
At the time of the 2006 National Census, the village's population was 266 in 40 households. The following census in 2011 counted 256 people in 72 households. The 2016 census measured the population of the village as 213 people in 58 households.
