= Jeyran-e Sofla =

Jeyran-e Sofla (Persian: جيران سفلي) may refer to:

- Jeyran-e Sofla, East Azerbaijan
- Jeyran-e Sofla, West Azerbaijan
