= Juki, Iran =

Juki (Persian: جوكي), also rendered as Chugi and Jugi, may refer to:

- Juki-ye Bizhan
- Juki-ye Vosta
