= Sowmaeh-ye Olya =

Sowmaeh-ye Olya or Sowmeeh-ye Olya (Persian: صومعه عليا) may refer to:

- Sowmaeh-ye Olya, Maragheh
- Sowmaeh-ye Olya, Meyaneh
