= Jeyran-e Olya =

Jeyran-e Olya (Persian: جيران عليا) may refer to:

- Jeyran-e Olya, East Azerbaijan
- Jeyran-e Olya, West Azerbaijan
