= Qareh Kohneh-ye Musavi =

Qareh Kohneh-ye Musavi قره كنه موسوي
- Village
- Location within Iran
- Coordinates: 37°25′52″N 46°18′09″E
- Country: Iran
- Province: East Azerbaijan
- County: Maragheh
- Bakhsh: Central
- Rural District: Sarajuy-ye Gharbi

Population (2006)
  - Total: 37
- Time zone: UTC+3:30 (IRST)
  - Summer (DST): UTC+4:30 (IRDT)

Qareh Kohneh-ye Musavi (Persian: قره كنه موسوي, romanized: Qareh Kohneh-ye Mūsavī; also known as Qarkand-e Khoṭb, Qarah Kand, Qarah Kand-e Mūsá, and Qareh Kand-e Mūsavī) is a village in Sarajuy-ye Gharbi Rural District, in the Central District of Maragheh County, East Azerbaijan Province, Iran. At the 2006 census, its population was 37, in 9 families.
