= Gowjeh Qaleh =

Gowjeh Qaleh (Persian: گوجه قلعه) may refer to:

- Gowjeh Qaleh, Charuymaq
- Guyjeh Qaleh (disambiguation)
