= Khodaju =

City in East Azerbaijan province, Iran

Khodaju Persian: خداجو
- City
- Location within Iran
- Coordinates: 37°18′39″N 46°31′49″E
- Country: Iran
- Province: East Azerbaijan
- County: Maragheh
- District: Saraju
- Established as a city: 1998
- Elevation: 1,490 m (4,890 ft)

Population (2016)
  - Total: 1,824
- Time zone: UTC+3:30 (IRST)
- Area code: 041

Khodaju (Persian: خداجو) (Note: Also romanized as Khodajū; formerly known as Kharaju (خراجو) (Azerbaijani: خراجو)) is a city in, and the capital of, Saraju District in Maragheh County, East Azerbaijan province, Iran. It also serves as the administrative center for Sarajuy-ye Sharqi Rural District. The village of Kharaju was converted to a city in 1998.

== Demographics ==
=== Population ===
At the time of the 2006 National Census, the city's population was 1,458 in 361 households. The following census in 2011 counted 1,584 people in 430 households. The 2016 census measured the population of the city as 1,824 people in 572 households.
