= Molla Qasem, Bostanabad =

Molla Qasem ملاقاسم
- Village
- Location within Iran
- Coordinates: 37°35′49″N 46°45′31″E
- Country: Iran
- Province: East Azerbaijan
- County: Bostanabad
- Bakhsh: Tekmeh Dash
- Rural District: Sahandabad

Population (2006)
  - Total: 70
- Time zone: UTC+3:30 (IRST)
  - Summer (DST): UTC+4:30 (IRDT)

Molla Qasem (Persian: ملاقاسم, also Romanized as Mollā Qāsem) is a village in Sahandabad Rural District, Tekmeh Dash District, Bostanabad County, East Azerbaijan Province, Iran. At the 2006 census, its population was 70, in 21 families.
