= Jeyran Darreh =

Jeyran Darreh جيران دره
- Village
- Location within Iran
- Coordinates: 37°32′33″N 46°46′25″E
- Country: Iran
- Province: East Azerbaijan
- County: Hashtrud
- Bakhsh: Central
- Rural District: Soluk

Population (2006)
  - Total: 85
- Time zone: UTC+3:30 (IRST)
  - Summer (DST): UTC+4:30 (IRDT)

Jeyran Darreh (Persian: جيران دره, also Romanized as Jeyrān Darreh; also known as Jeyrān Daraq) is a village in Soluk Rural District, in the Central District of Hashtrud County, East Azerbaijan Province, Iran. At the 2006 census, its population was 85, in 16 families.
