= Hajji Kandi-ye Olya =

Hajji Kandi-ye Olya حاجي كندي عليا
- Village
- Location within Iran
- Coordinates: 37°03′28″N 47°02′53″E
- Country: Iran
- Province: East Azerbaijan
- County: Charuymaq
- Bakhsh: Central
- Rural District: Charuymaq-e Jonubegharbi

Population (2006)
  - Total: 121
- Time zone: UTC+3:30 (IRST)
  - Summer (DST): UTC+4:30 (IRDT)

Hajji Kandi-ye Olya (Persian: حاجي كندي عليا, also Romanized as Ḩājjī Kandī-ye ‘Olyā) is a village in Charuymaq-e Jonubegharbi Rural District, in the Central District of Charuymaq County, East Azerbaijan Province, Iran. At the 2006 census, its population was 121, in 23 families.
