= Hajji Kandi-ye Sofla =

Hajji Kandi-ye Sofla حاجي كندي سفلي
- Village
- Location within Iran
- Coordinates: 37°03′17″N 47°03′13″E
- Country: Iran
- Province: East Azerbaijan
- County: Charuymaq
- Bakhsh: Central
- Rural District: Charuymaq-e Jonubegharbi

Population (2006)
  - Total: 39
- Time zone: UTC+3:30 (IRST)
  - Summer (DST): UTC+4:30 (IRDT)

Hajji Kandi-ye Sofla (Persian: حاجي كندي سفلي, also Romanized as Ḩājjī Kandī-ye Soflá) is a village in Charuymaq-e Jonubegharbi Rural District, in the Central District of Charuymaq County, East Azerbaijan Province, Iran. At the 2006 census, its population was 39, in 7 families.
