= Jeyran =

Jeyran جيران
- Village
- Location within Iran
- Coordinates: 36°10′11″N 47°51′10″E
- Country: Iran
- Province: Kurdistan
- County: Bijar
- Bakhsh: Korani
- Rural District: Gorgin

Population (2006)
  - Total: 115
- Time zone: UTC+3:30 (IRST)
  - Summer (DST): UTC+4:30 (IRDT)

Jeyran (Persian: جيران, also Romanized as Jeyrān) is a village in Gorgin Rural District, Korani District, Bijar County, Kurdistan province, Iran. At the 2006 census, its population was 115, in 25 families. The village is populated by Azerbaijanis.
