= Hajji Kand =

Hajji Kand حاجي كند
- Village
- Location within Iran
- Coordinates: 36°36′23″N 45°59′37″E
- Country: Iran
- Province: West Azerbaijan
- County: Bukan
- Bakhsh: Central
- Rural District: Akhtachi

Population (2006)
  - Total: 213
- Time zone: UTC+3:30 (IRST)
  - Summer (DST): UTC+4:30 (IRDT)

Hajji Kand (Persian: حاجي كند, also Romanized as Ḩājjī Kand; also known as Ḩājjī Kandī) is a village in Akhtachi Rural District, in the Central District of Bukan County, West Azerbaijan Province, Iran. At the 2006 census, its population was 213, in 38 families.
