= Sadeq Ganji =

Iranian politician (1963–1990)

Martyr Sadegh Ganji
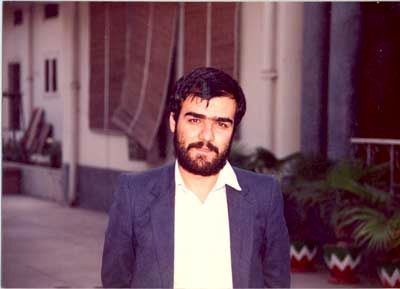
- A sign of merit and competence

Head of the House of Culture of the Islamic Republic of Iran in Lahore, Pakistan

Personal details
- Born: 1963 Fasa
- Died: 28 December 1990 (aged 26–27) Lahore, Pakistan
- Education: Master's Degree Theology
- Alma mater: Shahid Motahari University
- Website: https://sadeqganji.com

Sadeq Ganji (died 1990), also spelled Sadegh Ganji, was the director of the Iranian Cultural Centre in Lahore, Pakistan (Khana-e-Farhang-e-Iran). He was assassinated in December 1990, reportedly becoming the first prominent Iranian figure to be killed in sectarian violence in Pakistan that had affected the country for over two decades.

The assassination was carried out by Sheikh Haq Nawaz Jhangvi, a member of the hardline Sunni militant group Sipah-e-Sahaba Pakistan. Jhangvi was found guilty of Ganji's murder by the anti-terrorism court of Pakistan in 1991 and was sentenced to death. He was executed by hanging in Central Jail Mianwali on 28 February 2001 at around 6:30 a.m. PKT.

== See also ==
- Sectarian violence in Pakistan
- Iran–Pakistan relations
