= Qarajeh Qaya =

Qarajeh Qaya قره جه قيا
- Village
- Location within Iran
- Coordinates: 37°26′52″N 47°28′46″E
- Country: Iran
- Province: East Azerbaijan
- County: Meyaneh
- Bakhsh: Central
- Rural District: Owch Tappeh-ye Sharqi

Population (2006)
  - Total: 112
- Time zone: UTC+3:30 (IRST)
  - Summer (DST): UTC+4:30 (IRDT)

Qarajeh Qaya (Persian: قره جه قيا, also Romanized as Qarājeh Qayā and Qarejeh Qayā; also known as Gharājeh Ghiya, Qarājeh Qayah, Qarājeh Qayeh, Qarehjeh Qīā, and Qarajenkiah) is a village in Owch Tappeh-ye Sharqi Rural District, in the Central District of Meyaneh County, East Azerbaijan Province, Iran. At the 2006 census, its population was 112, in 25 families.
