= Jeyran Bolaghi, East Azerbaijan =

Jeyran Bolaghi جیرانبلاغی
- Village
- Location within Iran
- Coordinates: 37°33′44″N 47°19′31″E
- Country: Iran
- Province: East Azerbaijan
- County: Meyaneh
- Bakhsh: Torkamanchay
- Rural District: Barvanan-e Gharbi

Population (2006)
  - Total: 163
- Time zone: UTC+3:30 (IRST)
  - Summer (DST): UTC+4:30 (IRDT)

Jeyran Bolaghi (Persian: جیرانبلاغی, also Romanized as Jeyrān Bolāghī; also known as Jeiran Bolagh, Jeyrān Bolāgh, Jirānbolāgh, and Jirān Bulāqi) is a village in Barvanan-e Gharbi Rural District, Torkamanchay District, Meyaneh County, East Azerbaijan Province, Iran. At the 2006 census, its population was 163, in 34 families.
