= Qarajeh Qayah, Hashtrud =

Qarajeh Qayah قراجه قيه
- Village
- Location within Iran
- Coordinates: 37°15′30″N 46°51′41″E
- Country: Iran
- Province: East Azerbaijan
- County: Hashtrud
- Bakhsh: Nazarkahrizi
- Rural District: Nazarkahrizi

Population (2006)
  - Total: 100
- Time zone: UTC+3:30 (IRST)
  - Summer (DST): UTC+4:30 (IRDT)

Qarajeh Qayah (Persian: قراجه قيه, romanized: Qarājeh Qayah) is a village in Nazarkahrizi Rural District, Nazarkahrizi District, Hashtrud County, East Azerbaijan Province, Iran. At the 2006 census, its population was 100, in 20 families.
