= Govijeh =

Govijeh گويجه
- Village
- Location within Iran
- Coordinates: 35°00′35″N 47°25′12″E
- Country: Iran
- Province: Kermanshah
- County: Sonqor
- Bakhsh: Kolyai
- Rural District: Agahan

Population (2006)
  - Total: 35
- Time zone: UTC+3:30 (IRST)
  - Summer (DST): UTC+4:30 (IRDT)

Govijeh (Persian: گويجه, also Romanized as Govījeh and Gūyjeh; also known as Gowjeh and Gujja) is a village in Agahan Rural District, Kolyai District, Sonqor County, Kermanshah Province, Iran. At the 2006 census, its population was 35, in 11 families.
