= Jeyran-e Olya, West Azerbaijan =

Jeyran-e Olya جيران عليا
- Village
- Location within Iran
- Coordinates: 37°24′00″N 45°15′00″E
- Country: Iran
- Province: West Azerbaijan
- County: Urmia
- Bakhsh: Central
- Rural District: Torkaman

Population (2006)
  - Total: 175
- Time zone: UTC+3:30 (IRST)
  - Summer (DST): UTC+4:30 (IRDT)

Jeyran-e Olya (Persian: جيران عليا, also Romanized as Jeyrān-e ‘Olyā) is a village in Torkaman Rural District, in the Central District of Urmia County, West Azerbaijan Province, Iran. At the 2006 census, its population was 175, in 51 families.
