= Gowyjeh Qomlaq, Hashtrud =

Gowyjeh Qomlaq گويجه قملاق
- Village
- Location within Iran
- Coordinates: 37°24′37″N 46°55′43″E
- Country: Iran
- Province: East Azerbaijan
- County: Hashtrud
- Bakhsh: Central
- Rural District: Qaranqu

Population (2006)
  - Total: 156
- Time zone: UTC+3:30 (IRST)
  - Summer (DST): UTC+4:30 (IRDT)

Gowyjeh Qomlaq (Persian: گويجه قملاق, also Romanized as Gowjeh Qomlāq; also known as Gojeh Ghomlagh and Gowyjeh Qandāq) is a village in Qaranqu Rural District, in the Central District of Hashtrud County, East Azerbaijan Province, Iran. At the 2006 census, its population was 156, in 29 families.
