= Ozbak, East Azerbaijan =

Ozbak ازبك
- Village
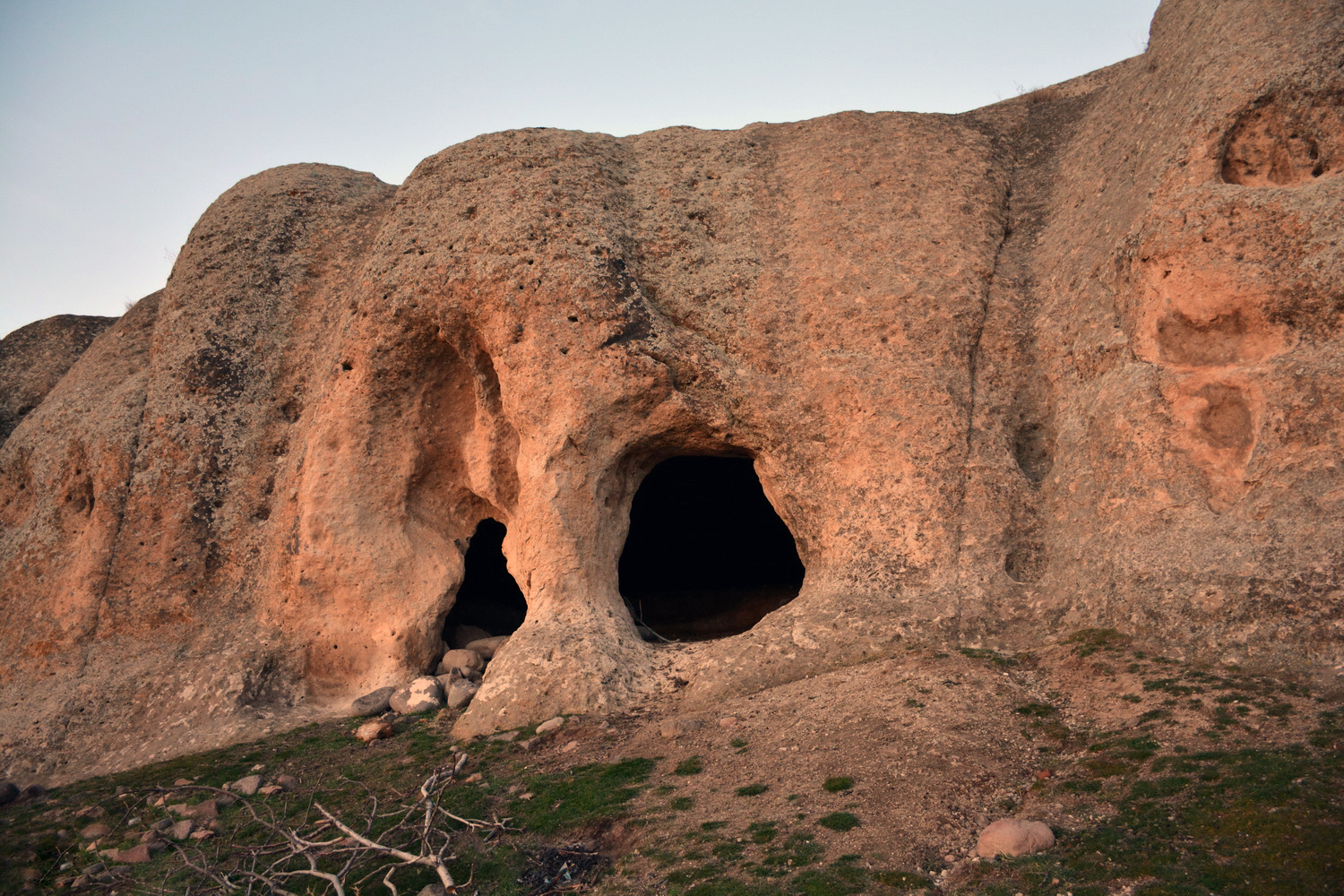
- Ozbak, East Azerbaijan

- Location within Iran
- Coordinates: 37°28′32″N 46°17′53″E
- Country: Iran
- Province: East Azerbaijan
- County: Maragheh
- Bakhsh: Central
- Rural District: Sarajuy-ye Gharbi

Population (2006)
  - Total: 173
- Time zone: UTC+3:30 (IRST)
  - Summer (DST): UTC+4:30 (IRDT)

Ozbak (Persian: ازبك; also known as Ūzbak) is a village in Sarajuy-ye Gharbi Rural District, in the Central District of Maragheh County, East Azerbaijan Province, Iran. At the 2006 census, its population was 173, in 37 families.
