= Jeyran-e Sofla, West Azerbaijan =

Jeyran-e Sofla جيران سفلي
- Village
- Location within Iran
- Coordinates: 37°24′06″N 45°15′37″E
- Country: Iran
- Province: West Azerbaijan
- County: Urmia
- Bakhsh: Central
- Rural District: Torkaman

Population (2006)
  - Total: 58
- Time zone: UTC+3:30 (IRST)
  - Summer (DST): UTC+4:30 (IRDT)

Jeyran-e Sofla (Persian: جيران سفلي, also Romanized as Jeyrān-e Soflá; also known as Jārīḩān-e Pā’īn) is a village in Torkaman Rural District, in the Central District of Urmia County, West Azerbaijan Province, Iran. At the 2006 census, its population was 58, in 15 families.
