= Qavaqlu, West Azerbaijan =

Qavaqlu قواقلو
- Village
- Location within Iran
- Coordinates: 37°00′11″N 46°36′37″E
- Country: Iran
- Province: West Azerbaijan
- County: Miandoab
- Bakhsh: Baruq
- Rural District: Ajorluy-ye Gharbi

Population (2006)
  - Total: 35
- Time zone: UTC+3:30 (IRST)
  - Summer (DST): UTC+4:30 (IRDT)

Qavaqlu (Persian: قواقلو, also Romanized as Qavāqlū) is a village in Ajorluy-ye Gharbi Rural District, Baruq District, Miandoab County, West Azerbaijan Province, Iran. At the 2006 census, its population was 35, in 11 families.
