= Jeyran Bolagh =

Jeyran Bolagh جيرانبلاغ
- Village
- Location within Iran
- Coordinates: 34°10′56″N 47°06′23″E
- Country: Iran
- Province: Kermanshah
- County: Kermanshah
- Bakhsh: Firuzabad
- Rural District: Sar Firuzabad

Population (2006)
  - Total: 186
- Time zone: UTC+3:30 (IRST)
  - Summer (DST): UTC+4:30 (IRDT)

Jeyran Bolagh (Persian: جيرانبلاغ, also Romanized as Jeyrān Bolāgh) is a village in Sar Firuzabad Rural District, Firuzabad District, Kermanshah County, Kermanshah Province, Iran. At the 2006 census, its population was 186, in 44 families.
