= Sarajuy-ye Jonubi Rural District =

Rural district in East Azerbaijan province, Iran

Sarajuy-ye Jonubi Rural District Persian: دهستان سراجوئ جنوبي
- Rural District
- Location within Iran
- Coordinates: 37°13′N 46°25′E
- Country: Iran
- Province: East Azerbaijan
- County: Maragheh
- District: Saraju
- Established: 1987
- Capital: Aghcheh Kohel

Population (2016)
  - Total: 2,957
- Time zone: UTC+3:30 (IRST)

Sarajuy-ye Jonubi Rural District (Persian: دهستان سراجوئ جنوبي) is in Saraju District of Maragheh County, East Azerbaijan province, Iran. Its capital is the village of Aghcheh Kohel. The previous capital of the rural district was the village of Gol Tappeh.

== Demographics ==
=== Population ===
At the time of the 2006 National Census, the rural district's population was 2,961 in 596 households. There were 3,224 inhabitants in 845 households at the following census of 2011. The 2016 census measured the population of the rural district as 2,957 in 1,030 households. The most populous of its 16 villages was Aghcheh Kohel, with 761 people.

=== Other villages in the rural district ===
- Aghbolagh-e Fotuhi
- Aghcheh Dizej
- Owkhchi
- Qarah Kand
- Sari Qayeh
