= Sarajuy-ye Sharqi Rural District =

Rural district in East Azerbaijan province, Iran

Sarajuy-ye Sharqi Rural District Persian: دهستان سراجوئ شرقي
- Rural District
- Location within Iran
- Coordinates: 37°24′N 46°33′E
- Country: Iran
- Province: East Azerbaijan
- County: Maragheh
- District: Saraju
- Established: 1987
- Capital: Khodaju

Population (2016)
  - Total: 13,209
- Time zone: UTC+3:30 (IRST)

Sarajuy-ye Sharqi Rural District (Persian: دهستان سراجوئ شرقي) is in Saraju District of Maragheh County, East Azerbaijan province, Iran. It is administered from the city of Khodaju. (Note: Formerly Kharaju)

== Demographics ==
=== Population ===
At the time of the 2006 National Census, the rural district's population was 13,697 in 2,679 households. There were 12,540 inhabitants in 3,271 households at the following census of 2011. The 2016 census measured the population of the rural district as 13,209 in 3,899 households. The most populous of its 30 villages was Karamjavan, with 2,584 people.

=== Other villages in the rural district ===
- Almachovan
- Bolukabad
- Chelan-e Olya
- Golestan-e Olya
- Golestan-e Sofla
- Sowmaeh-ye Olya
- Sowmaeh-ye Sofla
