= Quri Chay-ye Gharbi Rural District =

Rural district in East Azerbaijan province, Iran

Quri Chay-ye Gharbi Rural District Persian: دهستان قورئ چائ غربي
- Rural District
- Location within Iran
- Coordinates: 37°08′N 46°34′E
- Country: Iran
- Province: East Azerbaijan
- County: Maragheh
- District: Saraju
- Established: 1987
- Capital: Dash Bolagh Bazar

Population (2016)
  - Total: 3,641
- Time zone: UTC+3:30 (IRST)

Quri Chay-ye Gharbi Rural District (Persian: دهستان قورئ چائ غربي) is in Saraju District of Maragheh County, East Azerbaijan province, Iran. Its capital is the village of Dash Bolagh Bazar.

== Demographics ==
=== Population ===
At the time of the 2006 National Census, the rural district's population was 4,382 in 878 households. There were 4,023 inhabitants in 1,082 households at the following census of 2011. The 2016 census measured the population of the rural district as 3,641 in 1,092 households. The most populous of its 54 villages was Dash Bolagh Bazar, with 238 people.

=== Other villages in the rural district ===
- Aghbolagh-e Olya
- Guyjeh Qamalaq
- Khatab-e Sofla
- Sarujeh
