= Saraju District =

District in East Azerbaijan province, Iran

Saraju District Persian: بخش سراجو
- District
- Location within Iran
- Coordinates: 37°18′N 46°31′E
- Country: Iran
- Province: East Azerbaijan
- County: Maragheh
- Established: 1995
- Capital: Khodaju

Population (2016)
  - Total: 21,631
- Time zone: UTC+3:30 (IRST)

Saraju District (Persian: بخش سراجو) is in Maragheh County, East Azerbaijan province, Iran. Its capital is the city of Khodaju. (Note: Formerly Kharaju)

== Demographics ==
=== Population ===
At the time of the 2006 National Census, the district's population was 22,498 in 4,514 households. The following census in 2011 counted 21,371 people in 5,628 households. The 2016 census measured the population of the district as 21,631 inhabitants in 6,593 households.

=== Administrative divisions ===
Saraju District Population
Administrative Divisions	2006	2011	2016
Quri Chay-ye Gharbi RD	4,382	4,023	3,641
Sarajuy-ye Jonubi RD	2,961	3,224	2,957
Sarajuy-ye Sharqi RD	13,697	12,540	13,209
Khodaju (city)	1,458	1,584	1,824
Total	22,498	21,371	21,631
RD = Rural District
