= Maragheh County =

County in East Azerbaijan province, Iran

Maragheh County Persian: شهرستان مراغه
- County
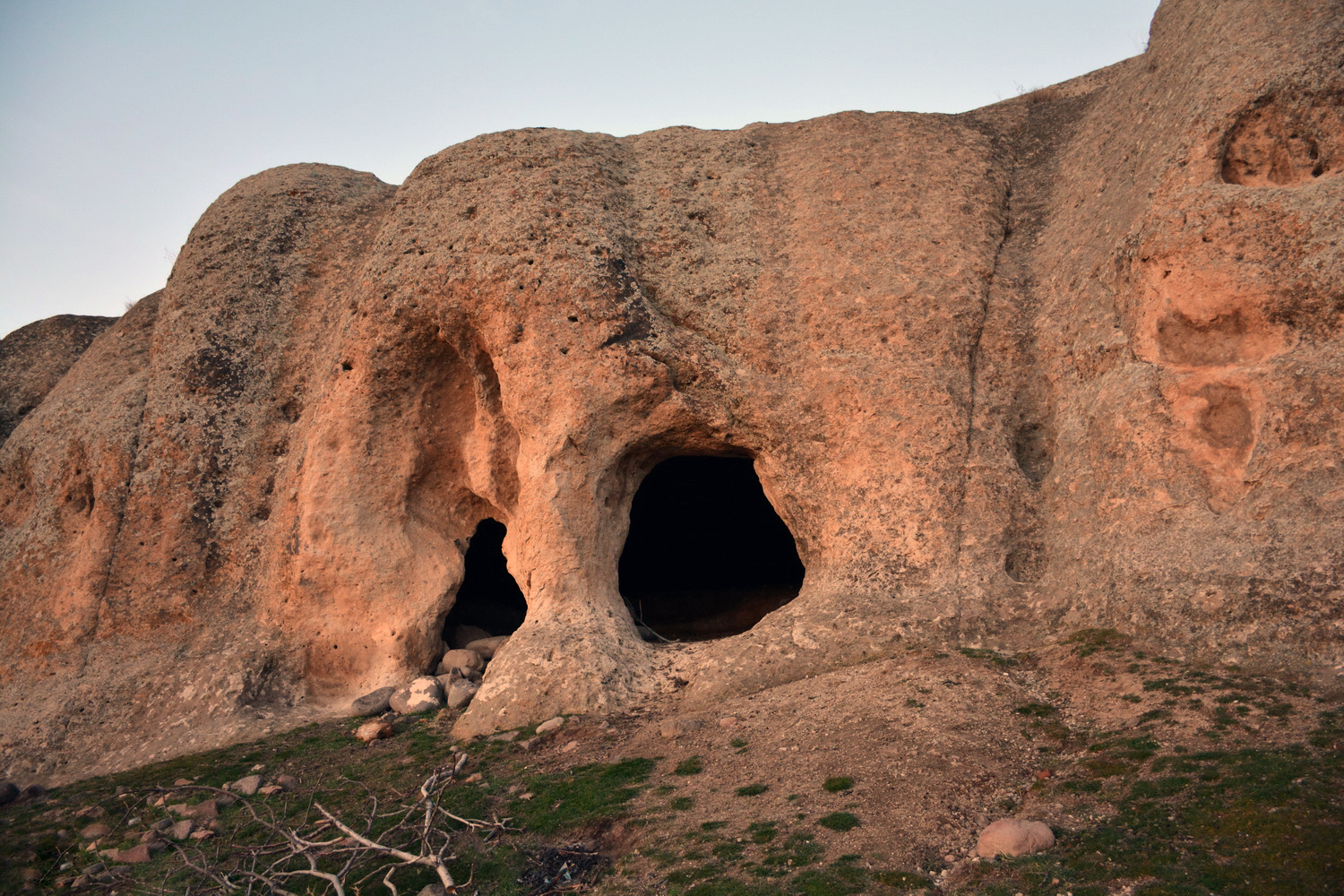
- Handmade caves in the village of Ozbak

- Location of Ahar County in East Azerbaijan province (bottom left, yellow)

- Location of East Azerbaijan province in Iran
- Coordinates: 37°23′N 46°27′E
- Country: Iran
- Province: East Azerbaijan
- Capital: Maragheh
- Districts: Central, Saraju

Population (2016)
  - Total: 262,604
- Time zone: UTC+3:30 (IRST)

Maragheh County (Persian: شهرستان مراغه) is in East Azerbaijan province, Iran. Its capital is the city of Maragheh.

== Demographics ==
=== Population ===
At the time of the 2006 National Census, the county's population was 227,635 in 57,612 households. The following census in 2011 counted 247,681 people in 70,842 households. The 2016 census measured the population of the county as 262,604 in 80,261 households.

=== Administrative divisions ===
Maragheh County's population history and administrative structure over three consecutive censuses are shown in the following table.

Maragheh County Population
| Administrative Divisions | 2006 | 2011 | 2016 |
|---|---|---|---|
| Central District | 205,137 | 226,310 | 240,972 |
| Qareh Naz RD | 14,491 | 15,720 | 15,602 |
| Sarajuy-ye Gharbi RD | 21,577 | 23,836 | 24,465 |
| Sarajuy-ye Shomali RD | 22,664 | 24,479 | 25,650 |
| Maragheh (city) | 146,405 | 162,275 | 175,255 |
| Saraju District | 22,498 | 21,371 | 21,631 |
| Quri Chay-ye Gharbi RD | 4,382 | 4,023 | 3,641 |
| Sarajuy-ye Jonubi RD | 2,961 | 3,224 | 2,957 |
| Sarajuy-ye Sharqi RD | 13,697 | 12,540 | 13,209 |
| Khodaju (city) (Note: Formerly Kharaju) | 1,458 | 1,584 | 1,824 |
| Total | 227,635 | 247,681 | 262,604 |
RD = Rural District

== See also ==
Media related to Maragheh County at Wikimedia Commons
