= Torkampur =

Torkampur تركمپور
- Village
- Location within Iran
- Coordinates: 37°58′25″N 46°49′36″E
- Country: Iran
- Province: East Azerbaijan
- County: Bostanabad
- Bakhsh: Central
- Rural District: Mehranrud-e Markazi

Population (2006)
  - Total: 408
- Time zone: UTC+3:30 (IRST)
  - Summer (DST): UTC+4:30 (IRDT)

Torkampur (Persian: تركمپور, also Romanized as Torkampūr; also known as Torkambūr) is a village in Mehranrud-e Markazi Rural District, in the Central District of Bostanabad County, East Azerbaijan Province, Iran. At the 2006 census, its population was 408, in 90 families.
