= Qaleh-ye Olya =

Qaleh-ye Olya قلعه عليا
- Village
- Location within Iran
- Coordinates: 37°44′11″N 46°46′54″E
- Country: Iran
- Province: East Azerbaijan
- County: Bostanabad
- Bakhsh: Central
- Rural District: Ujan-e Gharbi

Population (2006)
  - Total: 325
- Time zone: UTC+3:30 (IRST)
  - Summer (DST): UTC+4:30 (IRDT)

Qaleh-ye Olya (Persian: قلعه عليا, also Romanized as Qal‘eh-ye ‘Olyā; also known as Kaleh, Qal‘eh, Qal‘eh Bālā, and Qal‘eh-ye Bālā) is a village in Ujan-e Gharbi Rural District, in the Central District of Bostanabad County, East Azerbaijan Province, Iran. At the 2006 census, its population was 325, in 57 families.
