= Kürkənd =

Kürkənd or Kyurtkend or Kurdkand may refer to:

- Kürkənd, Nakhchivan, Azerbaijan
- Kürkənd, Neftchala, Azerbaijan
- Kurdkand, Iran
