= Quzlujeh =

Quzlujeh (Persian: قوزلوجه) may refer to:

- Quzlujeh, Ajab Shir, East Azerbaijan Province
- Quzlujeh, Maragheh, East Azerbaijan Province
- Quzllujeh, East Azerbaijan Province
- Quzlujeh, Hamadan
- Quzlujeh, Shahin Dezh, West Azerbaijan Province
