= Samar Khizan =

Samar Khizan ثمرخيزان
- Village
- Location within Iran
- Coordinates: 37°48′48″N 46°31′59″E
- Country: Iran
- Province: East Azerbaijan
- County: Bostanabad
- Bakhsh: Central
- Rural District: Shebli

Population (2006)
  - Total: 135
- Time zone: UTC+3:30 (IRST)
  - Summer (DST): UTC+4:30 (IRDT)

Samar Khizan (Persian: ثمرخيزان, also Romanized as S̄amar Khīzān; also known as S̄amar Khazān) is a village in Shebli Rural District, in the Central District of Bostanabad County, East Azerbaijan Province, Iran. At the 2006 census, its population was 135, in 23 families.
