= Shebli, East Azerbaijan =

Shebli شبلي
- Village
- Location within Iran
- Coordinates: 37°56′00″N 46°40′00″E
- Country: Iran
- Province: East Azerbaijan
- County: Bostanabad
- Bakhsh: Central
- Rural District: Shebli

Population (2006)
  - Total: 160
- Time zone: UTC+3:30 (IRST)
  - Summer (DST): UTC+4:30 (IRDT)

Shebli (Persian: شبلي, also Romanized as Sheblī; also known as Gardaneh-ye Sheblī and Shibli) is a village in Shebli Rural District, in the Central District of Bostanabad County, East Azerbaijan Province, Iran. At the 2006 census, its population was 160, in 20 families.
