= Tandar Aghaj =

"Tanūr Āghāj" - "Tandar Aghaj" تنورآغاج تندراغاج
- Village
- Location within Iran
- Coordinates: 37°45′40″N 46°43′21″E
- Country: Iran
- Province: East Azerbaijan
- County: Bostanabad
- Bakhsh: Central
- Rural District: Ujan-e Gharbi
- Elevation: 2,020 m (6,630 ft)

Population (2006)
  - Total: 174
- Time zone: UTC+3:30 (IRST)
  - Summer (DST): UTC+4:30 (IRDT)
- Area code: +98 (043)

Tandar Aghaj (Persian: تندراغاج, also Romanized as Tandar Āghāj; also known as Tanūr Āghāj) is a village in Ujan-e Gharbi Rural District, in the Central District of Bostanabad County, East Azerbaijan Province, Iran. At the 2006 census, its population was 174, in 29 families.
