= Amrollah =

Amrollah امرالله
- Village
- Location within Iran
- Coordinates: 37°42′49″N 46°41′00″E
- Country: Iran
- Province: East Azerbaijan
- County: Bostanabad
- Bakhsh: Central
- Rural District: Ujan-e Gharbi

Population (2006)
  - Total: 389
- Time zone: UTC+3:30 (IRST)
  - Summer (DST): UTC+4:30 (IRDT)

Amrollah (Persian: امرالله, also Romanized as Amrollāh) is a village in Ujan-e Gharbi Rural District, in the Central District of Bostanabad County, East Azerbaijan Province, Iran. At the 2006 census, its population was 389, in 63 families.
