= Bashsiz =

Bashsiz باش سيز
- Village
- Location within Iran
- Coordinates: 37°42′21″N 46°44′25″E
- Country: Iran
- Province: East Azerbaijan
- County: Bostanabad
- Bakhsh: Central
- Rural District: Ujan-e Gharbi

Population (2006)
  - Total: 545
- Time zone: UTC+3:30 (IRST)
  - Summer (DST): UTC+4:30 (IRDT)

Bashsiz (Persian: باش سيز, also Romanized as Bāshsīz; also known as Bāshsīz Kūh) is a village in Ujan-e Gharbi Rural District, in the Central District of Bostanabad County, East Azerbaijan Province, Iran. At the 2006 census, its population was 545, in 92 families.
