= Jughan =

Jughan (Persian: جوغان or جوغن) may refer to:

- Jughan-e Bozorg, East Azerbaijan Province (جوغان - Jūghān)
- Jughan-e Kuchak, East Azerbaijan Province (جوغان - Jūghān)
- Jughan, Arzuiyeh, Kerman Province (جوغان - Jūghān)
- Jughan, Rudbar-e Jonubi, Kerman Province (جوغن - Jūghan)

== See also ==
- Juqan
