= Miardan =

Miyardan میاردان
- Village
- Location within Iran
- Coordinates: 37°48′53″N 46°40′29″E
- Country: Iran
- Province: East Azerbaijan
- County: Bostanabad
- Bakhsh: Central
- Rural District: Mehranrud-e Jonubi

Population (2006)
  - Total: 94
- Time zone: UTC+3:30 (IRST)
  - Summer (DST): UTC+4:30 (IRDT)

Miyardan (Persian: میاردان, also Romanized as Miyārdān) is a village in Mehranrud-e Jonubi Rural District, in the Central District of Bostanabad County, East Azerbaijan Province, Iran. At the 2006 census, its population was 94, in 17 families.
