= Musa Qayeh-ye Abu ol Hasan =

Musa Qayeh-ye Abu ol Hasan موسي قيه ابوالحسن
- Village
- Location within Iran
- Coordinates: 37°47′00″N 46°48′00″E
- Country: Iran
- Province: East Azerbaijan
- County: Bostanabad
- Bakhsh: Central
- Rural District: Ujan-e Gharbi

Population (2006)
  - Total: 218
- Time zone: UTC+3:30 (IRST)
  - Summer (DST): UTC+4:30 (IRDT)

Musa Qayeh-ye Abu ol Hasan (Persian: موسي قيه ابوالحسن, also Romanized as Mūsá Qayeh-ye Abū ol Ḩasan; also known as Mūsá Qayeh) is a village in Ujan-e Gharbi Rural District, in the Central District of Bostanabad County, East Azerbaijan Province, Iran. At the 2006 census, its population was 218, in 39 families.
