= Kheyreh Masjed =

Kheyreh Masjed خيره مسجد
- Village
- Location within Iran
- Coordinates: 37°57′30″N 46°43′24″E
- Country: Iran
- Province: East Azerbaijan
- County: Bostanabad
- Bakhsh: Central
- Rural District: Qurigol

Population (2006)
  - Total: 423
- Time zone: UTC+3:30 (IRST)
  - Summer (DST): UTC+4:30 (IRDT)

Kheyreh Masjed (Persian: خيره مسجد, also Romanized as Khīreh Masjed; also known as Kheyna Majīd and Khin Majid) is a village in Qurigol Rural District, in the Central District of Bostanabad County, East Azerbaijan Province, Iran. At the 2006 census, its population was 423, in 91 families.
