= Gurchin =

Gurchin گورچين
- village
- Location within Iran
- Coordinates: 37°55′04″N 46°53′22″E
- Country: Iran
- Province: East Azerbaijan
- County: Bostanabad
- Bakhsh: Central
- Rural District: Mehranrud-e Markazi

Population (2006)
  - Total: 727
- Time zone: UTC+3:30 (IRST)
  - Summer (DST): UTC+4:30 (IRDT)

Govarchin (Turkish: گورچين, also Romanized as Gūrchīn; also known as Govarchīn and Gövərçin) is a village in the Mehranrud-e Markazi Rural District, in the Central District of Bostanabad County, East Azerbaijan Province, Iran. At the 2006 census, its population was 727, in 119 families.
