= Bahador =

Bahador بهادر
- Village
- Location within Iran
- Coordinates: 37°41′51″N 46°41′55″E
- Country: Iran
- Province: East Azerbaijan
- County: Bostanabad
- Bakhsh: Central
- Rural District: Ujan-e Gharbi

Population (2006)
  - Total: 41
- Time zone: UTC+3:30 (IRST)
  - Summer (DST): UTC+4:30 (IRDT)

Bahador (Persian: بهادر, also Romanized as Bahādor) is a village in Ujan-e Gharbi Rural District, in the Central District of Bostanabad County, East Azerbaijan province, Iran. At the 2006 census, its population was 41, in 8 families.
