= Bashsiz Ujan =

Bashsiz Ujan باشسيزاوجان
- Village
- Location within Iran
- Coordinates: 37°48′16″N 46°45′55″E
- Country: Iran
- Province: East Azerbaijan
- County: Bostanabad
- Bakhsh: Central
- Rural District: Ujan-e Gharbi

Population (2006)
  - Total: 466
- Time zone: UTC+3:30 (IRST)
  - Summer (DST): UTC+4:30 (IRDT)

Bashsiz Ujan (Persian: باشسيزاوجان, also Romanized as Bāshsīz Ūjān; also known as Bāsh Sīz) is a village in Ujan-e Gharbi Rural District, in the Central District of Bostanabad County, East Azerbaijan Province, Iran. At the 2006 census, its population was 466, in 81 families.
