= Esfangareh =

Esfangareh اسفنگره
- Village
- Location within Iran
- Coordinates: 37°52′40″N 46°39′33″E
- Country: Iran
- Province: East Azerbaijan
- County: Bostanabad
- Bakhsh: Central
- Rural District: Qurigol

Population (2006)
  - Total: 108
- Time zone: UTC+3:30 (IRST)
  - Summer (DST): UTC+4:30 (IRDT)

Esfangareh (Persian: اسفنگره) is a village in Qurigol Rural District, in the Central District of Bostanabad County, East Azerbaijan Province, Iran. At the 2006 census, its population was 108, in 23 families.
