= Aghurabad =

Aghurabad اغوراباد
- Village
- Location within Iran
- Coordinates: 37°44′40″N 46°48′41″E
- Country: Iran
- Province: East Azerbaijan
- County: Bostanabad
- Bakhsh: Central
- Rural District: Ujan-e Gharbi

Population (2006)
  - Total: 366
- Time zone: UTC+3:30 (IRST)
  - Summer (DST): UTC+4:30 (IRDT)

Aghurabad (Persian: اغوراباد, also Romanized as Āghūrābād; also known as Ūghūrābād) is a village in Ujan-e Gharbi Rural District, in the Central District of Bostanabad County, East Azerbaijan Province, Iran. At the 2006 census, its population was 366, in 54 families.
