= Janbahan =

Janbahan جانبهان
- Village
- Location within Iran
- Coordinates: 37°54′31″N 46°49′16″E
- Country: Iran
- Province: East Azerbaijan
- County: Bostanabad
- Bakhsh: Central
- Rural District: Mehranrud-e Markazi

Population (2006)
  - Total: 692
- Time zone: UTC+3:30 (IRST)
  - Summer (DST): UTC+4:30 (IRDT)

Janbahan (Persian: جانبهان, also Romanized as Jānbahān; also known as Jābnahān) is a village in Mehranrud-e Markazi Rural District, in the Central District of Bostanabad County, East Azerbaijan Province, Iran. At the 2006 census, its population was 692, in 128 families.
