= Galah Khaneh =

Gulaxana گول‌آخانا (گله خانه)
- village
- Location within Iran
- Coordinates: 37°49′08″N 46°38′39″E
- Country: Iran
- Province: East Azerbaijan
- County: Bostanabad
- Bakhsh: Central
- Rural District: Qurigol

Population (1846)
  - Total: 160
- Time zone: UTC+3:30 (IRST)
  - Summer (DST): UTC+4:30 (IRDT)

gülaxana (Persian: (گول‌آخانا)گله خانه, also Romanized as gülaxana; also known as gülaxana) is a village in Qurigol Rural District, in the Central District of Bostanabad County, East Azerbaijan Province, Iran. At the 2006 census, its population was 160, in 32 families.
