= Alvandi, East Azerbaijan =

Alvandi الوندي
- Village
- Location within Iran
- Coordinates: 37°56′31″N 46°47′56″E
- Country: Iran
- Province: East Azerbaijan
- County: Bostanabad
- Bakhsh: Central
- Rural District: Mehranrud-e Markazi

Population (2006)
  - Total: 72
- Time zone: UTC+3:30 (IRST)
  - Summer (DST): UTC+4:30 (IRDT)

Alvandi (Persian: الوندي, also Romanized as Alvandī) is a village in Mehranrud-e Markazi Rural District, in the Central District of Bostanabad County, East Azerbaijan Province, Iran. At the 2006 census, its population was 72, in 12 families, making it one of the smallest villages in Azerbaijan.
