= Ayqer Chaman-e Sofla =

Ayqer Chaman-e Sofla ايقرچمن سفلي
- Village
- Location within Iran
- Coordinates: 37°45′27″N 46°36′56″E
- Country: Iran
- Province: East Azerbaijan
- County: Bostanabad
- Bakhsh: Central
- Rural District: Mehranrud-e Jonubi

Population (2006)
  - Total: 60
- Time zone: UTC+3:30 (IRST)
  - Summer (DST): UTC+4:30 (IRDT)

Ayqer Chaman-e Sofla (Persian: ايقرچمن سفلي, also Romanized as Āyqer Chaman-e Soflá; also known as Āyqer Chaman-e Do) is a village in Mehranrud-e Jonubi Rural District, in the Central District of Bostanabad County, East Azerbaijan Province, Iran. At the 2006 census, its population was 60, in 9 families.
