= Anarjan, Bostanabad =

Anarjan انرجان
- Village
- Location within Iran
- Coordinates: 37°52′26″N 46°59′00″E
- Country: Iran
- Province: East Azerbaijan
- County: Bostanabad
- Bakhsh: Central
- Rural District: Mehranrud-e Markazi

Population (2006)
  - Total: 346
- Time zone: UTC+3:30 (IRST)
  - Summer (DST): UTC+4:30 (IRDT)

Anarjan (Persian: انرجان, also Romanized as Anarjān) is a village in Mehranrud-e Markazi Rural District, in the Central District of Bostanabad County, East Azerbaijan Province, Iran. At the 2006 census, its population was 346, in 70 families.
