= Helan, Bostanabad =

Village in East Azerbaijan province, Iran

Helan Persian: هلان
- Village
- Location within Iran
- Coordinates: 37°50′53″N 46°48′18″E
- Country: Iran
- Province: East Azerbaijan
- County: Bostanabad
- District: Central
- Rural District: Mehranrud-e Jonubi

Population (2016)
  - Total: 361
- Time zone: UTC+3:30 (IRST)

Helan (Persian: هلان) (Note: Also romanized as Helān) is a village in Mehranrud-e Jonubi Rural District of the Central District in Bostanabad County, East Azerbaijan province, Iran.

== Demographics ==
=== Population ===
At the time of the 2006 National Census, the village's population was 346 in 82 households. The following census in 2011 counted 353 people in 86 households. The 2016 census measured the population of the village as 361 people in 112 households.
