= Mehranrud =

Mehranrud (Persian: مهرانرود) may refer to:

- Mehranrud-e Jonubi Rural District
- Mehranrud-e Markazi Rural District
