= Sinabad =

Sinabad (Persian: سين اباد) may refer to:

- Sinabad, East Azerbaijan
- Sinabad, Kerman
- Sinabad, Lorestan
- Sinabad, West Azerbaijan
