= Matanaq =

Village in East Azerbaijan province, Iran

Matanaq Persian: متنق
- Village
- Location within Iran
- Coordinates: 37°50′37″N 46°32′56″E
- Country: Iran
- Province: East Azerbaijan
- County: Bostanabad
- District: Central
- Rural District: Shebli

Population (2016)
  - Total: 440
- Time zone: UTC+3:30 (IRST)

Matanaq (Persian: متنق) (Note: Also romanized as Matnaq; also known as Matana, Matanagh, and Matneh) is a village in Shebli Rural District of the Central District in Bostanabad County, East Azerbaijan province, Iran.

== Demographics ==
=== Population ===
At the time of the 2006 National Census, the village's population was 498 in 115 households. The following census in 2011 counted 436 people in 124 households. The 2016 census measured the population of the village as 440 people in 137 households.
