= Qeran =

Qeran or Qerran (Persian: قران) may refer to:

- Qeran, Gilan
- Qeran, Kurdistan
- Qeran Qayeh
