= Beneh Kohol =

Village in East Azerbaijan province, Iran

Beneh Kohol Persian: بنه كهل
- Village
- Location within Iran
- Coordinates: 37°47′26″N 46°48′46″E
- Country: Iran
- Province: East Azerbaijan
- County: Bostanabad
- District: Central
- Rural District: Ujan-e Gharbi

Population (2016)
  - Total: 568
- Time zone: UTC+3:30 (IRST)

Beneh Kohol (Persian: بنه كهل) (Note: Also known as Nebeh Kohol) is a village in, and the capital of, Ujan-e Gharbi Rural District in the Central District of Bostanabad County, East Azerbaijan province, Iran.

== Demographics ==
=== Population ===
At the time of the 2006 National Census, the village's population was 646 in 143 households. The following census in 2011 counted 594 people in 162 households. The 2016 census measured the population of the village as 568 people in 190 households.
