= Qarah Qishah =

Village in East Azerbaijan, Iran

Qarah Qishah قره قيشه
- Village
- Location within Iran
- Coordinates: 37°41′01″N 47°11′34″E
- Country: Iran
- Province: East Azerbaijan
- County: Bostanabad
- Bakhsh: Tekmeh Dash
- Rural District: Abbas-e Sharqi

Population (2006)
  - Total: 260
- Time zone: UTC+3:30 (IRST)
  - Summer (DST): UTC+4:30 (IRDT)

Qarah Qishah (Persian: قره قيشه, also Romanized as Qarah Qīshah; also known as Qaraqeshteh and Qarqashah) is a village in Abbas-e Sharqi Rural District, Tekmeh Dash District, Bostanabad County, East Azerbaijan Province, Iran. At the 2006 census, its population was 260, in 66 families.
