= Oshdalaq-e Sofla =

Village in East Azerbaijan, Iran

Oshdalaq-e Sofla اشدلق سفلي
- Village
- Location within Iran
- Coordinates: 38°01′27″N 46°58′52″E
- Country: Iran
- Province: East Azerbaijan
- County: Bostanabad
- Bakhsh: Central
- Rural District: Mehranrud-e Markazi

Population (2006)
  - Total: 703
- Time zone: UTC+3:30 (IRST)
  - Summer (DST): UTC+4:30 (IRDT)

Oshdalaq-e Sofla (Persian: اشدلق سفلي, also Romanized as Oshdalaq-e Soflá; also known as Ashdalaq-e Pā'īn, Old Ushtulia, Oshtelaghé Sofla, Oshtelaq-e Pā’īn, Oshtolaq-e Soflá, Oshtolaq Pā’īn, Oshtoq-e Soflá, Ūshdelī-ye Kohneh, Ūshdelī-ye Pā’īn, Ushtulia, and Ushtulya) is a village in Mehranrud-e Markazi Rural District, in the Central District of Bostanabad County, East Azerbaijan Province, Iran. At the 2006 census, its population was 703, in 180 families.
