= Nujeh Deh-e Kuh =

Village in East Azerbaijan province, Iran

Nujeh Deh-e Kuh Persian: نوجه ده كوه
- Village
- Location within Iran
- Coordinates: 37°47′24″N 46°33′28″E
- Country: Iran
- Province: East Azerbaijan
- County: Bostanabad
- District: Central
- Rural District: Qurigol

Population (2016)
  - Total: 662
- Time zone: UTC+3:30 (IRST)

Nujeh Deh-e Kuh (Persian: نوجه ده كوه) (Note: Also romanized as Nūjeh Deh-e Kūh) is a village in Qurigol Rural District of the Central District in Bostanabad County, East Azerbaijan province, Iran.

== Demographics ==
=== Population ===
At the time of the 2006 National Census, the village's population was 700 in 108 households. The following census in 2011 counted 727 people in 168 households. The 2016 census measured the population of the village as 662 people in 147 households.
