= Kyurtchulu =

Kyurtchulu may refer to:

- Kürçülü, Azerbaijan
- Qorçulu, Azerbaijan
