= Hajj Aqa =

Village in East Azerbaijan province, Iran

Hajj Aqa Persian: حاج اقا
- Village
- Location within Iran
- Coordinates: 37°50′31″N 46°47′02″E
- Country: Iran
- Province: East Azerbaijan
- County: Bostanabad
- District: Central
- Rural District: Mehranrud-e Jonubi

Population (2016)
  - Total: 1,443
- Time zone: UTC+3:30 (IRST)

Hajj Aqa (Persian: حاج اقا) (Note: Also romanized as Ḩājj Āqā; also known as Hājī Aqā, Haji Aqu, and Ḩājjī Āqā) is a village in, and the capital of, Mehranrud-e Jonubi Rural District in the Central District of Bostanabad County, East Azerbaijan province, Iran. The previous capital of the rural district was the village of Kargan-e Qadim.

== Demographics ==
=== Population ===
At the time of the 2006 National Census, the village's population was 1,376 in 359 households. The following census in 2011 counted 1,416 people in 456 households. The 2016 census measured the population of the village as 1,443 people in 461 households.
