= Banafsheh Daraq =

Banafsheh Daraq (Persian: بنفشه درق) may refer to:

- Banafsheh Daraq, Ardabil
- Banafsheh Daraq, Bostanabad, East Azerbaijan Province
- Banafsheh Daraq, Charuymaq, East Azerbaijan Province
