= Aliabad, Bostanabad =

Village in East Azerbaijan province, Iran

Aliabad Persian: علی‌آباد
- Village
- Location within Iran
- Coordinates: 37°58′48″N 46°44′32″E
- Country: Iran
- Province: East Azerbaijan
- County: Bostanabad
- District: Central
- Rural District: Qurigol

Population (2016)
  - Total: 1,262
- Time zone: UTC+3:30 (IRST)

Aliabad (Persian: علی‌آباد) (Note: Also romanized as ‘Alīābād) is a village in Qurigol Rural District of the Central District in Bostanabad County, East Azerbaijan province, Iran.

== Demographics ==
=== Population ===
At the time of the 2006 National Census, the village's population was 1,250 in 342 households. The following census in 2011 counted 1,241 people in 362 households. The 2016 census measured the population of the village as 1,262 people in 394 households.
