= Ayqer Chaman =

Ayqer Chaman (Persian: ايقرچمن) may refer to:

- Ayqer Chaman-e Olya
- Ayqer Chaman-e Sofla
