= Anbar Dan =

Anbar Dan or Anbardan (Persian: انباردان) may refer to:

- Anbar Dan, Bostanabad
- Anbardan, Charuymaq
