= Sisan-e Qadim =

Sisan-e Qadim سيسان قديم
- Village
- Location within Iran
- Coordinates: 37°50′17″N 46°45′50″E
- Country: Iran
- Province: East Azerbaijan
- County: Bostanabad
- Bakhsh: Central
- Rural District: Mehranrud-e Jonubi

Population (2006)
  - Total: 41
- Time zone: UTC+3:30 (IRST)
  - Summer (DST): UTC+4:30 (IRDT)

Sisan-e Qadim (Persian: سيسان قديم, also Romanized as Sīsān-e Qadīm; also known as Sīsān, Sīsān-e Now, Sīsān-e Qadīmī, and Valī-ye ‘Aşr) is a village in Mehranrud-e Jonubi Rural District, in the Central District of Bostanabad County, East Azerbaijan Province, Iran. At the 2006 census, its population was 41, in 9 families.
