= Zangbar, East Azerbaijan =

Zangbar زنگبار
- Village
- Location within Iran
- Coordinates: 37°45′26″N 46°44′41″E
- Country: Iran
- Province: East Azerbaijan
- County: Bostanabad
- Bakhsh: Central
- Rural District: Ujan-e Gharbi

Population (2006)
  - Total: 64
- Time zone: UTC+3:30 (IRST)
  - Summer (DST): UTC+4:30 (IRDT)

Zangbar (Persian: زنگبار, also Romanized as Zangbār) is a village in Ujan-e Gharbi Rural District, in the Central District of Bostanabad County, East Azerbaijan Province, Iran. At the 2006 census, its population was 64, in 11 families.
