= Charzeh Khun =

Village in East Azerbaijan province, Iran

Charzeh Khun Persian: چرزه خون
- Village
- Location within Iran
- Coordinates: 37°48′27″N 46°50′56″E
- Country: Iran
- Province: East Azerbaijan
- County: Bostanabad
- District: Central
- Rural District: Ujan-e Gharbi

Population (2016)
  - Total: 1,679
- Time zone: UTC+3:30 (IRST)

Charzeh Khun (Persian: چرزه خون) (Note: Also romanized as Charzeh Khūn) is a village in Ujan-e Gharbi Rural District of the Central District in Bostanabad County, East Azerbaijan province, Iran.

== Demographics ==
=== Population ===
At the time of the 2006 National Census, the village's population was 1,548 in 334 households. The following census in 2011 counted 1,709 people in 428 households. The 2016 census measured the population of the village as 1,679 people in 463 households. It was the most populous village in its rural district.
