= Alvandi =

Alvandi (Persian: الوندي) may refer to:

- Alvandi, East Azerbaijan
- Alvandi, Qazvin
