= Oshdalaq, Bostanabad =

Oshdalaq (Persian: اشدلق) in Bostanabad County, also rendered as Oshtolaq or Oshdalaq or Oshtelaghe or Oshtelaq or Ashdalaq and also known as Ushdeli or Oshtoq or Ushtulia or Ushtulya, may refer to:

- Oshdalaq-e Olya
- Oshdalaq-e Sofla
