= Turaqiyeh =

Village in East Azerbaijan province, Iran

Turaqiyeh Persian: طوراقيه
- Village
- Location within Iran
- Coordinates: 37°55′25″N 46°53′03″E
- Country: Iran
- Province: East Azerbaijan
- County: Bostanabad
- District: Central
- Rural District: Mehranrud-e Markazi

Population (2016)
  - Total: 1,032
- Time zone: UTC+3:30 (IRST)

Turaqiyeh (Persian: طوراقيه) (Note: Also known as Ţūrāghāy, Turaqayeh, and Tūrāqayeh) is a village in Mehranrud-e Markazi Rural District of the Central District in Bostanabad County, East Azerbaijan province, Iran.

== Demographics ==
=== Population ===
At the time of the 2006 National Census, the village's population was 896 in 159 households. The following census in 2011 counted 923 people in 196 households. The 2016 census measured the population of the village as 1,032 people in 269 households.
