= Seqin Saray =

Village in East Azerbaijan province, Iran

Seqin Saray Persian: سقين سراي
- Village
- Location within Iran
- Coordinates: 37°59′48″N 46°55′27″E
- Country: Iran
- Province: East Azerbaijan
- County: Bostanabad
- District: Central
- Rural District: Mehranrud-e Markazi

Population (2016)
  - Total: 2,077
- Time zone: UTC+3:30 (IRST)

Seqin Saray (Persian: سقين سراي) (Note: Also romanized as Seqīn Sarāy; also known as Sekān Saray (سکان سراي) and Seqīn Sarā) is a village in Mehranrud-e Markazi Rural District of the Central District in Bostanabad County, East Azerbaijan province, Iran.

== Demographics ==
=== Population ===
At the time of the 2006 National Census, the village's population was 2,272 in 357 households. The following census in 2011 counted 2,268 people in 586 households. The 2016 census measured the population of the village as 2,077 people in 575 households.
