= Iranaq =

Village in East Azerbaijan province, Iran

Iranaq Persian: ايرانق
- Village
- Location within Iran
- Coordinates: 37°53′55″N 46°34′56″E
- Country: Iran
- Province: East Azerbaijan
- County: Bostanabad
- District: Central
- Rural District: Shebli

Population (2016)
  - Total: 2,675
- Time zone: UTC+3:30 (IRST)

Iranaq (Persian: ايرانق) (Note: Also romanized as Īrānaq; also known as Irāna, Iranagh, Īrānak, and Iraniq) is a village in Shebli Rural District of the Central District in Bostanabad County, East Azerbaijan province, Iran.

== Demographics ==
=== Population ===
At the time of the 2006 National Census, the village's population was 2,616 in 602 households. The following census in 2011 counted 2,680 people in 740 households. The 2016 census measured the population of the village as 2,675 people in 788 households.
