= Torkeh Dari =

Village in East Azerbaijan province, Iran

Torkeh Dari Persian: تركه داري
- Village
- Location within Iran
- Coordinates: 38°03′59″N 46°41′34″E
- Country: Iran
- Province: East Azerbaijan
- County: Bostanabad
- District: Central
- Rural District: Qurigol

Population (2016)
  - Total: 659
- Time zone: UTC+3:30 (IRST)

Torkeh Dari (Persian: تركه داري) (Note: Also romanized as Torkeh Dārī; also known as Gurka-Derre, Turka Darreh, and Turka-Dara) is a village in Qurigol Rural District of the Central District in Bostanabad County, East Azerbaijan province, Iran.

== Demographics ==
=== Population ===
At the time of the 2006 National Census, the village's population was 771 in 158 households. The following census in 2011 counted 681 people in 163 households. The 2016 census measured the population of the village as 659 people in 179 households.
