= Alanaq =

Village in East Azerbaijan province, Iran

Alanagh Alanagh Persian: الانق
- Village
- Location within Iran
- Coordinates: 38°00′39″N 46°42′50″E
- Country: Iran
- Province: East Azerbaijan
- County: Bostanabad
- District: Central
- Rural District: Qurigol

Population (2016)
  - Total: 3,646
- Time zone: UTC+3:30 (IRST)

Alanagh (Persian: الانق) (Note: Also romanized as Alanagh and Ālānaq; also known as Alana) is a village in Qurigol Rural District of the Central District in Bostanabad County, East Azerbaijan province, Iran.

== Demographics ==
=== Population ===
At the time of the 2006 National Census, the village's population was 3,434 in 954 households. The following census in 2011 counted 3,705 people in 1,123 households. The 2016 census measured the population of the village as 3,646 people in 1,164 households. It was the most populous village in its rural district.
