= Kargan-e Qadim =

Village in East Azerbaijan province, Iran

Kargan-e Qadim Persian: كرگان قديم
- Village
- Location within Iran
- Coordinates: 37°51′39″N 46°42′20″E
- Country: Iran
- Province: East Azerbaijan
- County: Bostanabad
- District: Central
- Rural District: Mehranrud-e Jonubi

Population (2016)
  - Total: 2,742
- Time zone: UTC+3:30 (IRST)

Kargan-e Qadim (Persian: كرگان قديم) (Note: Also romanized as Kargān-e Qadīm; also known as Kargān and Karkan) is a village in, and the former capital of, Mehranrud-e Jonubi Rural District in the Central District of Bostanabad County, East Azerbaijan province, Iran. The capital of the rural district has been transferred to the village of Hajj Aqa.

== Demographics ==
=== Population ===
At the time of the 2006 National Census, the village's population was 906 in 193 households. The following census in 2011 counted 2,821 people in 670 households. The 2016 census measured the population of the village as 2,742 people in 729 households. It was the most populous village in its rural district.
