= Qaysh Qur Shaq =

Qaysh Qur Shaq قايش قورشاق
- village
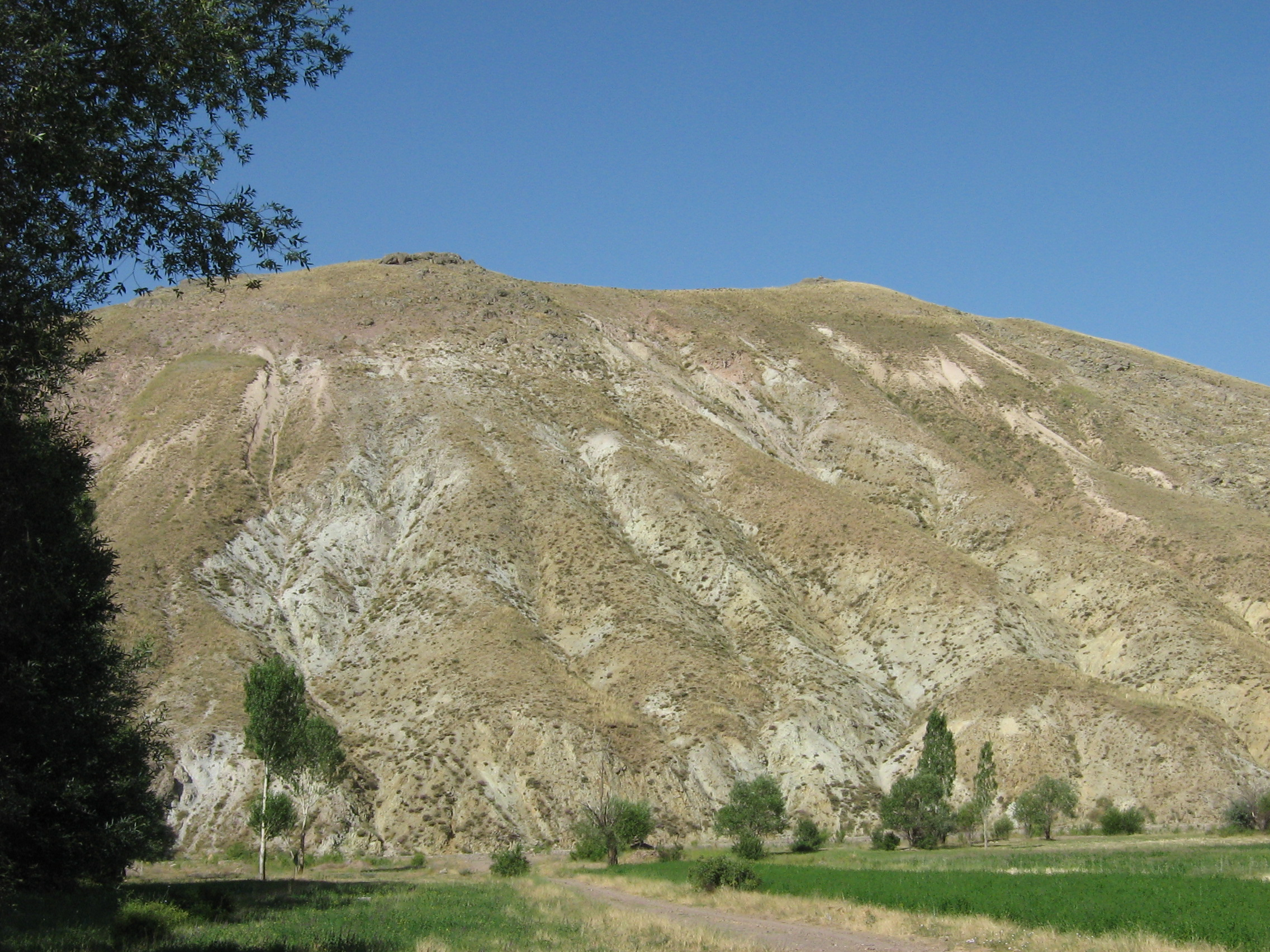
- View of Heydar Baba Mountain

- Location within Iran
- Coordinates: 37°41′41″N 47°09′01″E
- Country: Iran
- Province: East Azerbaijan
- County: Bostanabad
- Bakhsh: Tekmeh Dash
- Rural District: Abbas-e Sharqi

Population (2006)
  - Total: 100
- Time zone: UTC+3:30 (IRST)
  - Summer (DST): UTC+4:30 (IRDT)

Qayesh QurShaq (Persian: قايش قورشاق, also Romanized as Qayesh Qūr Shāq and Qāyesh QūrShāq) is a village in Abbas-e Sharqi Rural District, Tekmeh Dash District, Bostanabad County, East Azerbaijan Province, Iran. At the 2006 census, its population was 100, in 35 families. More detail information about culture people of Qayesh Qurshaq can be found in Heydar Babaya Salam of Mohammad Hossein Shahriar, a famous Iranian Azerbaijani poet, who spent early years of his life in Qayesh Qurshaq. And the name of Shahryar poetical work, coming from the name of the mountain "Heydar Baba".
