= Saidabad, Bostanabad =

Village in East Azerbaijan province, Iran

Saidabad Persian: سعيداباد
- Village
- Location within Iran
- Coordinates: 37°56′55″N 46°35′01″E
- Country: Iran
- Province: East Azerbaijan
- County: Bostanabad
- District: Central
- Rural District: Shebli

Population (2016)
  - Total: 3,054
- Time zone: UTC+3:30 (IRST)

Saidabad (Persian: سعيداباد) (Note: Also romanized as Sa‘īdābād; also known as Sa‘dābād) is a village in, and the capital of, Shebli Rural District in the Central District of Bostanabad County, East Azerbaijan province, Iran.

== Demographics ==
=== Population ===
At the time of the 2006 National Census, the village's population was 3,199 in 913 households. The following census in 2011 counted 3,119 people in 882 households. The 2016 census measured the population of the village as 3,054 people in 858 households. It was the most populous village in its rural district.
