= Gol Akhar =

Village in East Azerbaijan province, Iran

Gol Akhar Persian: گل اخور
- Village
- Location within Iran
- Coordinates: 37°40′33″N 46°40′25″E
- Country: Iran
- Province: East Azerbaijan
- County: Bostanabad
- District: Central
- Rural District: Ujan-e Gharbi

Population (2016)
  - Total: 723
- Time zone: UTC+3:30 (IRST)

Golakhvor (Persian: گل اخور) (Note: Also romanized as Golākhūr and Golākhvor; also known as Kūrah Khīl, Kūrehl, Kuriagil, and Kyuryagil’) is a village in Ujan-e Gharbi Rural District of the Central District in Bostanabad County, East Azerbaijan province, Iran.

== Demographics ==
=== Population ===
At the time of the 2006 National Census, the village's population was 813 in 158 households. The following census in 2011 counted 818 people in 183 households. The 2016 census measured the population of the village as 723 people in 179 households.
