= Saran, East Azerbaijan =

Village in East Azerbaijan province, Iran

Saran Persian: ساران
- Village
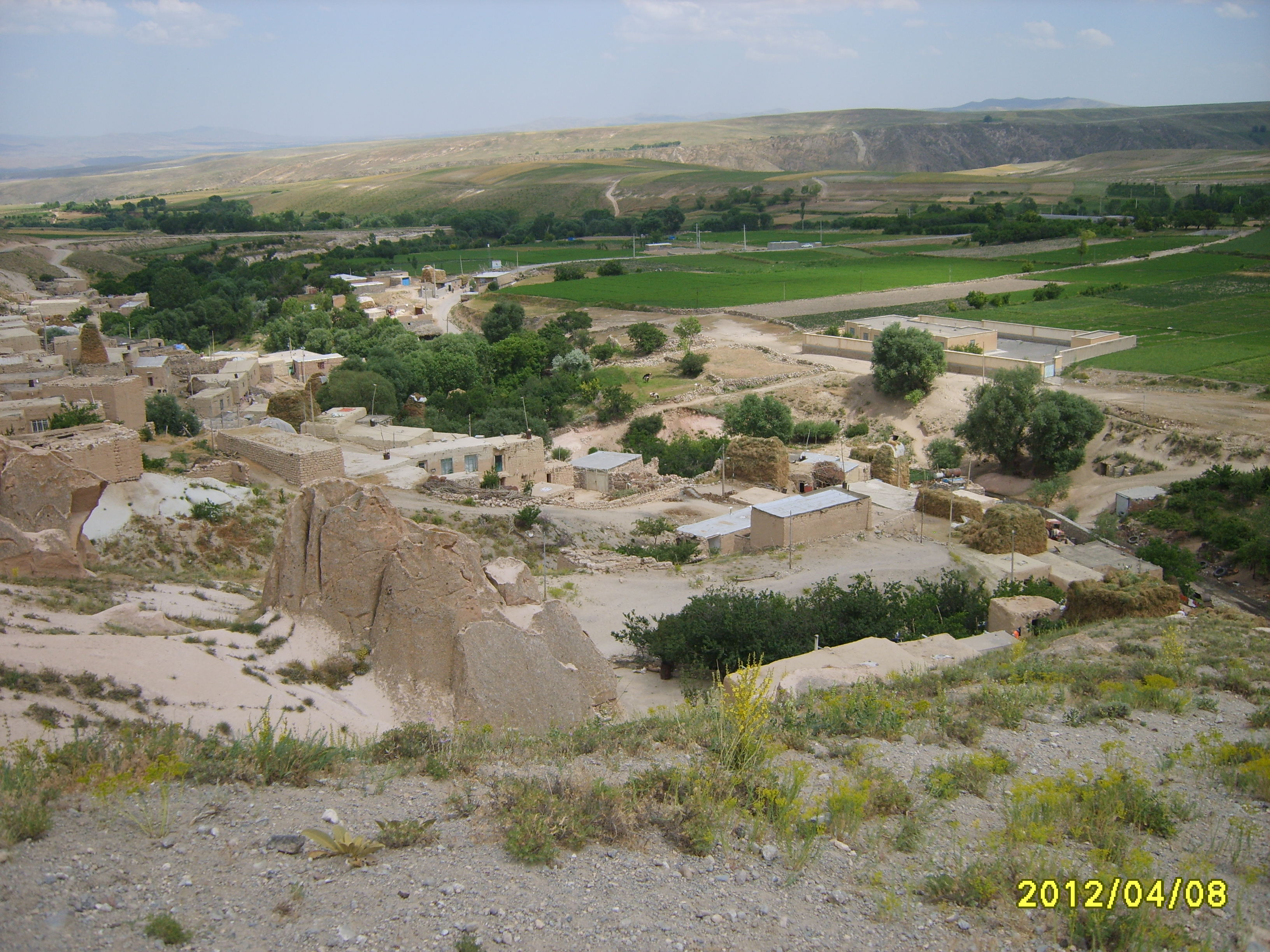
- The village of Saran, Bostanabad

- Location within Iran
- Coordinates: 37°50′30″N 46°41′09″E
- Country: Iran
- Province: East Azerbaijan
- County: Bostanabad
- District: Central
- Rural District: Mehranrud-e Jonubi

Population (2016)
  - Total: 304
- Time zone: UTC+3:30 (IRST)

Saran (Persian: ساران) (Note: Also romanized as Sarān) is a village in Mehranrud-e Jonubi Rural District of the Central District in Bostanabad County, East Azerbaijan province, Iran.

== Demographics ==
=== Population ===
At the time of the 2006 National Census, the village's population was 333 in 50 households. The following census in 2011 counted 317 people in 73 households. The 2016 census measured the population of the village as 304 people in 81 households.
