= Kheyrabad, Bostanabad =

Village in East Azerbaijan province, Iran

Kheyrabad Persian: خيراباد
- Village
- Location within Iran
- Coordinates: 37°49′27″N 46°48′02″E
- Country: Iran
- Province: East Azerbaijan
- County: Bostanabad
- District: Central
- Rural District: Ujan-e Gharbi

Population (2016)
  - Total: 632
- Time zone: UTC+3:30 (IRST)

Kheyrabad (Persian: خيراباد) (Note: Also romanized as Kheyrābād) is a village in Ujan-e Gharbi Rural District of the Central District in Bostanabad County, East Azerbaijan province, Iran.

== Demographics ==
=== Population ===
At the time of the 2006 National Census, the village's population was 569 in 113 households. The following census in 2011 counted 567 people in 144 households. The 2016 census measured the population of the village as 632 people in 174 households.
