= Akinabad =

Village in East Azerbaijan province, Iran

Akinabad Persian: اكين اباد
- Village
- Location within Iran
- Coordinates: 37°54′04″N 46°45′27″E
- Country: Iran
- Province: East Azerbaijan
- County: Bostanabad
- District: Central
- Rural District: Mehranrud-e Jonubi

Population (2016)
  - Total: 525
- Time zone: UTC+3:30 (IRST)

Akinabad (Persian: اكين اباد) (Note: Also romanized as Akīnābād; also known as Akīnābād-e Qadīm) is a village in Mehranrud-e Jonubi Rural District of the Central District in Bostanabad County, East Azerbaijan province, Iran.

== Demographics ==
=== Population ===
At the time of the 2006 National Census, the village's population was 514 in 106 households. The following census in 2011 counted 493 people in 124 households. The 2016 census measured the population of the village as 525 people in 147 households.
