= Ayqer Chaman-e Olya =

Ayqer Chaman-e Olya ايقرچمن عليا
- Village
- Location within Iran
- Coordinates: 37°46′01″N 46°36′30″E
- Country: Iran
- Province: East Azerbaijan
- County: Bostanabad
- Bakhsh: Central
- Rural District: Mehranrud-e Jonubi

Population (2006)
  - Total: 88
- Time zone: UTC+3:30 (IRST)
  - Summer (DST): UTC+4:30 (IRDT)

Ayqer Chaman-e Olya (Persian: ايقرچمن عليا, also Romanized as Āyqer Chaman-e ‘Olyā; also known as Āyqer Chaman-e Yek) is a village in Mehranrud-e Jonubi Rural District, in the Central District of Bostanabad County, East Azerbaijan Province, Iran. At the 2006 census, its population was 88, in 18 families.
