= Qezelejah Meydan =

Village in East Azerbaijan province, Iran

Qezelejah Meydan Persian: قزلجه ميدان
- Village
- Location within Iran
- Coordinates: 37°59′21″N 46°32′38″E
- Country: Iran
- Province: East Azerbaijan
- County: Bostanabad
- District: Central
- Rural District: Shebli

Population (2016)
  - Total: 1,018
- Time zone: UTC+3:30 (IRST)

Qezelejah Meydan (Persian: قزلجه ميدان) (Note: Also romanized as Qezelejah Meydān and Qezelejeh-ye Meydān) is a village in Shebli Rural District of the Central District in Bostanabad County, East Azerbaijan province, Iran.

== Demographics ==
=== Population ===
At the time of the 2006 National Census, the village's population was 1,054 in 279 households. The following census in 2011 counted 1,106 people in 309 households. The 2016 census measured the population of the village as 1,018 people in 296 households.
