= Nowjeh Deh-e Sadat =

Village in East Azerbaijan province, Iran

Nowjeh Deh-e Sadat Persian: نوجه ده سادات
- Village
- Location within Iran
- Coordinates: 37°54′37″N 46°57′47″E
- Country: Iran
- Province: East Azerbaijan
- County: Bostanabad
- District: Central
- Rural District: Mehranrud-e Markazi

Population (2016)
  - Total: 1,527
- Time zone: UTC+3:30 (IRST)

Nowjeh Deh-e Sadat (Persian: نوجه ده سادات) (Note: Also romanized as Nowjé Dehé Sadat, Nowjeh Deh Sādāt, Nowjeh Deh-e Sādāt, and Nowjeh Deh-ye Sādāt; also known as Nagādi and Naqādi)) is a village in, and the capital of, Mehranrud-e Markazi Rural District in the Central District of Bostanabad County, East Azerbaijan province, Iran. The previous capital of the rural district was the village of Kord Kandi, now a city.

== Demographics ==
=== Population ===
At the time of the 2006 National Census, the village's population was 1,918 in 431 households. The following census in 2011 counted 1,747 people in 447 households. The 2016 census measured the population of the village as 1,527 people in 489 households.
