= Kor, East Azerbaijan =

Village in East Azerbaijan province, Iran

Kor Persian: كر
- Village
- Location within Iran
- Coordinates: 38°00′47″N 46°46′15″E
- Country: Iran
- Province: East Azerbaijan
- County: Bostanabad
- District: Central
- Rural District: Qurigol

Population (2016)
  - Total: 1,948
- Time zone: UTC+3:30 (IRST)

Kor (Persian: كر) (Note: Also known as Khowr, Khūr, and Kur) is a village in Qurigol Rural District of the Central District in Bostanabad County, East Azerbaijan province, Iran.

== Demographics ==
=== Population ===
At the time of the 2006 National Census, the village's population was 2,367 in 554 households. The following census in 2011 counted 2,105 people in 560 households. The 2016 census measured the population of the village as 1,948 people in 584 households.
