= Qarah Kowshan =

Village in East Azerbaijan province, Iran

Qarah Kowshan Persian: قره كوشن
- Village
- Location within Iran
- Coordinates: 37°42′56″N 46°43′59″E
- Country: Iran
- Province: East Azerbaijan
- County: Bostanabad
- District: Central
- Rural District: Ujan-e Gharbi

Population (2016)
  - Total: 725
- Time zone: UTC+3:30 (IRST)

Qarah Kowshan (Persian: قره كوشن) (Note: Also romanized as Qarah Kūshan) is a village in Ujan-e Gharbi Rural District of the Central District in Bostanabad County, East Azerbaijan province, Iran.

== Demographics ==
=== Population ===
At the time of the 2006 National Census, the village's population was 844 in 138 households. The following census in 2011 counted 792 people in 216 households. The 2016 census measured the population of the village as 725 people in 200 households.
