= Qashqai =

Qashqai or Qashqay may refer to:

- Nissan Qashqai, a compact crossover SUV
- Qashqai people
- Qashqai language
- Hoseynabad-e Qashqai, village in Tehran Province, Iran
- Qashqay (village), a village in East Azerbaijan Province, Iran

== People with the surname ==
- Mirali Qashqai (1907–1977), Azerbaijani geologist
