= Golehin =

Village in East Azerbaijan province, Iran

Golehin Persian: گلهين
- Village
- Location within Iran
- Coordinates: 37°38′44″N 47°07′07″E
- Country: Iran
- Province: East Azerbaijan
- County: Bostanabad
- District: Tikmeh Dash
- Rural District: Abbas-e Sharqi

Population (2016)
  - Total: 119
- Time zone: UTC+3:30 (IRST)

Golehin (Persian: گلهين,) (Note: Also romanized as Gelehīn and Golehīn; also known as Kalin) is a village in Abbas-e Sharqi Rural District of Tikmeh Dash District in Bostanabad County, East Azerbaijan province, Iran.

== Demographics ==
=== Population ===
At the time of the 2006 National Census, the village's population was 197 in 49 households. The following census in 2011 counted 141 people in 40 households. The 2016 census measured the population of the village as 119 people in 46 households.
