= Juqan-e Bozorg =

Village in East Azerbaijan province, Iran

Juqan-e Bozorg Persian: جوقان بزرگ
- Village
- Location within Iran
- Coordinates: 37°47′27″N 46°43′21″E
- Country: Iran
- Province: East Azerbaijan
- County: Bostanabad
- District: Central
- Rural District: Ujan-e Gharbi
- Established: c. 475 B.C.

Area
  - Total: 2.002 km^{2} (0.773 sq mi)

Population (2016)
  - Total: 840
  - Density: 420/km^{2} (1,100/sq mi)
- Time zone: UTC+3:30 (IRST)
- Area code: 984335

Juqan-e Bozorg (Persian: جوقان بزرگ) (Note: Also romanized as Jūqān-e Bozorg; also known as Jūghān-e Bozorg) is a village in Ujan-e Gharbi Rural District of the Central District in Bostanabad County, East Azerbaijan province, Iran.

== Demographics ==
=== Population ===
At the time of the 2006 National Census, the village's population was 793 in 112 households. The following census in 2011 counted 816 people in 213 households. The 2016 census measured the population of the village as 840 people in 228 households.
