= Banafsheh Daraq, Bostanabad =

Banafsheh Daraq بنفشه درق
- Village
- Location within Iran
- Coordinates: 37°38′05″N 47°04′17″E
- Country: Iran
- Province: East Azerbaijan
- County: Bostanabad
- Bakhsh: Tekmeh Dash
- Rural District: Abbas-e Sharqi

Population (2006)
  - Total: 24
- Time zone: UTC+3:30 (IRST)
  - Summer (DST): UTC+4:30 (IRDT)

Banafsheh Daraq (Persian: بنفشه درق) is a village in Abbas-e Sharqi Rural District, Tekmeh Dash District, Bostanabad County, East Azerbaijan Province, Iran. At the 2006 census, its population was 24, in 11 families.
