= Sisan =

Sisan may refer to:

- Šišan, Croatia
- Sisan, Iran
