= Juqan-e Kuchak =

Village in East Azerbaijan province, Iran

Juqan-e Kuchak Persian: جوقان کوچک
- Village
- Location within Iran
- Coordinates: 37°46′45″N 46°46′38″E
- Country: Iran
- Province: East Azerbaijan
- County: Bostanabad
- District: Central
- Rural District: Ujan-e Gharbi

Population (2016)
  - Total: 526
- Time zone: UTC+3:30 (IRST)

Juqan-e Kuchak (Persian: جوقان کوچک) (Note: Also romanized as Jūqān-e Kūchak; also known as Jūghān-e Kūchak and Jūqān (جوقان)) is a village in Ujan-e Gharbi Rural District of the Central District in Bostanabad County, East Azerbaijan province, Iran.

== Demographics ==
=== Population ===
At the time of the 2006 National Census, the village's population was 484 in 83 households. The following census in 2011 counted 544 people in 130 households. The 2016 census measured the population of the village as 526 people in 127 households.
