= Zarrin Qaba =

Village in East Azerbaijan province, Iran

Zarrin Qaba Persian: زرين قبا
- Village
- Location within Iran
- Coordinates: 37°43′10″N 47°12′10″E
- Country: Iran
- Province: East Azerbaijan
- County: Bostanabad
- District: Tikmeh Dash
- Rural District: Abbas-e Sharqi

Population (2016)
  - Total: 155
- Time zone: UTC+3:30 (IRST)

Zarrin Qaba (Persian: زرين قبا) (Note: Also romanized as Zarrīn Qabā) is a village in Abbas-e Sharqi Rural District of Tikmeh Dash District in Bostanabad County, East Azerbaijan province, Iran.

== Demographics ==
=== Population ===
At the time of the 2006 National Census, the village's population was 438 in 100 households. The following census in 2011 counted 226 people in 74 households. The 2016 census measured the population of the village as 155 people in 68 households.
