= Shangolabad =

Shangolabad (Persian: شنگل اباد) may refer to:

- Shangolabad, Bostanabad
- Shangolabad, Shabestar
