= Anbar Dan, Bostanabad =

Village in East Azerbaijan province, Iran

Anbar Dan Persian: انباردان
- Village
- Location within Iran
- Coordinates: 37°51′56″N 46°56′24″E
- Country: Iran
- Province: East Azerbaijan
- County: Bostanabad
- District: Central
- Rural District: Mehranrud-e Markazi

Population (2016)
  - Total: 1,553
- Time zone: UTC+3:30 (IRST)

Anbar Dan (Persian: انباردان) (Note: Also romanized as Anbār Dān) is a village in Mehranrud-e Markazi Rural District of the Central District in Bostanabad County, East Azerbaijan province, Iran.

== Demographics ==
=== Population ===
At the time of the 2006 National Census, the village's population was 1,733 in 450 households. The following census in 2011 counted 1,656 people in 479 households. The 2016 census measured the population of the village as 1,553 people in 492 households.
