= Oshdalaq-e Olya =

Village in East Azerbaijan province, Iran

Oshdalaq-e Olya Persian: اشدلق عليا
- Village
- Location within Iran
- Coordinates: 38°00′22″N 46°59′19″E
- Country: Iran
- Province: East Azerbaijan
- County: Bostanabad
- District: Central
- Rural District: Mehranrud-e Markazi

Population (2016)
  - Total: 1,063
- Time zone: UTC+3:30 (IRST)

Oshdalaq-e Olya (Persian: اشدلق عليا) (Note: Also romanized as Oshdalaq-e ‘Olyā; also known as Ashdalaq-e Bālā, Oshtelaghé Olya, Oshtelaq-e Bālā, Oshtolaq Bālā, Oshtolaq-e ‘Olyā, Oshtoq-e ‘Olyā, Ūshdelī-ye Bālā, Ūshdelī-ye Tāzeh, and Ushtulia) is a village in Mehranrud-e Markazi Rural District of the Central District in Bostanabad County, East Azerbaijan province, Iran.

== Demographics ==
=== Population ===
At the time of the 2006 National Census, the village's population was 1,013 in 196 households. The following census in 2011 counted 1,103 people in 257 households. The 2016 census measured the population of the village as 1,063 people in 275 households.
