= Rosamond (1776 ship) =

History

Great Britain
- Name: Rose
- Launched: 1771, New York
- Renamed: Rosamond (1776)

General characteristics
- Tons burthen: 180, or 194, or 200 (bm)
- Complement: 20
- Armament: 1781: 8 × 3-pounder guns; 1797:10 × 4-pounder guns; 1801: 2 guns

Rosamond was launched at New York in 1771, probably as Rose. She was renamed Rosamond in 1776. Between 1795 and 1800, she made four voyages as a Liverpool-based slave ship, carrying enslaved people from West Africa to the West Indies (the Middle Passage in the triangular trade). She then became a West Indiaman until in 1804, a French privateer captured her.

== Career ==
Rosamond first appeared in Lloyd's Register (LR) in 1776, with the entry showing her name change.

Year	Master	Owner	Trade	Source & notes
1776	John Harrison; Southgate	Yates & Co. J.Blackburn	New York–London	LR
1781	Christall	Young & Co.	London–Halifax, Nova Scotia	LR
1786	R. Angus	Leitch & Co.	Greenock–Grenada	LR
1791	R. Angus	Leitch & Co.	Greenock–Grenada	LR
1795	T. Boyd; W. Leece	Rankin	Greenock–Barbados; Liverpool–Africa	LR; good repair 1791 & repairs 1793
1797	Leece	[James] Penny & Co.	Liverpool–Africa	LR; good repair 1791, damages repaired 1794, & repairs 1795

=== 1st voyage transporting enslaved people (1795–1796) ===
Captain William Lace sailed from Liverpool on 7 October 1795, bound for Abriz, Angola. Rosamond started acquiring her slaves on 24 January 1796, and sailed from Ambriz on 8 June. She arrived at Dominica on 20 July, with 323 captives. She sailed from Dominica on 11 August, and arrived back at Liverpool on 8 October. She had left Liverpool with 23 crew members and she suffered four crew deaths on the voyage.

=== 2nd voyage transporting enslaved people (1797) ===
Captain John Foulkes acquired a letter of marque on 7 January 1797. Rosamond sailed from Liverpool on 24 January, bound for West Africa. She arrived at Barbados on 4 November, with 316 captives. She left Barbados on 20 November, and arrived back at Liverpool on 24 December. She had left Liverpool with 23 crew members and suffered one crew death on her voyage.

=== 3rd voyage transporting enslaved people (1798–1799) ===
By one report, Captain Foulkes sailed from Liverpool on 14 May 1798, bound for West Africa. By another report, she was bound for Angola. Under the strictures of Dolben's Act, her legal capacity was 323 captives. Rosamond arrived at Martinique on 20 March 1799, with 283 captives. She arrived back at Liverpool on 28 June. She had left Liverpool with 28 crew members and suffered no crew deaths on the voyage.

=== 4th voyage transporting enslaved people (1799–1800) ===
Captain Foulkes sailed from Liverpool on 28 September 1799, bound for West Africa. Rosamond arrived at Kingston, Jamaica, on 7 September 1800, with 317 slaves. She sailed from Kingston on 13 October, and arrived back at Liverpool on 17 December. She had sailed from Liverpool with 30 crew members and she had suffered two crew deaths on the voyage.

Year	Master	Owner	Trade	Source & notes
1801	J.Foulkes; W.Cottrell	Penny & Co.	Liverpool–Africa	LR; good repair 1791, damages repaired 1794, & repairs 1795
1805	W.Connell	Rankins	Greenock–Charleston	LR; good repair 1791, damages repaired 1794, repairs 1795, & good repairs 1801

== Fate ==
In May 1804, the French privateer Africaine was sailing from Havana with 358 French troops that had escaped from St. Domingo that she was carrying back to France. On her way, and shortly before being herself captured, Africaine captured two British merchant vessels, Rosamond, of Glasgow, and the brig Chance, of Jamaica.

The entry for Rosamond in the issue of LR for 1805 bears the annotation "captured".
