= Siyah Nab =

Village in East Azerbaijan province, Iran

Siyah Nab Persian: سيه ناب
- Village
- Location within Iran
- Coordinates: 37°55′40″N 46°53′52″E
- Country: Iran
- Province: East Azerbaijan
- County: Bostanabad
- District: Central
- Rural District: Mehranrud-e Markazi

Population (2016)
  - Total: 826
- Time zone: UTC+3:30 (IRST)

Siyah Nab (Persian: سيه ناب) (Note: Also romanized as Sīyah Nāb; also known as Sīnāb (سين اب) and Sīnābād (سين اباد)) is a village in Mehranrud-e Markazi Rural District of the Central District in Bostanabad County, East Azerbaijan province, Iran.

== Demographics ==
=== Population ===
At the time of the 2006 National Census, the village's population was 843 in 184 households. The following census in 2011 counted 826 people in 200 households. The 2016 census measured the population of the village as 826 people in 223 households.
