= Anarjan =

Anarjan (Persian: انرجان) may refer to:

- Anarjan, Bostanabad
- Anarjan, Tabriz
