= Gori Lake =

Lake in Iran

Gori Lake Qurugöl
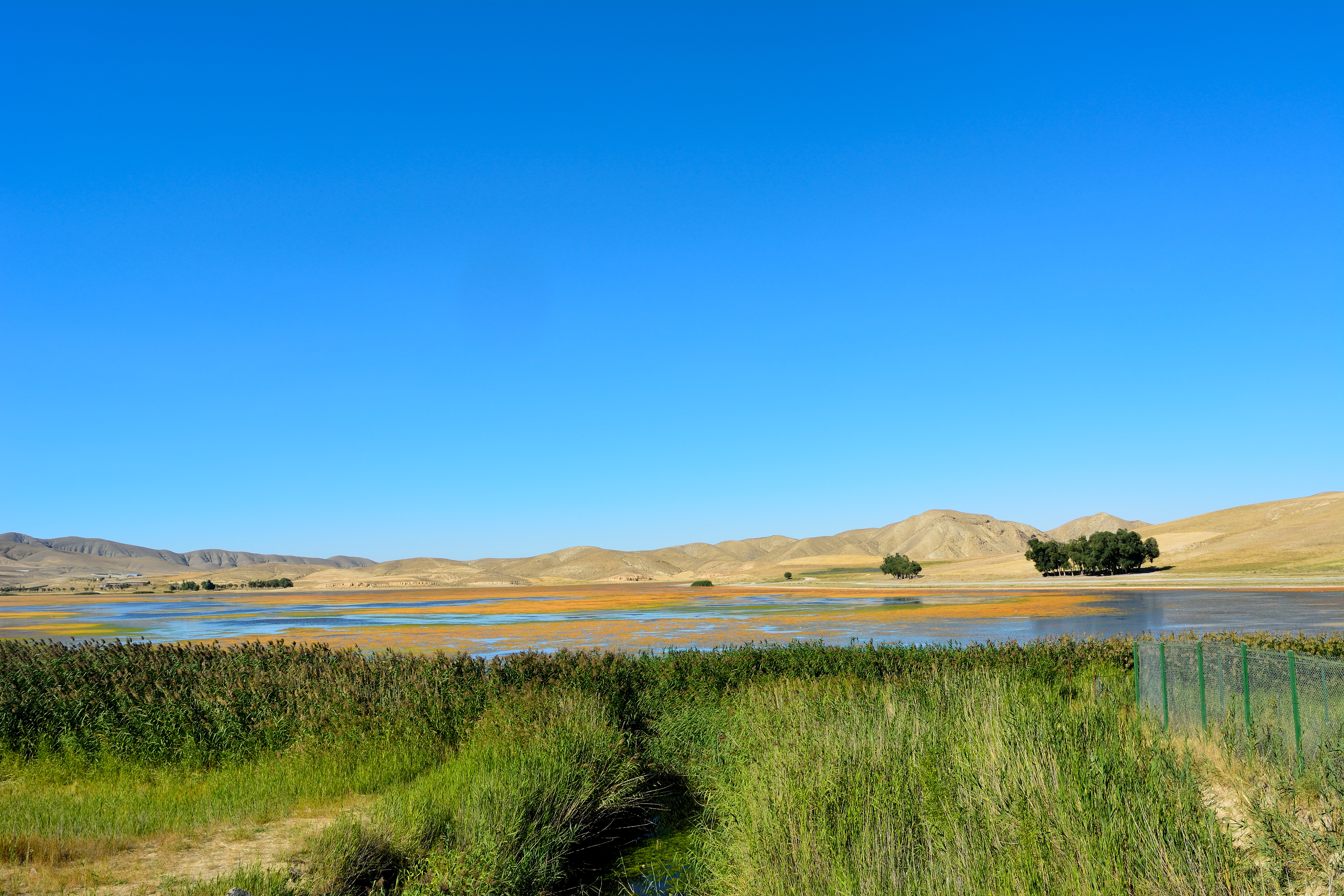
- Forest next to Gori Lake

- Location within Iran
- Interactive map of Gori Lake; Qurugöl
- Location: East Azarbaijan Province
- Coordinates: 37°54′57.9″N 46°42′03.8″E
- Basin countries: Iran

Ramsar Wetland
- Official name: Lake Gori
- Designated: 23 June 1975
- Reference no.: 48

Gori Lake (Qurugöl) is a small fresh to brackish lake in the uplands of East Azarbaijan Province in north-western Iran. Together with the adjacent reed marshes it is an important breeding area for waterfowl. A 1.2 km² site was designated as a Ramsar Convention wetland protection site on 23 June 1975.

== Geographical location ==
Guri Lake, with an area of 120 hectares, is located in East Azerbaijan at 37 degrees 55 minutes north and 046 degrees 42 minutes east. This lake, which has fresh water, is located on the edge of vast reed beds and at a high altitude. It is located at 30 km from Tabriz city, on the Tabriz-Tehran transit road and 18 km from Bostan Abad. The nearest villages to this lake are Yousef Abad and Amnab.

== Climate ==
The climate of this lake is dry and cold.

== Watershed ==
This lake is fed by springs, runoff, small streams and rainfall. However, the largest share of the water volume comes from spring snow melt. Additionally, six channels connect to the lake. One channel is 10 km long in the western part of the area. The slope of this channel is 7 to 8 percent with a high erosion rate on its sides. There are 2 other channels in the southwestern part of the lake, both 11 km long and joining near the lake. There are also 3 other channels in the southern part of the lake, each 9 km long. In the north of the lake, there are several small and short channels that direct flood flows to the north of the lake during rainfall. Due to the presence of temporary channels and underground backwaters, it is difficult to assess the water level. Currently, the water level is calculated to be 1.8 m, with a minimum depth of 1.8 m and a water volume of 2.9 million cubic meters, given the lake's area of 160 hectares.

== Gallery ==
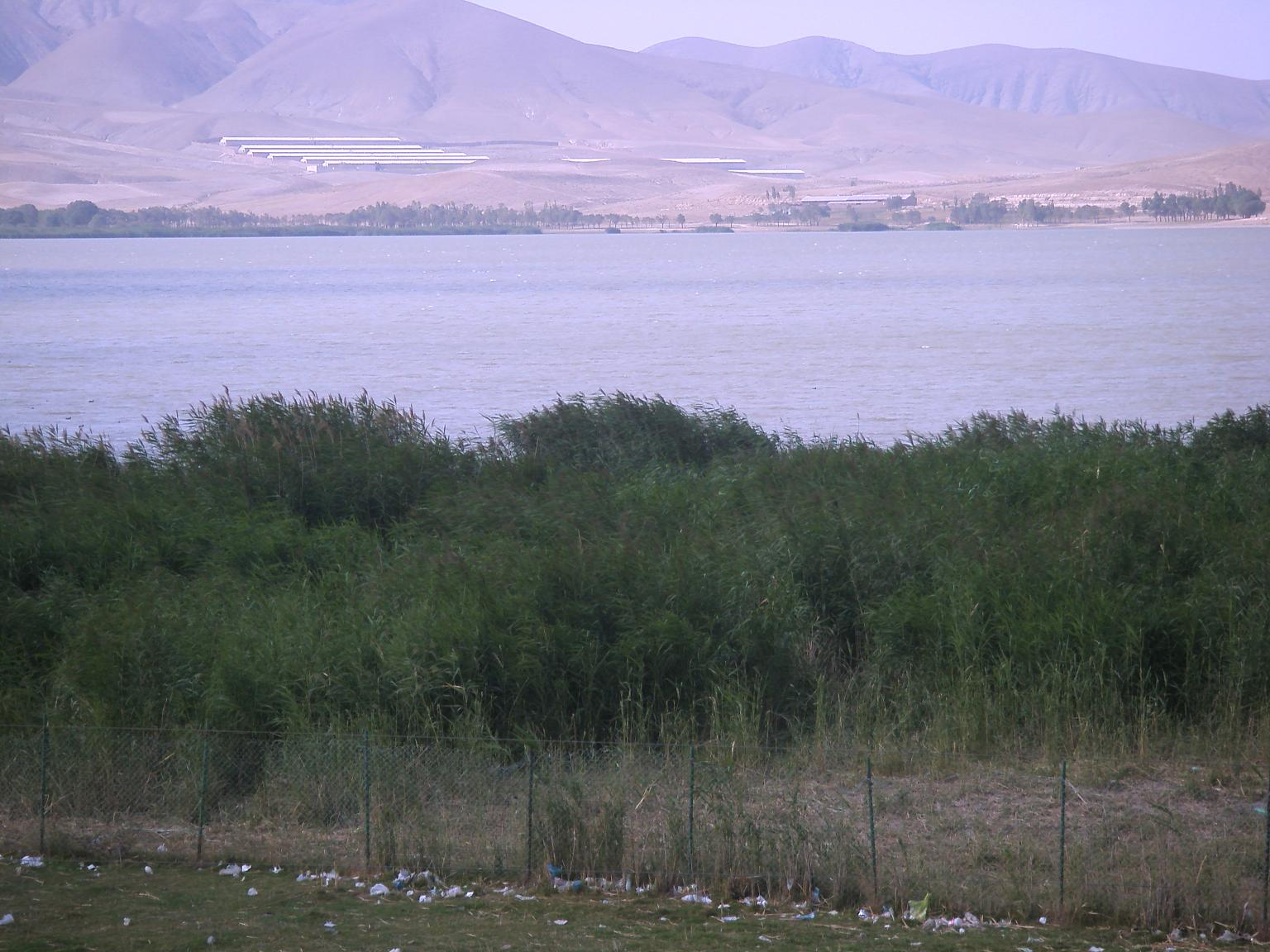
