= MIRAS =

MIRAS or Miras may refer to:

- Miras, village and administrative unit of the Devoll municipality, Korçë County, southeastern Albania
- Miras (TV channel), a state-owned channel in Turkmenistan
- Mortgage interest relief at source, tax relief for mortgages in the UK
- Microwave Imaging Radiometer with Aperture Synthesis
- Multi-Color Infrared Alerting Sensor, missile warning sensor for the Airbus A400M Atlas
- Multiple isomorphous replacement with Anomalous Signal, method to solve crystallographic structures of proteins
- Mir Infrared Spectrometer, science instrument on the Mir space station
- Domingo Miras, Spanish dramatist
- Fernando López Miras, Spanish politician
- Nacho Miras (born 1997), Spanish footballer
- Shah Miras, a village in Iran
