= Zirkan =

Zirkan or Zir Kan (Persian: زيركان or زيركن), (Ukrainian: зіркан or зірка н) is the name of two villages in Iran:

- Zirkan, East Azerbaijan (زيركان - Zīrkān)
- Zirkan, Razavi Khorasan (زيركن - Zīrkan)
