= Yusefabad, Bostanabad =

Village in East Azerbaijan province, Iran

Yusefabad Persian: يوسف اباد
- Village
- Location within Iran
- Coordinates: 37°55′23″N 46°40′23″E
- Country: Iran
- Province: East Azerbaijan
- County: Bostanabad
- District: Central
- Rural District: Qurigol

Population (2016)
  - Total: 74
- Time zone: UTC+3:30 (IRST)

Yusefabad (Persian: يوسف اباد) (Note: Also romanized as Yūsefābād) is a village in, and the capital of, Qurigol Rural District in the Central District of Bostanabad County, East Azerbaijan province, Iran.

== Demographics ==
=== Population ===
At the time of the 2006 National Census, the village's population was 233 in 52 households. The following census in 2011 counted 139 people in 41 households. The 2016 census measured the population of the village as 74 people in 28 households.
