= Zangebar =

Zangebar or Zangabar or Zangbar (Persian: زنگبار) may refer to:

- Zangebar, Ardabil
- Zangbar, East Azerbaijan
- Zangebar Rural District, in West Azerbaijan Province
