= Abriz =

Village in East Azerbaijan province, Iran

Abriz Persian: ابريز
- Village
- Location within Iran
- Coordinates: 37°53′34″N 46°52′49″E
- Country: Iran
- Province: East Azerbaijan
- County: Bostanabad
- District: Central
- Rural District: Mehranrud-e Markazi

Population (2016)
  - Total: 1,463
- Time zone: UTC+3:30 (IRST)

Abriz (Persian: ابريز) (Note: Also romanized as Ābrīz) is a village in Mehranrud-e Markazi Rural District of the Central District in Bostanabad County, East Azerbaijan province, Iran.

== Demographics ==
=== Population ===
At the time of the 2006 National Census, the village's population was 1,324 in 278 households. The following census in 2011 counted 1,386 people in 383 households. The 2016 census measured the population of the village as 1,463 people in 407 households.
