= USS Herald (1798) =

History

United States
- Name: Herald
- Namesake: A bearer of news
- Launched: 1797, Newburyport, Massachusetts
- Acquired: 15 June 1798
- Out of service: 1801
- Fate: Sold 1801

France
- Name: Africaine
- Acquired: 1801 by purchase
- Captured: 4 May 1804

United Kingdom
- Name: Africaine or African
- Acquired: 1805
- Captured: late 1807 or early 1808

General characteristics
- Type: Full-rigged ship
- Tons burthen: 267, or 279 (bm)
- Length: 92 ft 8 in (28.2 m)
- Beam: 26 ft 3 1/2 in (8.0 m)
- Depth: 13 ft 1 3/4 in (4.0 m)
- Complement: 140 (US Navy)
- Armament: US Navy: 16 × 6-pounder + 6 × 4-pounder guns; French privateer:20 guns; British service: 4 × 6-pounder guns + 2 × 18-pounder & 10 × 9-pounder guns ("Of the New Construction")

USS Herald was a full-rigged ship of about 270 tons burthen built in 1797 at Newburyport, Massachusetts. The US Navy purchased her on 15 June 1798, and sold her in 1801. She became the French 20-gun privateer corvette Africaine. In 1804 a British privateer seized her on 4 May 1804 off the coast, near Charleston, South Carolina. The seizure gave rise to a case in the U.S. courts that defined the limits of U.S. territorial waters. The U.S. courts ruled that the privateer had seized Africaine outside U.S. jurisdiction. Africaine then became a Liverpool-based slave ship that made two voyages carrying slaves from West Africa to the West Indies. After the abolition of the slave trade in 1807 she became a West Indiaman that two French privateers captured in late 1807 or early 1808.

== Merchantman ==
Herald was registered at Newburyport on 12 October 1797 with Edward Davis, owner and master.

The Philadelphia Inquirer reported on 8 May 1798 that on 3 May the excellent and fast sailing ship Herald of Boston, armed with 14 guns, Edward Davis, commander, had arrived Boston as a part of a large convoy in 45 days from London with freight and five passengers. Captain Davis, on coming into the harbour fired a salute of 14 guns. Her voyage had been eventful. She had joined a convoy in Portsmouth for Boston on 18 March sailing under the protection of HMS St Albans (54 guns), and a sloop of war. On the 19th Herald ran foul of Eliza and carried away her bowsprit, which obliged Herald to put into Falmouth.

The fleet proceeded to Cork and picked up HMS Cleopatra, which was waiting with other ships from Liverpool, Bristol, and Ireland. This first convoy of two, the second was scheduled for later in May, consisted of forty ships all armed except for two, Montezuma and Carlisle. The commodore of the convoy, Captain Pender on St Albans, intended going the southern passage, and to drop the ships along the coast. On the 28th, in longitude 15, in a fog, Herald lost the convoy; and on 30 March, was chased by a frigate, which brought her to, after running 15 hours to the eastward. The frigate proved to be HMS Cleopatra, Captain Pellew, who treated her politely, and informed Pender that Cleopatra had retaken William Penn, from Philadelphia, and also, a French privateer of 16 guns and 130 men. (Note: The privateer that Cleopatra had captured on 25 March was an en razée from Lorient named Émilie, mounting sixteen 6-pounder and two brass 12-pounder guns. Émilie had a crew of 110 men and had been out 39 days. The capture of William Penn, on 21 March, took place in company with HMS Nautilus, Arthur K. Legge.)

The next day, the 31st, Herald was again chased by a privateer brig that came near, but on seeing Herald's guns sheered off.

== US Navy ==
The Navy purchased Herald from Edward Davis on 15 June 1798.

Herald was made ready for sea in Boston as a sloop of war (20 guns), under the command of Captain Severs, and lay there for a period along with the brig USS Pickering (14 guns), Captain Chapman. The two ships sailed from Boston and then from Newport R.I. on 22 August 1798 onto Halifax as convoy for the brig Commerce, and while there exchanged gun salutes on paying a diplomatic visit to Fort George on Citadel Hill. She cruised in the West Indies during the Quasi-War with France from 1799 to 1800. Was at Boston October 1799. In August 1799, Lt. Charles C. Russell became her captain. On 21 January 1800, USS Augusta and Herald encountered and captured the 6-gun privateer schooner La Mutine off San Juan, Puerto Rico.

In August 1800, Herald, Augusta, and Trumbull were cruising near Aux Cayes. Both Augusta and Trumbull captured some French vessels, though there is no record that Herald had any such success.

After the treaty of peace with France had been ratified on 18 February 1801, Herald returned to the West Indies on 23 March to recall the US Naval Forces under the command of Silas Talbot.

On 18 April 1801, Herald rescued the crew of the wrecked Dutch ship Cunningham, of Belfast.

Navy Secretary Benjamin Stoddert expressed dissatisfaction with her abilities as early as June 1799 and express a desire to sell her. In a letter dated 17 July 1799, Secretary of the Navy stated that her gun deck was so low that in a good wind her guns were useless. In a letter dated 20 February to Josiah Parker, chairman of the Committee on Naval Affairs, Navy Secretary Stoddert again recommended selling her.

The U.S. Navy sold Herald at Boston in 1801 for $17,847.75 and new owners renamed her Africaine.

== French privateer ==
Captain Burnam of the schooner Betsey reported that on 24 April 1804, as Betsey was sailing from Charleston to Philadelphia, she had encountered a French ship named Africaine, Captain Duaberqueny, from Brest. Africaine fired a couple of shots at Betsey and ordered Burnam to come aboard Africaine. After some detention Duaberqueny politely permitted Burnam to proceed. Burnam further reported that when Africaine spoke him she was then bearing away for Charleston having lost her mizzenmast and thrown her guns overboard in a gale of wind.

The Maryland Gazette carried a report from Charleston, South Carolina, dated 3 May 1804, that the French corvette Africa, (late the Herald sloop of war) had sailed from Havana for Charleston 23 days earlier, with 350 French troops as passengers. A gale on 22 April before Africa's arrival at Charleston had cost her her mizzenmast. She also had had to throw overboard 12 or 14 guns. Sixteen of the passengers were lost at the same time. When Africa arrived off Charleston she took a pilot on board on Thursday evening, and anchored a short distance from Charleston Bar.

The next morning, 4 May 1804, the brig Garland from Nassau arrived and fired two guns. The corvette struck her colours as she had only four guns mounted. Garland, a British privateer brig, William Pinder (or Pender, or Pendar), master, of Nassau and New Providence, had earlier cleared from Charleston on 9 April. She seized Africaine on 4 May 1804 at Charleston, South Carolina. Africaine had on board 358 French troops that had escaped from St. Domingo and that she had embarked at Havana to carry back to France. The capture took place about 12 leagues from the Charleston Bar. Before Garland captured Africaine, Africaine had captured two British merchant vessels, Rosamond, of Glasgow, and the brig Chance, of Jamaica. (Note: Lloyd's List reported that a French privateer had captured Chance, Watt, master, off Charleston as Chance was sailing from Jamaica to Charleston. The same unnamed privateer had also taken Rosamond, from the Clyde. Rosamond, W.Connell, master, of 194 tons (bm), and two guns, had been launched at New York in 1771. Her trade was Greenock–Charleston.) Enterprize, which had sailed from Nassau in company with Garland, hove in sight soon after Africaine had struck (they had left Nassau some six days earlier). Enterprize assisted in removing the prisoners: 500 French troops embarked at Charleston on 10 May on board the American ship Chesapeake, Lee, for Bordeaux.

=== Court case ===
In SOULT V. L'AFRICAINE, the commercial agent of the French Republic at Charleston protested Garland's seizure of Africaine, arguing that the seizure had occurred on the Charleston bar and hence had occurred in the territorial waters of a neutral state. In early June the Court found in favour of Garland's owners. The Court defined the U.S. territorial waters as one league (4.8 km) from the low tide of the shore, not including shoals that are always underwater. In this instance the measurement taken was from the nearest land Sullivan's Island five or six miles away to Rattlesnake breaker one or two miles from the shoals where Africaine had been taken. Consequently, the seizure had taken place outside of U.S. territorial waters and was valid.

Garland, Enterprize, and their prize L'Africaine, arrived at Nassau on 1 July 1804.

== British slave ship and merchantman ==
Africaine was registered in Liverpool in 1805 and first appeared in Lloyd's Register (LR) in 1805 as African. LR described her as having been built in America in 1797 and being of 267 tons (bm).

1st slave voyage (1805–1806): Captain Christopher Brew sailed from Liverpool on 24 May 1805. Africaine acquired her slaves at Onim (current day Lagos), and sailed from Africa on 15 October. She arrived at Barbados on 29 December with 216 slaves. She sailed from Barbados on 8 February 1806, and arrived back at Liverpool on 15 April. At some point Captain John French had replaced Brew. Africaine had left Liverpool with 33 crew members and she suffered three crew deaths on the voyage.

2nd slave voyage (1806–1807): Captain Richard Vaughn sailed from Liverpool on 24 July 1806. Africaine arrived at Cape Coast Castle and started acquiring slaves on 19 September. She then gathered further slaves at Accra. She sailed from Africa on 14 December and arrived at Kingston, Jamaica on 25 February 1807 with 250 slaves. She left Kingston on 7 May and arrived back at Liverpool on 18 July.

The 1807 Act for the Abolition of the Slave Trade ended British participation in the Trans Atlantic Slave Trade. Her owners sold Africaine and new owners started sailing her as a West Indiaman. She also underwent repairs in 1807.

Year	Master	Owner	Trade	Source & notes
1807	R.Vaughn; Wood	M'Dowel; Dowick	Liverpool–Africa; London–San Domingo	LR; repairs 1807
1809	Wood	Dowrick	London–Domingo	LR; repairs 1806 & small repairs 1807

== Fate ==
Lloyd's List of 29 January 1808 reported that two French privateers had captured Africaine, after an action of two hours, and taken her into Cuba. Africaine had been sailing from London to Port-au-Prince.

LR for 1809 carried the annotation "capt" by her name. LR for 1810 no longer listed her.
