= Qareh Chaman =

Village in East Azerbaijan province, Iran

Qareh Chaman Persian: قره چمن
- Village
- Location within Iran
- Coordinates: 37°37′10″N 47°09′35″E
- Country: Iran
- Province: East Azerbaijan
- County: Bostanabad
- District: Tikmeh Dash
- Rural District: Abbas-e Sharqi

Population (2016)
  - Total: 186
- Time zone: UTC+3:30 (IRST)

Qareh Chaman (Persian: قره چمن) (Note: Also known as Seyāh Chaman, Sīāh Chaman, and Sīyāh Chaman) is a village in, and the capital of, Abbas-e Sharqi Rural District in Tikmeh Dash District of Bostanabad County, East Azerbaijan province, Iran.

== Demographics ==
=== Population ===
At the time of the 2006 National Census, the village's population was 431 in 123 households. The following census in 2011 counted 332 people in 115 households. The 2016 census measured the population of the village as 186 people in 77 households.
