= USS Augusta (1799) =

History

United States
- Name: Augusta
- Namesake: Augusta, Georgia
- Acquired: 30 June 1799
- Commissioned: Late 1799
- Fate: Sold 1801

General characteristics
- Complement: 100
- Armament: 10 × 6-pounders; 4 other guns

USS Augusta was a brig purchased by the US Navy on 30 June 1799 at Norfolk, Virginia. She mistakenly went to Trenton, New Jersey arriving on 13 September, she was then ordered to Marcus Hook, Pennsylvania for inspection by naval constructor Joshua Humphreys to see if the transport would be suitable for use as a warship. Capt. Bird was replaced by Lieutenant Archibald McElroy on the 13th. Humphreys approved and fitting out began in September. She was placed in commission for service in the Quasi-War with France sometime late in 1799.

In December, she put to sea in company with a convoy bound for the Caribbean and arrived in the West Indies by early 1800. She began cruising in search of French vessels operating there. On 21 January 1800, the brig and her consort, USSHerald, encountered and captured the 6-gun privateer schooner La Mutine off Puerto Rico. Later that spring, she cruised the coast of what is now Haiti operating against the French in conjunction with the forces under Toussaint Louverture.

June 1800 was her most active month. On the 3rd, she fell in with two French schooners, La Jeanne and La Victoire, off Jacmel. She captured both vessels and sent them into port to be adjudicated by a prize court. On 24 June, while cruising in company with the frigate USS Boston, Augusta joined her larger colleague in capturing L'Espoir and sent the prize into Boston, Massachusetts, for adjudication by an admiralty court.

Her last captures in the undeclared war with France came on 28 July 1800 near the town of Aux Cayes, Saint-Domingue. In cooperation with Toussaint L'Ouverture's schooner General Dessalines, Augusta sent boat crews into the bay to cut out two French brigs, the names of which are unknown. The expedition succeeded, and the two brigs were sent into port. On 15 August her boat captured an unidentified schooner. Thereafter, she continued to cruise West Indian waters in search of French vessels, but apparently made no further captures. She had returned to Norfolk by the time Lt. McElroy sent a 20 November dated letter to Secretary Stoddert. On 8 January 1801, Lt. William Peterkin assumed command from Lt. McElroy. In a letter dated 20 February 1801 to Josiah Parker, chairman of the Committee on Naval Affairs, Navy Secretary Stoddert recommended selling her. She was laid up at the Gosport Shipyard by mid-March 1801. She was sold later that year, probably sometime between 1 April and 30 June for $13,889.
