= Qeran Qayeh =

Village in East Azerbaijan province, Iran

Qeran Qayeh Persian: قران قية
- Village
- Location within Iran
- Coordinates: 37°38′15″N 47°02′02″E
- Country: Iran
- Province: East Azerbaijan
- County: Bostanabad
- District: Tikmeh Dash
- Rural District: Abbas-e Sharqi

Population (2016)
  - Total: 127
- Time zone: UTC+3:30 (IRST)

Qeran Qayeh (Persian: قران قية) is a village in Abbas-e Sharqi Rural District of Tikmeh Dash District in Bostanabad County, East Azerbaijan province, Iran.

== Demographics ==
=== Population ===
At the time of the 2006 National Census, the village's population was below the reporting threshold. The following census in 2011 counted 93 people in 46 households. The 2016 census measured the population of the village as 127 people in 44 households.
