= Shangolabad, Bostanabad =

Village in East Azerbaijan province, Iran

Shangolabad Persian: شنگل اباد
- Village
- Location within Iran
- Coordinates: 37°42′46″N 47°07′44″E
- Country: Iran
- Province: East Azerbaijan
- County: Bostanabad
- District: Tikmeh Dash
- Rural District: Abbas-e Sharqi

Population (2016)
  - Total: 316
- Time zone: UTC+3:30 (IRST)

Shangolabad (Persian: شنگل اباد) (Note: Also romanized as Shangolābād; also known as Shangūlābād and Shankalābād) is a village in Abbas-e Sharqi Rural District of Tikmeh Dash District in Bostanabad County, East Azerbaijan province, Iran.

== Demographics ==
=== Population ===
At the time of the 2006 National Census, the village's population was 393 in 81 households. The following census in 2011 counted 248 people in 75 households. The 2016 census measured the population of the village as 316 people in 99 households. It was the most populous village in its rural district.
