= Kürçülü =

- Municipality
- Location within Azerbaijan
- Coordinates: 39°32′N 44°55′E
- Country: Azerbaijan
- Autonomous republic: Nakhchivan
- District: Sharur

Population (2005)
  - Total: 865
- Time zone: UTC+4 (AZT)

Kürçülü (also, Kurchulu, Kyurchyulyu; until 2003, Kürd Çullu, Kyurd Chullu and Kyurtchulu) is a village and municipality in the Sharur District of Nakhchivan Autonomous Republic, Azerbaijan. It is located in the 1 km away from the international railway of Azerbaijan, 5 km in the south-west from the district center, on the Sharur plain. Its population is busy with grain-growing, vegetable-growing, farming and animal husbandry. There are secondary school, library, club and a medical center in the village. It has a population of 865.

== Etymology ==
The former name of the village was the Çullu (Chullu). To distinguish settlement from the other same named villages (Aghdam, Jabrail regions, Southern Azerbaijan) it took Kürd component from the name of the nearby Kürdkənd village and became Kürd Çullu, means "the Çullu village near the Kürdkənd". Since 2003, the name of the village was officially registered as Kürçülü. According to researchers, the correct version of the name is Çollu and the name reflects on itself, the name of çol tribe of the Huns.
