= Sinabad, West Azerbaijan =

Sinabad سين اباد
- Village
- Location within Iran
- Coordinates: 37°49′11″N 44°35′45″E
- Country: Iran
- Province: West Azerbaijan
- County: Urmia
- Bakhsh: Sumay-ye Beradust
- Rural District: Sumay-ye Jonubi

Population (2006)
  - Total: 459
- Time zone: UTC+3:30 (IRST)
  - Summer (DST): UTC+4:30 (IRDT)

Sinabad (Persian: سين اباد, also Romanized as Sīnābād; in Armenian: Սինաւա) is a village in Sumay-ye Jonubi Rural District, Sumay-ye Beradust District, Urmia County, West Azerbaijan Province, Iran. At the 2006 census, its population was 459, in 66 families.
