= Jughan, Rudbar-e Jonubi =

Jughan جوغن
- Village
- Location within Iran
- Coordinates: 28°03′56″N 58°34′59″E
- Country: Iran
- Province: Kerman
- County: Rudbar-e Jonubi
- Bakhsh: Jazmurian
- Rural District: Kuhestan

Population (2006)
  - Total: 81
- Time zone: UTC+3:30 (IRST)
  - Summer (DST): UTC+4:30 (IRDT)

Jughan (Persian: جوغن, also Romanized as Jūghan; also known as Jūqan) is a village in Kuhestan Rural District, Jazmurian District, Rudbar-e Jonubi County, Kerman Province, Iran. At the 2006 census, its population was 81, in 17 families.
