= Qorçulu =

- Municipality
- Location within Azerbaijan
- Coordinates: 39°34′N 44°57′E
- Country: Azerbaijan
- Autonomous republic: Nakhchivan
- District: Sharur

Population (2005)
  - Total: 100
- Time zone: UTC+4 (AZT)

Qorçulu (also, Gorchulu and Korchulu) is a village and municipality in the Sharur District of Nakhchivan Azerbaijan It is located 5 km away from the district center, on the Sharur plain. Its population is busy with grain-growing, vegetable-growing and animal husbandry. There are secondary school, and a medical center in the village. It has a population of 100

== Etymology ==
The settlement was built in the past by the families from the Qorçu (Gorchu) village of Lachin region. The geographical name was made out from the word of Qorçu and the suffix of -lu in the meaning of (belonging) means "people who came from the Qorçu village". The name of Qorçu means "protector". In the 14th-18th centuries, in the Azerbaijan the warrior of special security forces, the Guard of the Palace, was called the Qorçu. They used to be wore distinguishing uniform. Qorcular (Gorchus) have carried various positions in the Safavid period.
