= Quzlujeh, Maragheh =

Quzlujeh قوزلوجه
- Village
- Location within Iran
- Coordinates: 37°25′08″N 46°20′52″E
- Country: Iran
- Province: East Azerbaijan
- County: Maragheh
- Bakhsh: Central
- Rural District: Sarajuy-ye Gharbi

Population (2006)
  - Total: 544
- Time zone: UTC+3:30 (IRST)
  - Summer (DST): UTC+4:30 (IRDT)

Quzlujeh (Persian: قوزلوجه, also Romanized as Qūzlūjeh) is a village in Sarajuy-ye Gharbi Rural District, in the Central District of Maragheh County, East Azerbaijan Province, Iran. At the 2006 census, its population was 544, in 106 families.
