= Kord Kandi, Bostanabad =

City in East Azerbaijan province, Iran

Kord Kandi Persian: کردکندی
- City
- Location within Iran
- Coordinates: 37°57′23″N 46°57′22″E
- Country: Iran
- Province: East Azerbaijan
- County: Bostanabad
- District: Central
- Established as a city: 2021

Population (2016)
  - Total: 4,439
- Time zone: UTC+3:30 (IRST)

Kord Kandi (Persian: کردکندی) (Note: Also romanized as Kord Kandī; also known as Khūrdi Kandi and Kurdkand) is a city in the Central District of Bostanabad County, East Azerbaijan province, Iran. As a village it was the capital of Mehranrud-e Markazi Rural District until its capital was transferred to the village of Nowjeh Deh-e Sadat.

== Demographics ==
=== Population ===
At the time of the 2006 National Census, Kord Kandi's population was 4,253 in 798 households, when it was a village in Mehranrud-e Markazi Rural District. The following census in 2011 counted 4,321 people in 1,138 households. The 2016 census measured the population of the village as 4,439 people in 1,253 households. It was the most populous village in its rural district.

Kord Kandi was converted to a city in 2021.
