= Quzlujeh, Shahin Dezh =

Quzlujeh قوزلوجه
- Village
- Location within Iran
- Coordinates: 36°37′21″N 46°40′35″E
- Country: Iran
- Province: West Azerbaijan
- County: Shahin Dezh
- Bakhsh: Central
- Rural District: Hulasu

Population (2006)
  - Total: 90
- Time zone: UTC+3:30 (IRST)
  - Summer (DST): UTC+4:30 (IRDT)

Quzlujeh (Persian: قوزلوجه, also Romanized as Qūzlūjeh) is a village in Hulasu Rural District, in the Central District of Shahin Dezh County, West Azerbaijan Province, Iran. At the 2006 census, its population was 90, in 16 families.
