= Alvandi, Qazvin =

Alvandi الوندي
- Village
- Location within Iran
- Coordinates: 36°27′44″N 49°31′03″E
- Country: Iran
- Province: Qazvin
- County: Qazvin
- Bakhsh: Kuhin
- Rural District: Ilat-e Qaqazan-e Gharbi

Population (2006)
  - Total: 70
- Time zone: UTC+3:30 (IRST)
  - Summer (DST): UTC+4:30 (IRDT)

Alvandi (Persian: الوندي, also Romanized as Alvandī) is a village in Ilat-e Qaqazan-e Gharbi Rural District, Kuhin District, Qazvin County, Qazvin Province, Iran. At the 2006 census, its population was 70, in 16 families.
