= Kurkend, Neftchala =

Kurkend is a village and municipality in the Neftchala Rayon of Azerbaijan. It has a population of 1,749.

Until 15 May 2003 name of the village was Novovasilyevka. After parliament resolution of the mentioned date it was named as Kürkənd (Kurkend).
