= Anbardan, Charuymaq =

Anbardan انباردان
- Village
- Location within Iran
- Coordinates: 37°04′35″N 47°10′18″E
- Country: Iran
- Province: East Azerbaijan
- County: Charuymaq
- Bakhsh: Shadian
- Rural District: Charuymaq-e Jonubesharqi

Population (2006)
  - Total: 20
- Time zone: UTC+3:30 (IRST)
  - Summer (DST): UTC+4:30 (IRDT)

Anbardan (Persian: انباردان, also Romanized as Anbārdān) is a village in Charuymaq-e Jonubesharqi Rural District, Shadian District, Charuymaq County, East Azerbaijan Province, Iran. At the 2006 census, its population was 20, in 6 families.
