= Bostanabad =

City in East Azerbaijan province, Iran

Bostanabad بستان آباد (Persian) اوجان (South Azerbaijani)
- City
- Location within Iran
- Coordinates: 37°50′18″N 46°50′02″E
- Country: Iran
- Province: East Azerbaijan
- County: Bostanabad
- District: Central

Population (2016)
  - Total: 21,734
- Time zone: UTC+3:30 (IRST)

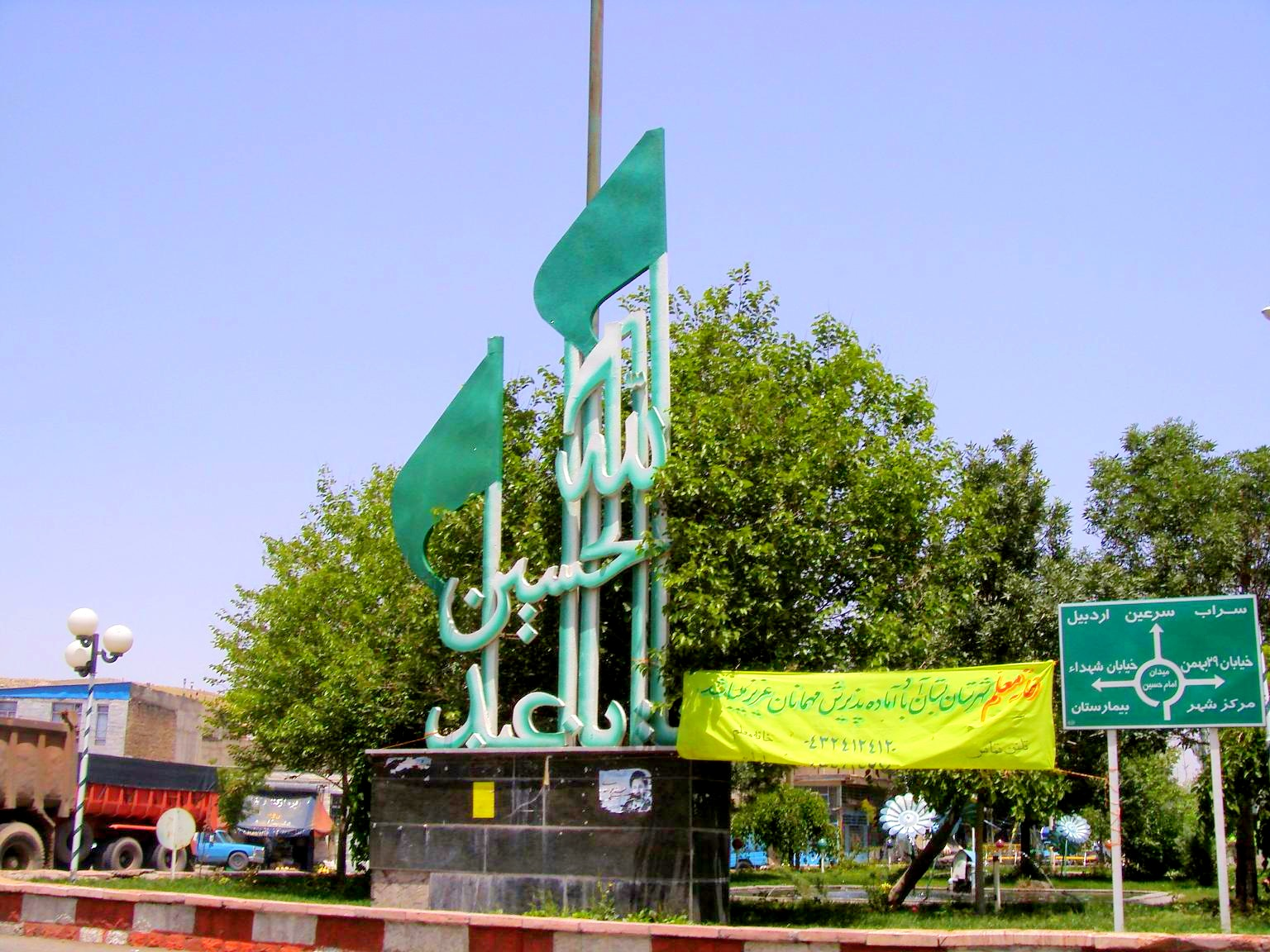
A square in Bostanabad city

Bostanabad (Persian: بستان آباد; (Note: Also romanized as Bostānābād) South Azerbaijani: اوجان, romanized: Ojan or Ucan) is a city in the Central District of Bostanabad County, East Azerbaijan province, Iran, serving as capital of both the county and the district.

== Demographics ==
=== Population ===
At the time of the 2006 National Census, the city's population was 16,592 in 3,937 households. The following census in 2011 counted 17,954 people in 4,940 households. The 2016 census measured the population of the city as 21,734 people in 6,318 households.
