= Qeran, Kurdistan =

Qeran قران
- Village
- Location within Iran
- Coordinates: 35°03′49″N 46°56′09″E
- Country: Iran
- Province: Kurdistan
- County: Sanandaj
- Bakhsh: Central
- Rural District: Naran

Population (2006)
  - Total: 45
- Time zone: UTC+3:30 (IRST)
  - Summer (DST): UTC+4:30 (IRDT)

Qeran (Persian: قران, also Romanized as Qerān, Qarān, and Qerrān) is a village in Naran Rural District, in the Central District of Sanandaj County, Kurdistan Province, Iran. At the 2006 census, its population was 45, in 11 families. The village is populated by Kurds.
