= Shebli Rural District =

Rural district in East Azerbaijan province, Iran

Shebli Rural District Persian: دهستان شبلي
- Rural District
- Location within Iran
- Coordinates: 37°52′N 46°32′E
- Country: Iran
- Province: East Azerbaijan
- County: Bostanabad
- District: Central
- Established: 1987
- Capital: Saidabad

Population (2016)
  - Total: 7,346
- Time zone: UTC+3:30 (IRST)

Shebli Rural District (Persian: دهستان شبلي) is in the Central District of Bostanabad County, East Azerbaijan province, Iran. Its capital is the village of Saidabad.

== Demographics ==
=== Population ===
At the time of the 2006 National Census, the rural district's population was 7,674 in 1,955 households. There were 7,530 inhabitants in 2,109 households at the following census of 2011. The 2016 census measured the population of the rural district as 7,346 in 2,133 households. The most populous of its eight villages was Saidabad, with 3,054 people.

=== Other villages in the rural district ===
- Iranaq
- Matanaq
- Qezelejah Meydan
