= Kürkənd, Nakhchivan =

Kürkənd
- Municipality
- Location within Azerbaijan
- Coordinates: 39°34′N 44°58′E
- Country: Azerbaijan
- Autonomous republic: Nakhchivan
- District: Sharur

Population (2005)
  - Total: 876
- Time zone: UTC+4 (AZT)

Kürkənd (also, Kyurkend, Kurkend; until 2003, Kürdkənd, Kyurdkend, and Kyurtkend) is a village and municipality in the Sharur District of Nakhchivan Autonomous Republic, Azerbaijan. It is located in the 1 km away from the international railway of Azerbaijan, 3 km in the south-west from the district center, on the Sharur plain. Its population is busy with grain-growing, vegetable-growing and animal husbandry. There are secondary school, library and a medical center in the village. It has a population of 876.

== Etymology ==
The name of the village was made out from component of the words of kürd (ethnonym) and kənd (village), means "the village of Kurds". It was registered in Kürtkənd version in 1933. Since 2003, the name of the village was officially registered as Kürkənd.
