= Abbas-e Sharqi Rural District =

Rural district in East Azerbaijan province, Iran

Abbas-e Sharqi Rural District Persian: دهستان عباس شرقي
- Rural District
- Location within Iran
- Coordinates: 37°40′N 47°08′E
- Country: Iran
- Province: East Azerbaijan
- County: Bostanabad
- District: Tikmeh Dash
- Established: 1987
- Capital: Qareh Chaman

Population (2016)
  - Total: 1,798
- Time zone: UTC+3:30 (IRST)

Abbas-e Sharqi Rural District (Persian: دهستان عباس شرقي) is in Tikmeh Dash District of Bostanabad County, East Azerbaijan province, Iran. Its capital is the village of Qareh Chaman.

== Demographics ==
=== Population ===
At the time of the 2006 National Census, the rural district's population was 3,056 in 770 households. There were 2,197 inhabitants in 727 households at the following census of 2011. The 2016 census measured the population of the rural district as 1,798 in 697 households. The most populous of its 26 villages was Shangolabad, with 316 people.

=== Other villages in the rural district ===
- Golehin
- Qeran Qayeh
- Zarrin Qaba
