= Qurigol Rural District =

Rural district in East Azerbaijan province, Iran

Qurigol Rural District Persian: دهستان قوريگل
- Rural District
- Location within Iran
- Coordinates: 37°54′N 46°41′E
- Country: Iran
- Province: East Azerbaijan
- County: Bostanabad
- District: Central
- Established: 1987
- Capital: Yusefabad

Population (2016)
  - Total: 9,814
- Time zone: UTC+3:30 (IRST)

Qurigol Rural District (Persian: دهستان قوريگل) is in the Central District of Bostanabad County, East Azerbaijan province, Iran. Its capital is the village of Yusefabad.

== Demographics ==
=== Population ===
At the time of the 2006 National Census, the rural district's population was 10,903 in 2,593 households. There were 10,520 inhabitants in 2,933 households at the following census of 2011. The 2016 census measured the population of the rural district as 9,814 in 2,926 households. The most populous of its 17 villages was Alanaq, with 3,646 people.

=== Other villages in the rural district ===
- Aliabad
- Kor
- Nujeh Deh-e Kuh
- Torkeh Dari
