= Mehranrud-e Jonubi Rural District =

Rural district in East Azerbaijan province, Iran

Mehranrud-e Jonubi Rural District Persian: دهستان مهرانرود جنوبي
- Rural District
- Location within Iran
- Coordinates: 37°49′N 46°42′E
- Country: Iran
- Province: East Azerbaijan
- County: Bostanabad
- District: Central
- Established: 1987
- Capital: Hajj Aqa

Population (2016)
  - Total: 6,084
- Time zone: UTC+3:30 (IRST)

Mehranrud-e Jonubi Rural District (Persian: دهستان مهرانرود جنوبي) is in the Central District of Bostanabad County, East Azerbaijan province, Iran. Its capital is the village of Hajj Aqa. The previous capital of the rural district was the village of Kargan-e Qadim.

== Demographics ==
=== Population ===
At the time of the 2006 National Census, the rural district's population was 4,661 in 1,030 households. There were 6,172 inhabitants in 1,620 households at the following census of 2011. The 2016 census measured the population of the rural district as 6,084 in 1,754 households. The most populous of its 13 villages was Kargan-e Qadim, with 2,742 people.

=== Other villages in the rural district ===
- Akinabad
- Helan
- Saran
