= Mehranrud-e Markazi Rural District =

Rural district in East Azerbaijan province, Iran

Mehranrud-e Markazi Rural District Persian: دهستان مهرانرود مرکزي
- Rural District
- Location within Iran
- Coordinates: 37°57′N 46°55′E
- Country: Iran
- Province: East Azerbaijan
- County: Bostanabad
- District: Central
- Established: 1987
- Capital: Nowjeh Deh-e Sadat

Population (2016)
  - Total: 18,380
- Time zone: UTC+3:30 (IRST)

Mehranrud-e Markazi Rural District (Persian: دهستان مهرانرود مرکزي) is in the Central District of Bostanabad County, East Azerbaijan province, Iran. Its capital is the village of Nowjeh Deh-e Sadat. The previous capital of the rural district was the village of Kord Kandi, now a city.

== Demographics ==
=== Population ===
At the time of the 2006 National Census, the rural district's population was 19,216 in 3,856 households. There were 18,822 inhabitants in 4,836 households at the following census of 2011. The 2016 census measured the population of the rural district as 18,380 in 5,242 households. The most populous of its 21 villages was Kord Kandi (now a city), with 4,439 people.

=== Other villages in the rural district ===
- Abriz
- Anbar Dan
- Oshdalaq-e Olya
- Seqin Saray
- Siyah Nab
- Turaqiyeh
