= Ujan-e Gharbi Rural District =

Rural district in East Azerbaijan province, Iran

Ujan-e Gharbi Rural District Persian: دهستان اوجان غربي
- Rural District
- Location within Iran
- Coordinates: 37°45′N 46°44′E
- Country: Iran
- Province: East Azerbaijan
- County: Bostanabad
- District: Central
- Established: 1987
- Capital: Beneh Kohol

Population (2016)
  - Total: 8,865
- Time zone: UTC+3:30 (IRST)

Ujan-e Gharbi Rural District (Persian: دهستان اوجان غربي) is in the Central District of Bostanabad County, East Azerbaijan province, Iran. Its capital is the village of Beneh Kohol.

== Demographics ==
=== Population ===
At the time of the 2006 National Census, the rural district's population was 10,458 in 1,940 households. There were 9,621 inhabitants in 2,421 households at the following census of 2011. The 2016 census measured the population of the rural district as 8,865 in 2,491 households. The most populous of its 26 villages was Charzeh Khun, with 1,679 people.

=== Other villages in the rural district ===
- Gol Akhar
- Juqan-e Bozorg
- Juqan-e Kuchak
- Kheyrabad
- Qarah Kowshan
