= Central District (Bostanabad County) =

District in East Azerbaijan province, Iran

Central District (Bostanabad County) Persian: بخش مرکزی شهرستان بستان‌آباد
- District
- Location within Iran
- Coordinates: 37°52′N 46°46′E
- Country: Iran
- Province: East Azerbaijan
- County: Bostanabad
- Capital: Bostanabad

Population (2016)
  - Total: 72,223
- Time zone: UTC+3:30 (IRST)

The Central District of Bostanabad County (Persian: بخش مرکزی شهرستان نمین) is in East Azerbaijan province, Iran. Its capital is the city of Bostanabad.

== History ==
The village of Kord Kandi was converted to a city in 2021.

== Demographics ==
=== Population ===
At the time of the 2006 National Census, the district's population was 69,504 in 15,311 households. The following census in 2011 counted 70,619 people in 18,859 households. The 2016 census measured the population of the district as 72,223 inhabitants living in 20,864 households.

=== Administrative divisions ===
Central District (Bostanabad County) Population
Administrative Divisions	2006	2011	2016
Mehranrud-e Jonubi RD	4,661	6,172	6,084
Mehranrud-e Markazi RD	19,216	18,822	18,380
Qurigol RD	10,903	10,520	9,814
Shebli RD	7,674	7,530	7,346
Ujan-e Gharbi RD	10,458	9,621	8,865
Bostanabad (city)	16,592	17,954	21,734
Kord Kandi (city) (Note: Became a city after the 2016 census)			
Total	69,504	70,619	72,223
RD = Rural District
