= Bostanabad County =

County in East Azerbaijan province, Iran

Bostanabad County Persian: شهرستان بستان‌آباد
- County
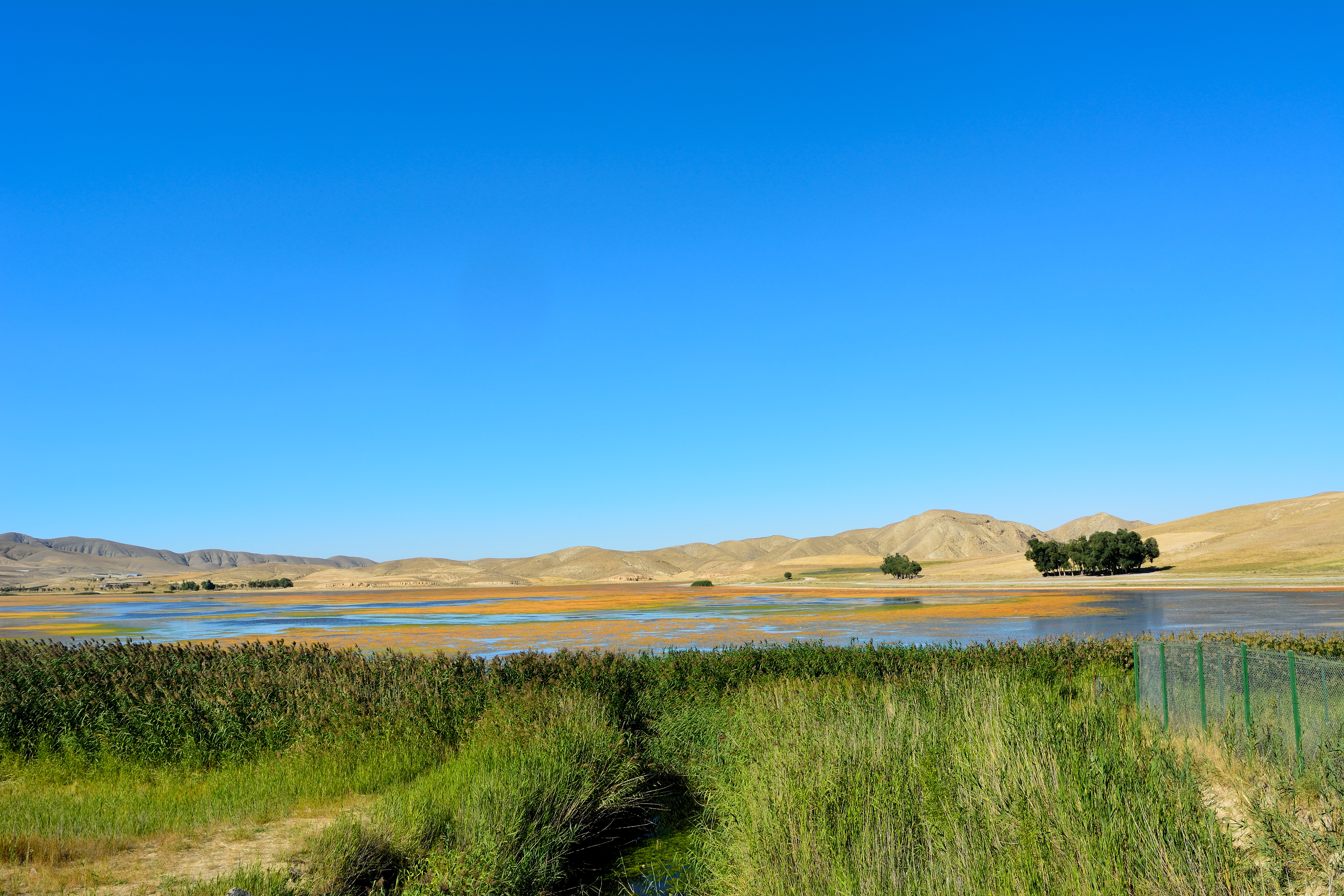
- Forest next to Gori Lake

- Location of Bostanabad County in East Azerbaijan province (center, pink)

- Location of East Azerbaijan province in Iran
- Coordinates: 37°49′N 46°52′E
- Country: Iran
- Province: East Azerbaijan
- Capital: Bostanabad
- Districts: Central, Tikmeh Dash

Population (2016)
  - Total: 94,769
- Time zone: UTC+3:30 (IRST)

Bostanabad County (Persian: شهرستان بستان‌آباد) is in East Azerbaijan province, Iran. The capital of the county is the city of Bostanabad.

== History ==
The village of Kord Kandi was converted to a city in 2021.

== Demographics ==
=== Population ===
At the time of the 2006 National Census, the county's population was 96,555 in 21,225 households. The following census in 2011 counted 94,985 people in 25,543 households. The 2016 census measured the population of the county as 94,769 in 27,647 households.

=== Administrative divisions ===
Bostanabad County's population history and administrative structure over three consecutive censuses are shown in the following table.

Bostanabad County Population
Administrative Divisions	2006	2011	2016
Central District	69,504	70,619	72,223
Mehranrud-e Jonubi RD	4,661	6,172	6,084
Mehranrud-e Markazi RD	19,216	18,822	18,380
Qurigol RD	10,903	10,520	9,814
Shebli RD	7,674	7,530	7,346
Ujan-e Gharbi RD	10,458	9,621	8,865
Bostanabad (city)	16,592	17,954	21,734
Kord Kandi (city) (Note: Became a city after the 2016 census)			
Tikmeh Dash District	27,051	24,366	22,545
Abbas-e Gharbi RD	10,070	8,451	7,243
Abbas-e Sharqi RD	3,056	2,197	1,798
Sahandabad RD	2,862	2,760	2,101
Ujan-e Sharqi RD	8,595	8,313	8,429
Tekmeh Dash (city)	2,468	2,645	2,974
Total	96,555	94,985	94,769
RD = Rural District

== Geography ==
The town of Bostanabad in Bostanabad County, located 55 kilometers from Tabriz, populated by Azerbaijanis, was built on the site of the old city of Ojan whose name has been mentioned in many history books since the sixth century AH. Ojan was the summer capital of the Moghuls, and was completely destroyed later on due to various events.

Quru Göl Lake, a leisure place in East Azerbaijan Province, is one of the natural shelters for many migrant birds.

Warm Water Spring is located near the main road between Tabriz and Tehran.

Aq Bolaq Cave is located in the southern part of the county towards Qareh Chaman.

== See also ==
Media related to Bostanabad County at Wikimedia Commons
