= Shahnavaz =

Shahnavaz (Persian: شهنواز) may refer to:

- Shahnavaz-e Olya
- Shahnavaz-e Sofla
- Shahnavaz-e Vosta
