= Shahnavaz-e Olya =

Shahnavaz-e Olya شهنوازعليا
- Village
- Location within Iran
- Coordinates: 37°07′02″N 46°45′08″E
- Country: Iran
- Province: East Azerbaijan
- County: Charuymaq
- Bakhsh: Central
- Rural District: Quri Chay-ye Sharqi

Population (2006)
  - Total: 149
- Time zone: UTC+3:30 (IRST)
  - Summer (DST): UTC+4:30 (IRDT)

Shahnavaz-e Olya (Persian: شهنوازعليا, also Romanized as Shahnavāz-e ‘Olyā; also known as Shahnavāz) is a village in Quri Chay-ye Sharqi Rural District, in the Central District of Charuymaq County, East Azerbaijan Province, Iran. At the 2006 census, its population was 149, in 31 families.
