= Shahnavaz-e Sofla =

Shahnavaz-e Sofla شهنوازسفلي
- Village
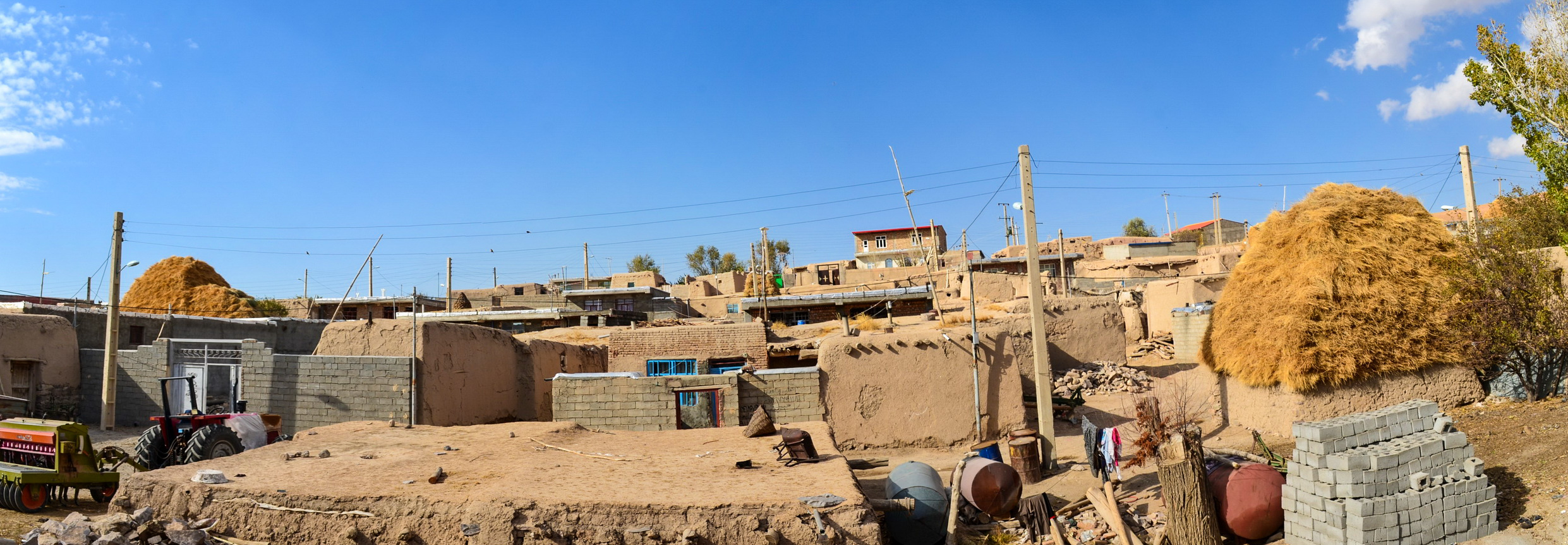

- Location within Iran
- Coordinates: 37°07′22″N 46°43′20″E
- Country: Iran
- Province: East Azerbaijan
- County: Charuymaq
- Bakhsh: Central
- Rural District: Quri Chay-ye Sharqi

Population (2006)
  - Total: 129
- Time zone: UTC+3:30 (IRST)
  - Summer (DST): UTC+4:30 (IRDT)

Shahnavaz-e Sofla (Persian: شهنوازسفلي, also Romanized as Shahnavāz-e Soflá) is a village in Quri Chay-ye Sharqi Rural District, in the Central District of Charuymaq County, East Azerbaijan Province, Iran. At the 2006 census, its population was 129, in 30 families.
