= Makhubele =

Makhubele is a surname. Notable people with the surname include:

- Colleen Makhubele (fl. from 2025), South African politician
- Ponani Makhubele-Marilele (born 1979 or 1980), South African politician

== See also ==
- Makhuleh
