= Makhuleh =

Makhuleh ماخوله
- Village
- Location within Iran
- Coordinates: 37°00′31″N 47°02′05″E
- Country: Iran
- Province: East Azerbaijan
- County: Charuymaq
- Bakhsh: Central
- Rural District: Charuymaq-e Jonubegharbi

Population (2006)
  - Total: 68
- Time zone: UTC+3:30 (IRST)
  - Summer (DST): UTC+4:30 (IRDT)

Makhuleh (Persian: ماخوله, also Romanized as Mākhūleh; also known as Mākhūleh-ye Bālā and Mākhūleh-ye ‘Olyā) is a village in Charuymaq-e Jonubegharbi Rural District, in the Central District of Charuymaq County, East Azerbaijan Province, Iran. At the 2006 census, its population was 68, in 12 families.
