= Idahlu =

Idahlu or Idehlu or Idehloo or Eydehlu (Persian: ايده لو), also rendered as Idalu or Idelu or Eydlu, may refer to various places in Iran:

- Idahlu, Charuymaq, East Azerbaijan Province
- Idahlu, Khoda Afarin, East Azerbaijan Province
- Eydlu, East Azerbaijan Province
- Idehlu, Sarab, East Azerbaijan Province
- Idahlu-ye Bozorg, East Azerbaijan Province
- Idahlu-ye Khalifeh, East Azerbaijan Province
- Idahlu-ye Kuchek, East Azerbaijan Province
- Idahlu-ye Khan, East Azerbaijan Province
- Idahlu, Hamadan
- Idahlu, Kabudarahang, Hamadan Province
- Idahlu, Kurdistan
- Idahlu, Mahneshan, Zanjan Province

== See also ==
- Ideluy (disambiguation), various places in Iran
- Eydlu, East Azerbaijan Province, Iran
