= Khaneh-ye Barq =

Khaneh-ye Barq (Persian: خانه برق) may refer to:

- Khaneh-ye Barq-e Isa Khani
- Khaneh-ye Barq-e Jadid
- Khaneh-ye Barq-e Qadim
- Qeshlaq-e Khaneh-ye Barq
- Yengikand-e Khaneh-ye Barq
