= Dush =

Dush may refer to:

- Dush, Albania, a villages in Shkodër County, Albania
- Dush, Egypt, a villages at Kharga Oasis in Egypt's western desert
- Dush, Iran, a villages in East Azerbaijan Province, Iran
- Dush, Hashtrud, a villages in East Azerbaijan Province, Iran
- Dush-e Mian (Middle Dush), a village in Kermanshah Province, Iran
- Dush (crater), a crater on Mars, see List of craters on Mars
- Dush, cat belonging to Cath Hunter in American-British sitcom Laff Riot
