= Qerkh Seqer =

Qerkh Seqer قرخ سقر
- Village
- Location within Iran
- Coordinates: 37°17′20″N 46°53′18″E
- Country: Iran
- Province: East Azerbaijan
- County: Hashtrud
- Bakhsh: Nazarkahrizi
- Rural District: Nazarkahrizi

Area
  - Total: 20 km^{2} (7.7 sq mi)

Population (2006)
  - Total: 354
  - Density: 18/km^{2} (46/sq mi)
- Time zone: UTC+3:30 (IRST)
  - Summer (DST): UTC+4:30 (IRDT)

Qerkh Seqer (Persian: قرخ سقر) is a village in Nazarkahrizi Rural District, Nazarkahrizi District, Hashtrud County, East Azerbaijan Province, Iran. At the 2006 census, its population was 354, in 81 families.
