= Bash Khalaj =

Bash Khalaj باش خلج
- Village
- Location within Iran
- Coordinates: 37°23′56″N 46°47′00″E
- Country: Iran
- Province: East Azerbaijan
- County: Hashtrud
- Bakhsh: Nazarkahrizi
- Rural District: Nazarkahrizi

Population (2006)
  - Total: 135
- Time zone: UTC+3:30 (IRST)
  - Summer (DST): UTC+4:30 (IRDT)

Bash Khalaj (Persian: باش خلج, also Romanized as Bāsh Khalaj; also known as Bāsh Khalīj) is a village in Nazarkahrizi Rural District, Nazarkahrizi District, Hashtrud County, East Azerbaijan Province, Iran. At the 2006 census, its population was 135, in 26 families.
