= Yanuq =

Yanuq يانوق
- Village
- Location within Iran
- Coordinates: 37°22′36″N 46°53′41″E
- Country: Iran
- Province: East Azerbaijan
- County: Hashtrud
- Bakhsh: Nazarkahrizi
- Rural District: Nazarkahrizi

Population (2006)
  - Total: 452
- Time zone: UTC+3:30 (IRST)
  - Summer (DST): UTC+4:30 (IRDT)

Yanuq (Persian: يانوق, romanized: Yānūq; also known as Yānīq) is a village in Nazarkahrizi Rural District, Nazarkahrizi District, Hashtrud County, East Azerbaijan Province, Iran. At the 2006 census, its population was 452, in 84 families.
