= Tasteghar =

Tasteghar طاستغار
- Village
- Location within Iran
- Coordinates: 37°17′44″N 46°44′03″E
- Country: Iran
- Province: East Azerbaijan
- County: Hashtrud
- Bakhsh: Nazarkahrizi
- Rural District: Nazarkahrizi

Population (2006)
  - Total: 131
- Time zone: UTC+3:30 (IRST)
  - Summer (DST): UTC+4:30 (IRDT)

Tasteghar (Persian: طاستغار, romanized: Ţāsteghār; also known as Ţās Taghār-e Soflá) is a village in Nazarkahrizi Rural District, Nazarkahrizi District, Hashtrud County, East Azerbaijan Province, Iran. At the 2006 census, its population was 131, in 29 families.
