= Saraskand-e Olya =

Saraskand-e Olya سراسكندعليا
- Village
- Location within Iran
- Coordinates: 37°32′42″N 46°38′15″E
- Country: Iran
- Province: East Azerbaijan
- County: Hashtrud
- Bakhsh: Nazarkahrizi
- Rural District: Almalu

Population (2006)
  - Total: 133
- Time zone: UTC+3:30 (IRST)
  - Summer (DST): UTC+4:30 (IRDT)

Saraskand-e Olya (Persian: سراسكندعليا, also Romanized as Sarāskand-e ‘Olyā; also known as Āzarān-e Bālā, Sarāskand-e Bālā, Sar Eskand, and Sareskand-e Bālā) is a village in Almalu Rural District, Nazarkahrizi District, Hashtrud County, East Azerbaijan Province, Iran. At the 2006 census, its population was 133, in 22 families.
