= Qarah Ghurat =

Qarah Ghurat قره غورت
- Village
- Location within Iran
- Coordinates: 37°24′20″N 46°46′06″E
- Country: Iran
- Province: East Azerbaijan
- County: Hashtrud
- Bakhsh: Nazarkahrizi
- Rural District: Nazarkahrizi

Population (2006)
  - Total: 117
- Time zone: UTC+3:30 (IRST)
  - Summer (DST): UTC+4:30 (IRDT)

Qarah Ghurat (Persian: قره غورت, romanized: Qarah Ghūrat; also known as Qarah ‘Owrat) is a village in Nazarkahrizi Rural District, Nazarkahrizi District, Hashtrud County, East Azerbaijan Province, Iran. At the 2006 census, its population was 117, in 22 families.
