= Yanbolaghi-ye Olya =

Yanbolaghi-ye Olya يانبلاغي عليا
- Village
- Location within Iran
- Coordinates: 37°16′08″N 46°40′43″E
- Country: Iran
- Province: East Azerbaijan
- County: Hashtrud
- Bakhsh: Nazarkahrizi
- Rural District: Nazarkahrizi

Population (2006)
  - Total: 154
- Time zone: UTC+3:30 (IRST)
  - Summer (DST): UTC+4:30 (IRDT)

Yanbolaghi-ye Olya (Persian: يانبلاغي عليا, romanized: Yānbolāghī-ye ‘Olyā) is a village in Nazarkahrizi Rural District, Nazarkahrizi District, Hashtrud County, East Azerbaijan Province, Iran. At the 2006 census, its population was 154, in 29 families.
