= Yanbolaghi-ye Sofla =

Yanbolaghi-ye Sofla يان بلاغي سفلي
- Village
- Location within Iran
- Coordinates: 37°17′23″N 46°39′04″E
- Country: Iran
- Province: East Azerbaijan
- County: Hashtrud
- Bakhsh: Nazarkahrizi
- Rural District: Nazarkahrizi

Population (2006)
  - Total: 23
- Time zone: UTC+3:30 (IRST)
  - Summer (DST): UTC+4:30 (IRDT)

Yanbolaghi-ye Sofla (Persian: يان بلاغي سفلي, romanized: Yānbolāghī-ye Soflá) is a village in Nazarkahrizi Rural District, Nazarkahrizi District, Hashtrud County, East Azerbaijan Province, Iran. At the 2006 census, its population was 23, in 5 families.
