= Sufi Hasan =

Sufi Hasan صوفي حسن
- Village
- Location within Iran
- Coordinates: 37°27′05″N 46°41′48″E
- Country: Iran
- Province: East Azerbaijan
- County: Hashtrud
- Bakhsh: Nazarkahrizi
- Rural District: Almalu

Population (2006)
  - Total: 68
- Time zone: UTC+3:30 (IRST)
  - Summer (DST): UTC+4:30 (IRDT)

Sufi Hasan (Persian: صوفي حسن, also Romanized as Şūfī Ḩasan) is a village in Almalu Rural District, Nazarkahrizi District, Hashtrud County, East Azerbaijan Province, Iran. At the 2006 census, its population was 68, in 9 families.
