= Benajuy =

Benajuy (Persian: بناجوئ) may refer to:

- Benajuy-ye Gharbi Rural District
- Benajuy-ye Sharqi Rural District
- Benajuy-ye Shomali Rural District
