= Hasan Kandi =

Hasan Kandi (Persian: حسن كندي) may refer to various places in Iran:

- Hasan Kandi, Ardabil
- Hasan Kandi Kuh, East Azerbaijan Province
- Hasan Kandi Rud, East Azerbaijan Province
- Hasan Kandi, Chaldoran, West Azerbaijan Province
- Hasan Kandi, Miandoab, West Azerbaijan Province
- Hasan Kandi, Poldasht, West Azerbaijan Province
- Hasan Kandi, Showt, West Azerbaijan Province
