= Mohrdar =

Mohrdar مهردار
- Village
- Location within Iran
- Coordinates: 37°30′01″N 46°40′52″E
- Country: Iran
- Province: East Azerbaijan
- County: Hashtrud
- Bakhsh: Nazarkahrizi
- Rural District: Almalu

Population (2006)
  - Total: 306
- Time zone: UTC+3:30 (IRST)
  - Summer (DST): UTC+4:30 (IRDT)

Mohrdar (Persian: مهردار, also Romanized as Mohrdār) is a village in Almalu Rural District, Nazarkahrizi District, Hashtrud County, East Azerbaijan Province, Iran. At the 2006 census, its population was 306, in 50 families.
