= Quyujiq =

Quyujiq قويوجيق
- Village
- Location within Iran
- Coordinates: 37°18′02″N 46°51′42″E
- Country: Iran
- Province: East Azerbaijan
- County: Hashtrud
- Bakhsh: Nazarkahrizi
- Rural District: Nazarkahrizi

Population (2006)
  - Total: 23
- Time zone: UTC+3:30 (IRST)
  - Summer (DST): UTC+4:30 (IRDT)

Quyujiq (Persian: قويوجيق, romanized: Qūyūjīq; also known as Qūyjūq and Qūyūjūq) is a village in Nazarkahrizi Rural District, Nazarkahrizi District, Hashtrud County, East Azerbaijan Province, Iran. At the 2006 census, its population was 23, in 4 families.
