= Jabinad =

Jabinad جبيند
- Village
- Location within Iran
- Coordinates: 37°28′42″N 46°38′52″E
- Country: Iran
- Province: East Azerbaijan
- County: Hashtrud
- Bakhsh: Nazarkahrizi
- Rural District: Almalu

Population (2006)
  - Total: 164
- Time zone: UTC+3:30 (IRST)
  - Summer (DST): UTC+4:30 (IRDT)

Jabinad (Persian: جبيند, also Romanized as Jabīnad and Jabyand) is a village in Almalu Rural District, Nazarkahrizi District, Hashtrud County, East Azerbaijan Province, Iran. At the 2006 census, its population was 164, in 30 families.
