= Talam Khan =

Talam Khan تلم خان
- Village
- Location within Iran
- Coordinates: 37°18′59″N 46°50′01″E
- Country: Iran
- Province: East Azerbaijan
- County: Hashtrud
- Bakhsh: Nazarkahrizi
- Rural District: Nazarkahrizi

Population (2006)
  - Total: 244
- Time zone: UTC+3:30 (IRST)
  - Summer (DST): UTC+4:30 (IRDT)

Talam Khan (Persian: تلم خان, romanized: Talam Khān; also known as Talīm Khān) is a village in Nazarkahrizi Rural District, Nazarkahrizi District, Hashtrud County, East Azerbaijan Province, Iran. At the 2006 census, its population was 244, in 52 families.
