= Kotalah Kamar =

Kotalah Kamar كتله كمر
- Village
- Location within Iran
- Coordinates: 37°24′16″N 46°47′10″E
- Country: Iran
- Province: East Azerbaijan
- County: Hashtrud
- Bakhsh: Nazarkahrizi
- Rural District: Nazarkahrizi

Population (2006)
  - Total: 106
- Time zone: UTC+3:30 (IRST)
  - Summer (DST): UTC+4:30 (IRDT)

Kotalah Kamar (Persian: كتله كمر, also Romanized as Katalah Kamar) is a village in Nazarkahrizi Rural District, Nazarkahrizi District, Hashtrud County, East Azerbaijan Province, Iran. At the 2006 census, its population was 106, in 22 families.
