= Khalifeh Kandi, Hashtrud =

Khalifeh Kandi خليفه كندي
- Village
- Location within Iran
- Coordinates: 37°17′01″N 46°45′33″E
- Country: Iran
- Province: East Azerbaijan
- County: Hashtrud
- Bakhsh: Nazarkahrizi
- Rural District: Nazarkahrizi

Population (2006)
  - Total: 379
- Time zone: UTC+3:30 (IRST)
  - Summer (DST): UTC+4:30 (IRDT)

Khalifeh Kandi (Persian: خليفه كندي, also Romanized as Khalīfeh Kandī; also known as Ḩamīdīyeh, Hātam, Khalfa, Khalīeh Kandī-ye Ḩātam, Khalīfeh, and Khalīfeh Kandī-ye Ḩātam) is a village in Nazarkahrizi Rural District, Nazarkahrizi District, Hashtrud County, East Azerbaijan Province, Iran. At the 2006 census, its population was 379, in 64 families.
