= Aqajan Kandi =

Aqajan Kandi اقاجانكندي
- Village
- Location within Iran
- Coordinates: 37°17′14″N 46°51′36″E
- Country: Iran
- Province: East Azerbaijan
- County: Hashtrud
- Bakhsh: Nazarkahrizi
- Rural District: Nazarkahrizi

Population (2006)
  - Total: 25
- Time zone: UTC+3:30 (IRST)
  - Summer (DST): UTC+4:30 (IRDT)

Aqajan Kandi (Persian: اقاجانكندي, also Romanized as Āqājān Kandī; also known as Āqājeh Kandī) is a village in Nazarkahrizi Rural District, Nazarkahrizi District, Hashtrud County, East Azerbaijan Province, Iran. At the 2006 census, its population was 25, in 5 families.
