= Qarah Div =

Qarah Div قره ديو
- Village
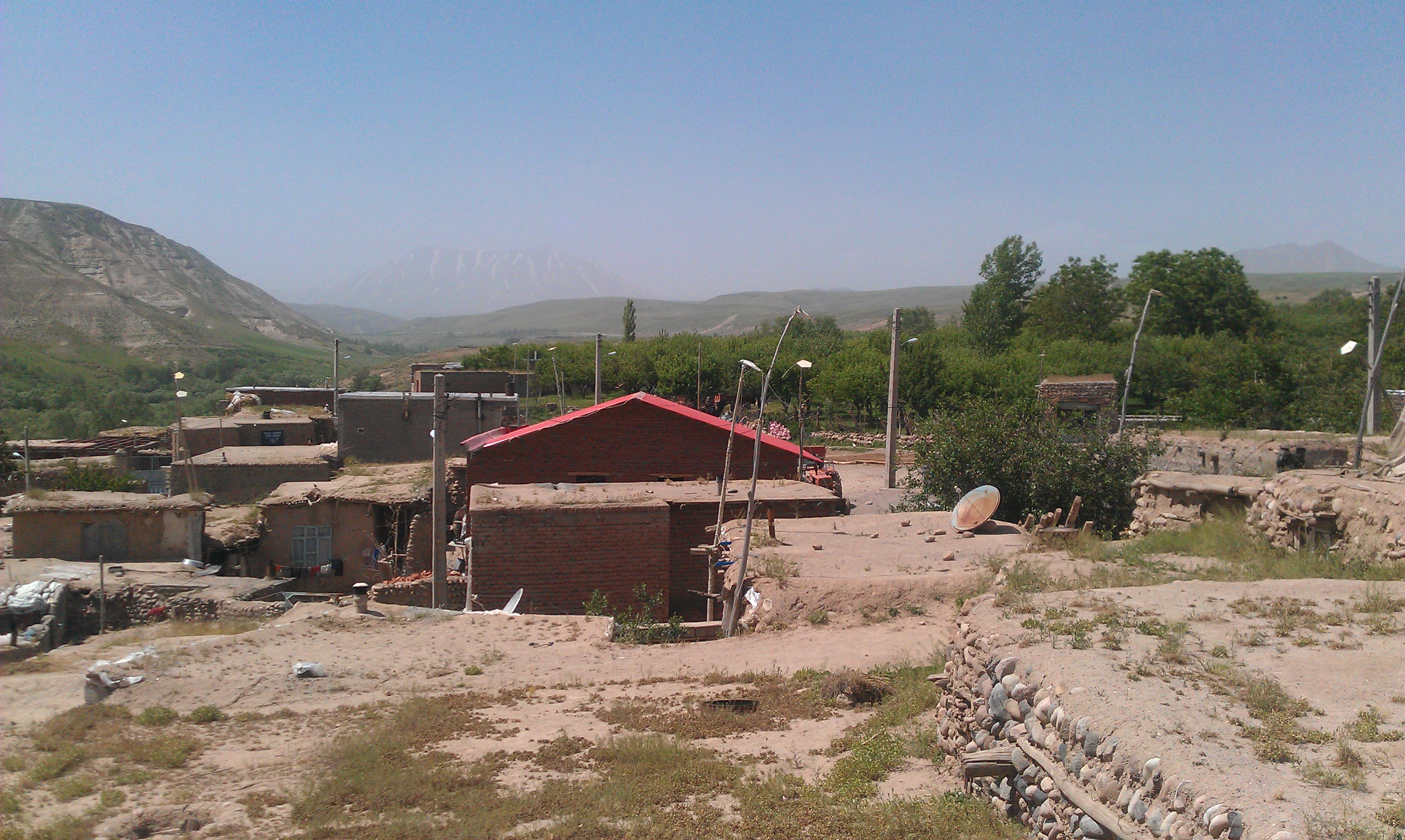

- Location within Iran
- Coordinates: 37°29′05″N 46°35′53″E
- Country: Iran
- Province: East Azerbaijan
- County: Hashtrud
- Bakhsh: Nazarkahrizi
- Rural District: Almalu

Population (2006)
  - Total: 298
- Time zone: UTC+3:30 (IRST)
  - Summer (DST): UTC+4:30 (IRDT)

Qarah Div (Persian: قره ديو, also Romanized as Qarah Dīv) is a village in Almalu Rural District, Nazarkahrizi District, Hashtrud County, East Azerbaijan Province, Iran. At the 2006 census, its population was 298, in 53 families.
