= Qatanqu =

Qatanqu قطانقو
- Village
- Location within Iran
- Coordinates: 37°20′02″N 46°52′34″E
- Country: Iran
- Province: East Azerbaijan
- County: Hashtrud
- Bakhsh: Nazarkahrizi
- Rural District: Nazarkahrizi

Population (2006)
  - Total: 141
- Time zone: UTC+3:30 (IRST)
  - Summer (DST): UTC+4:30 (IRDT)

Qatanqu (Persian: قطانقو, romanized: Qaţānqū and Qatanqū) is a village in Nazarkahrizi Rural District, Nazarkahrizi District, Hashtrud County, East Azerbaijan Province, Iran. At the 2006 census, its population was 141, in 27 families.
