= Qeymas Khan =

Qeymas Khan قيماس خان
- Village
- Location within Iran
- Coordinates: 37°27′33″N 46°04′43″E
- Country: Iran
- Province: East Azerbaijan
- County: Bonab
- Bakhsh: Central
- Rural District: Benajuy-ye Shomali

Population (2006)
  - Total: 47
- Time zone: UTC+3:30 (IRST)
  - Summer (DST): UTC+4:30 (IRDT)

Qeymas Khan (Persian: قيماس خان, also Romanized as Qeymās Khān and Qeymāskhān) is a village in Benajuy-ye Shomali Rural District, in the Central District of Bonab County, East Azerbaijan Province, Iran. At the 2006 census, its population was 47, in 10 families.
