= Dalu Hasan =

Dalu Hasan دلوحسن
- Village
- Location within Iran
- Coordinates: 37°28′11″N 46°41′39″E
- Country: Iran
- Province: East Azerbaijan
- County: Hashtrud
- Bakhsh: Nazarkahrizi
- Rural District: Almalu

Population (2006)
  - Total: 238
- Time zone: UTC+3:30 (IRST)
  - Summer (DST): UTC+4:30 (IRDT)

Dalu Hasan (Persian: دلوحسن, also Romanized as Dalū Ḩasan) is a village in Almalu Rural District, Nazarkahrizi District, Hashtrud County, East Azerbaijan Province, Iran. At the 2006 census, its population was 238, in 44 families.
