= Taleb Chaman =

Taleb Chaman طالب چمن
- Village
- Location within Iran
- Coordinates: 37°12′04″N 46°46′49″E
- Country: Iran
- Province: East Azerbaijan
- County: Hashtrud
- Bakhsh: Nazarkahrizi
- Rural District: Nazarkahrizi

Population (2006)
  - Total: 218
- Time zone: UTC+3:30 (IRST)
  - Summer (DST): UTC+4:30 (IRDT)

Taleb Chaman (Persian: طالب چمن, romanized: Ţāleb Chaman) is a village in Nazarkahrizi Rural District, Nazarkahrizi District, Hashtrud County, East Azerbaijan Province, Iran. At the 2006 census, its population was 218, in 45 families.
