= Yelah Qarshu =

Yelah Qarshu or Yaleh Qarshu or Yaleh Qarshow or Yelehqarshow or Yeleh Qarshu (Persian: يله قارشو) may refer to:

- Yelah Qarshu, Bostanabad
- Yelah Qarshu, Hashtrud
- Yaleh Qarshow, Meyaneh
