= Qurt Qayah Si =

Qurt Qayah Si قورت قيه سي
- Village
- Location within Iran
- Coordinates: 37°15′30″N 46°48′51″E
- Country: Iran
- Province: East Azerbaijan
- County: Hashtrud
- Bakhsh: Nazarkahrizi
- Rural District: Nazarkahrizi

Population (2006)
  - Total: 125
- Time zone: UTC+3:30 (IRST)
  - Summer (DST): UTC+4:30 (IRDT)

Qurt Qayah Si (Persian: قورت قيه سي, romanized: Qūrt Qayah Sī) is a village in Nazarkahrizi Rural District, Nazarkahrizi District, Hashtrud County, East Azerbaijan Province, Iran. At the 2006 census, its population was 125, in 25 families.
