= Hasan Kandi Kuh =

Hasan Kandi Kuh حسن كندي كوه
- Village
- Location within Iran
- Coordinates: 37°32′05″N 46°38′53″E
- Country: Iran
- Province: East Azerbaijan
- County: Hashtrud
- Bakhsh: Nazarkahrizi
- Rural District: Almalu

Population (2006)
  - Total: 51
- Time zone: UTC+3:30 (IRST)
  - Summer (DST): UTC+4:30 (IRDT)

Hasan Kandi Kuh (Persian: حسن كندي كوه, also Romanized as Ḩasan Kandī Kūh; also known as Ḩasan Kandī) is a village in Almalu Rural District, Nazarkahrizi District, Hashtrud County, East Azerbaijan Province, Iran. At the 2006 census, its population was 51, in 7 families.
