= Salman Kandi, East Azerbaijan =

Salman Kandi سلمان كندي
- Village
- Location within Iran
- Coordinates: 37°24′11″N 46°42′33″E
- Country: Iran
- Province: East Azerbaijan
- County: Hashtrud
- Bakhsh: Nazarkahrizi
- Rural District: Nazarkahrizi

Population (2006)
  - Total: 91
- Time zone: UTC+3:30 (IRST)
  - Summer (DST): UTC+4:30 (IRDT)

Salman Kandi (Persian: سلمان كندي, romanized: Salmān Kandī; also known as Soleymān Kandī) is a village in Nazarkahrizi Rural District, Nazarkahrizi District, Hashtrud County, East Azerbaijan Province, Iran. At the 2006 census, its population was 91, in 19 families.
