= Idahlu-ye Khan =

Idahlu-ye Khan ايده لوخان
- Village
- Location within Iran
- Coordinates: 37°24′55″N 46°39′03″E
- Country: Iran
- Province: East Azerbaijan
- County: Hashtrud
- Bakhsh: Nazarkahrizi
- Rural District: Almalu

Population (2006)
  - Total: 139
- Time zone: UTC+3:30 (IRST)
  - Summer (DST): UTC+4:30 (IRDT)

Idahlu-ye Khan (Persian: ايده لوخان, also romanized as Īdahlū-ye Khān) is a village in Almalu Rural District, Nazarkahrizi District, Hashtrud County, East Azerbaijan Province, Iran. At the 2006 census, its population was 139, in 24 families.
