= Khalilvand =

Village in East Azerbaijan province, Iran

Khalilvand Persian: خليلوند
- Village
- Location within Iran
- Coordinates: 37°15′45″N 46°03′07″E
- Country: Iran
- Province: East Azerbaijan
- County: Bonab
- District: Central
- Rural District: Benajuy-ye Gharbi

Population (2016)
  - Total: 1,313
- Time zone: UTC+3:30 (IRST)

Khalilvand (Persian: خليلوند) (Note: Also romanized as Khalīlvand; also known as Khalīlabad and Kholvand) is a village in Benajuy-ye Gharbi Rural District of the Central District in Bonab County, East Azerbaijan province, Iran.

== Demographics ==
=== Population ===
At the time of the 2006 National Census, the village's population was 1,187 in 293 households. The following census in 2011 counted 1,314 people in 354 households. The 2016 census measured the population of the village as 1,313 people in 390 households.
