= Ravesht-e Kuchek =

Village in East Azerbaijan province, Iran

Ravesht-e Kuchek Persian: روشت كوچك
- Village
- Location within Iran
- Coordinates: 37°22′45″N 46°04′12″E
- Country: Iran
- Province: East Azerbaijan
- County: Bonab
- District: Central
- Rural District: Benajuy-ye Shomali

Population (2016)
  - Total: 1,524
- Time zone: UTC+3:30 (IRST)

Ravesht-e Kuchek (Persian: روشت كوچك) (Note: Also romanized as Ravesht-e Kūchek) is a village in Benajuy-ye Shomali Rural District of the Central District in Bonab County, East Azerbaijan province, Iran.

== Demographics ==
=== Population ===
At the time of the 2006 National Census, the village's population was 1,492 in 346 households. The following census in 2011 counted 1,314 people in 363 households. The 2016 census measured the population of the village as 1,524 people in 455 households.
