= Zavaraq =

Village in East Azerbaijan province, Iran

Zavaraq Persian: زوارق
- Village
- Location within Iran
- Coordinates: 37°17′54″N 46°04′47″E
- Country: Iran
- Province: East Azerbaijan
- County: Bonab
- District: Central
- Rural District: Benajuy-ye Gharbi

Population (2016)
  - Total: 2,539
- Time zone: UTC+3:30 (IRST)

Zavaraq (Persian: زوارق) (Note: Also romanized as Zavāraq; also known as Tāzeh Kand-e Zavāraq) is a village in Benajuy-ye Gharbi Rural District of the Central District in Bonab County, East Azerbaijan province, Iran.

== Demographics ==
=== Population ===
At the time of the 2006 National Census, the village's population was 2,247 in 573 households. The following census in 2011 counted 2,196 people in 629 households. The 2016 census measured the population of the village as 2,539 people in 654 households.
