= Ravesht-e Bozorg =

Village in East Azerbaijan province, Iran

Ravesht-e Bozorg Persian: روشت بزرگ
- Village
- Location within Iran
- Coordinates: 37°22′22″N 46°06′39″E
- Country: Iran
- Province: East Azerbaijan
- County: Bonab
- District: Central
- Rural District: Benajuy-ye Shomali

Population (2016)
  - Total: 2,231
- Time zone: UTC+3:30 (IRST)

Ravesht-e Bozorg (Persian: روشت بزرگ) (Note: Also known as Rosht-e-Bozorg) is a village in, and the capital of, Benajuy-ye Shomali Rural District in the Central District of Bonab County, East Azerbaijan province, Iran.

== Demographics ==
=== Population ===
At the time of the 2006 National Census, the village's population was 2,616 in 642 households. The following census in 2011 counted 2,479 people in 716 households. The 2016 census measured the population of the village as 2,231 people in 721 households.
