= Qarqa =

Qarqa (Persian: قارقا) may refer to:

- Qarqa, Hashtrud
- Qarqa, Sarab
