= Zarin =

Zarin may refer to:

- Zarin (comics), a comic book character
- Zarin, Iran, a village in Kerman Province, Iran
- Zarin-e Olya, a village in East Azerbaijan Province, Iran
- Zarin-e Sofla, a village in East Azerbaijan Province, Iran
- Zarin Mehta (born 1938), Canadian philanthropist
- Jill Zarin (born 1963), American reality television personality
- Sergey Zarin (1875–1935), Russian theologian

== See also ==
- Zariņš, a surname
- Zarrin (disambiguation)
- Zareen Khan (born 1987), Indian actress and model
- Zareena Moidu, Indian actress
- Nikhat Zareen (born 1996), Indian boxer
