= Qarah Chopoq =

Village in East Azerbaijan province, Iran

Qarah Chopoq Persian: قره‌چپق
- Village
- Location within Iran
- Coordinates: 37°18′57″N 46°01′11″E
- Country: Iran
- Province: East Azerbaijan
- County: Bonab
- District: Central
- Rural District: Benajuy-ye Gharbi

Population (2016)
  - Total: 5,456
- Time zone: UTC+3:30 (IRST)

Qarah Chopoq (Persian: قره‌چپق) (Note: Also romanized as Qareh Chopoq) is a village in Benajuy-ye Gharbi Rural District of the Central District in Bonab County, East Azerbaijan province, Iran.

== Demographics ==
=== Population ===
At the time of the 2006 National Census, the village's population was 5,915 in 1,528 households. The following census in 2011 counted 5,718 people in 1,730 households. The 2016 census measured the population of the village as 5,456 people in 1,761 households. It was the most populous village in its rural district.
