= Khaneh-ye Barq-e Isa Khani =

Khaneh-ye Barq-e Isa Khani خانه‌برق عیسی‌خانی
- Village
- Location within Iran
- Coordinates: 37°18′25″N 46°00′39″E
- Country: Iran
- Province: East Azerbaijan
- County: Bonab
- Bakhsh: Central
- Rural District: Benajuy-ye Gharbi

Population (2006)
  - Total: 34
- Time zone: UTC+3:30 (IRST)
  - Summer (DST): UTC+4:30 (IRDT)

Khaneh-ye Barq-e Isa Khani (Persian: خانه‌برق عیسی‌خانی, also Romanized as Khāneh-ye Barq-e ‘Īsá Khānī; also known as ‘Īsá Khānī and Tāzeh Kand-e ‘Īsá Khānī) is a village in Benajuy-ye Gharbi Rural District, in the Central District of Bonab County, East Azerbaijan Province, Iran. At the 2006 census, its population was 34, in 9 families.
