= Chelqai =

Village in East Azerbaijan province, Iran

Chelqai Persian: چلقايي
- Village
- Location within Iran
- Coordinates: 37°19′16″N 46°06′09″E
- Country: Iran
- Province: East Azerbaijan
- County: Bonab
- District: Central
- Rural District: Benajuy-ye Sharqi

Population (2016)
  - Total: 3,412
- Time zone: UTC+3:30 (IRST)

Chelqai (Persian: چلقايي) (Note: Also romanized as Chelqā’ī) is a village in, and the capital of, Benajuy-ye Sharqi Rural District in the Central District of Bonab County, East Azerbaijan province, Iran. The previous capital of the rural district was the village of Khusheh Mehr, now a city.

== Demographics ==
=== Population ===
At the time of the 2006 National Census, the village's population was 4,573 in 1,142 households. The following census in 2011 counted 4,662 people in 1,371 households. The 2016 census measured the population of the village as 3,412 people in 1,185 households.
