= Tazeh Kand-e Khusheh Mehr =

Village in East Azerbaijan province, Iran

Tazeh Kand-e Khusheh Mehr Persian: تازه كندخوشه مهر
- Village
- Location within Iran
- Coordinates: 37°17′38″N 46°05′52″E
- Country: Iran
- Province: East Azerbaijan
- County: Bonab
- District: Central
- Rural District: Benajuy-ye Sharqi

Population (2016)
  - Total: 1,358
- Time zone: UTC+3:30 (IRST)

Tazeh Kand-e Khusheh Mehr (Persian: تازه كندخوشه مهر) (Note: Also romanized as Tāzeh Kand-e Khūsheh Mehr) is a village in Benajuy-ye Sharqi Rural District of the Central District in Bonab County, East Azerbaijan province, Iran.

== Demographics ==
=== Population ===
At the time of the 2006 National Census, the village's population was 1,814 in 421 households. The following census in 2011 counted 1,736 people in 502 households. The 2016 census measured the population of the village as 1,358 people in 438 households.
