= Basit (disambiguation) =

Basit is a metre used in classical Arabic poetry.

Basit may also refer to:

== Places ==
- Basit, Ardabil, a village in Ardabil Province, Iran
- Basit, Hashtrud, a village in East Azerbaijan Province, Iran
- Basit, Meyaneh, a village in East Azerbaijan Province, Iran

== People with given name Basit ==
- Basit Ali, Pakistani cricketer
- Basit Ashfaq, Pakistani squash player

== People with surname Basit ==
- Malik Basit or Malik B. (1972–2020), American rapper
