= Akhund Qeshlaq =

Village in East Azerbaijan province, Iran

Akhund Qeshlaq Persian: اخوندقشلاق
- Village
- Location within Iran
- Coordinates: 37°21′27″N 46°01′11″E
- Country: Iran
- Province: East Azerbaijan
- County: Bonab
- District: Central
- Rural District: Benajuy-ye Gharbi

Population (2016)
  - Total: 4,611
- Time zone: UTC+3:30 (IRST)

Akhund Qeshlaq (Persian: اخوندقشلاق) (Note: Also romanized as Ākhūnd Qeshlāq; also known as Qeshlāq Ākhūnd) is a village in Benajuy-ye Gharbi Rural District of the Central District in Bonab County, East Azerbaijan province, Iran.

== Demographics ==
=== Population ===
At the time of the 2006 National Census, the village's population was 4,409 in 1,096 households. The following census in 2011 counted 4,765 people in 1,391 households. The 2016 census measured the population of the village as 4,611 people in 1,436 households.
