= Kohel Bolagh, Almalu =

Kohel Bolagh كهل بلاغ
- Village
- Location within Iran
- Coordinates: 37°31′08″N 46°31′35″E
- Country: Iran
- Province: East Azerbaijan
- County: Hashtrud
- Bakhsh: Nazarkahrizi
- Rural District: Almalu

Population (2006)
  - Total: 24
- Time zone: UTC+3:30 (IRST)
  - Summer (DST): UTC+4:30 (IRDT)

Kohel Bolagh (Persian: كهل بلاغ, also Romanized as Kohel Bolāgh; also known as Kohel Bolāgh-e Sahand and Kohel Bolāghī) is a village in Almalu Rural District, Nazarkahrizi District, Hashtrud County, East Azerbaijan Province, Iran. At the 2006 census, its population was 24, in 7 families.
