= Nokhvodabad =

Village in East Azerbaijan province, Iran

Nokhvodabad Persian: نخوداباد
- Village
- Location within Iran
- Coordinates: 37°22′58″N 46°38′32″E
- Country: Iran
- Province: East Azerbaijan
- County: Hashtrud
- District: Nazarkahrizi
- Rural District: Almalu

Population (2016)
  - Total: 559
- Time zone: UTC+3:30 (IRST)

Nokhvodabad (Persian: نخوداباد) (Note: Also romanized as Nokhvodābād; also known as Nokhodābād) is a village in Almalu Rural District of Nazarkahrizi District in Hashtrud County, East Azerbaijan province, Iran.

== Demographics ==
=== Population ===
At the time of the 2006 National Census, the village's population was 594 in 102 households. The following census in 2011 counted 465 people in 123 households. The 2016 census measured the population of the village as 559 people in 171 households.
