= Dushdur =

Dushdur دوشدور
- Village
- Location within Iran
- Coordinates: 37°34′12″N 46°38′44″E
- Country: Iran
- Province: East Azerbaijan
- County: Hashtrud
- Bakhsh: Nazarkahrizi
- Rural District: Almalu

Population (2006)
  - Total: 176
- Time zone: UTC+3:30 (IRST)
  - Summer (DST): UTC+4:30 (IRDT)

Dushdur (Persian: دوشدور, also Romanized as Dūshdūr; also known as Dūsh and Dūshar) is a village in Almalu Rural District, Nazarkahrizi District, Hashtrud County, East Azerbaijan Province, Iran. At the 2006 census, its population was 176, in 28 families.
