= Qarah Zaki, East Azerbaijan =

Qarah Zaki قره زكي
- Village
- Location within Iran
- Coordinates: 37°26′43″N 45°59′50″E
- Country: Iran
- Province: East Azerbaijan
- County: Bonab
- Bakhsh: Central
- Rural District: Benajuy-ye Shomali

Population (2006)
  - Total: 100
- Time zone: UTC+3:30 (IRST)
  - Summer (DST): UTC+4:30 (IRDT)

Qarah Zaki (Persian: قره زكي, also Romanized as Qarah Zakī) is a village in Benajuy-ye Shomali Rural District, in the Central District of Bonab County, East Azerbaijan Province, Iran. At the 2006 census, its population was 100, in 23 families.
