= Soleyman Kandi =

Soleyman Kandi (Persian: سليمان كندي) may refer to:

- Soleyman Kandi, East Azerbaijan
- Soleyman Kandi, Kurdistan
- Soleyman Kandi, West Azerbaijan
