= Qarqa, Hashtrud =

Qarqa قارقا
- Village
- Location within Iran
- Coordinates: 37°12′13″N 46°45′25″E
- Country: Iran
- Province: East Azerbaijan
- County: Hashtrud
- Bakhsh: Nazarkahrizi
- Rural District: Nazarkahrizi

Population (2006)
  - Total: 285
- Time zone: UTC+3:30 (IRST)
  - Summer (DST): UTC+4:30 (IRDT)

Qarqa (Persian: قارقا, romanized: Qārqā) is a village in Nazarkahrizi Rural District, Nazarkahrizi District, Hashtrud County, East Azerbaijan Province, Iran. At the 2006 census, its population was 285, in 48 families.
