= Pasha Beyg =

Village in East Azerbaijan province, Iran

Pasha Beyg Persian: پاشابيگ
- Village
- Location within Iran
- Coordinates: 37°24′33″N 46°41′36″E
- Country: Iran
- Province: East Azerbaijan
- County: Hashtrud
- District: Nazarkahrizi
- Rural District: Almalu

Population (2016)
  - Total: 315
- Time zone: UTC+3:30 (IRST)

Pasha Beyg (Persian: پاشابيگ) (Note: Also romanized as Pāshā Beyg; also known as Pāshā Beyk) is a village in Almalu Rural District of Nazarkahrizi District in Hashtrud County, East Azerbaijan province, Iran.

== Demographics ==
=== Population ===
At the time of the 2006 National Census, the village's population was 347 in 64 households. The following census in 2011 counted 366 people in 100 households. The 2016 census measured the population of the village as 315 people in 103 households.
