= Ali Khvajeh =

Village in East Azerbaijan province, Iran

Ali Khvajeh Persian: علي خواجه
- Village
- Location within Iran
- Coordinates: 37°18′02″N 46°02′10″E
- Country: Iran
- Province: East Azerbaijan
- County: Bonab
- District: Central
- Rural District: Benajuy-ye Gharbi

Population (2016)
  - Total: 1,663
- Time zone: UTC+3:30 (IRST)

Ali Khvajeh (Persian: علي خواجه) (Note: Also romanized as ‘Alī Khvājeh) is a village in Benajuy-ye Gharbi Rural District of the Central District in Bonab County, East Azerbaijan province, Iran.

== Demographics ==
=== Population ===
At the time of the 2006 National Census, the village's population was 1,418 in 348 households. The following census in 2011 counted 1,400 people in 382 households. The 2016 census measured the population of the village as 1,663 people in 516 households.
