= Zerrin =

Zerrin is a Turkish feminine given name which, etymologically, comes from Persian (زرین, "Zarrin", lit. 'golden'). Notable people with the name include:

- Zerrin Temiz musician, vocalist, music producer, singer of "Hislerim" song
- Zerrin Bakır (born 1981), Turkish football coach and former football player
- Zerrin Bölükbaşı (1919–2010), Turkish sculptor
- Zerrin Güngör (born 1955), Turkish civil servant, President of the Council of State of Turkey
- Zerrin Tekindor (born 1964), Turkish actress
- Zerrin Özer (born 1957), Turkish pop singer

== See also ==
- Zarin (disambiguation)
- Zarrin (disambiguation)
- Narcissus poeticus, a flower sometimes referred to by this name in Turkish
- Prizren, a city in Kosovo sometimes referred to by this name
