= Yengikand-e Khusheh Mehr =

Village in East Azerbaijan province, Iran

Yengikand-e Khusheh Mehr Persian: ينگي كندخوشه مهر
- Village
- Location within Iran
- Coordinates: 37°17′21″N 46°09′10″E
- Country: Iran
- Province: East Azerbaijan
- County: Bonab
- District: Central
- Rural District: Benajuy-ye Sharqi

Population (2016)
  - Total: 1,061
- Time zone: UTC+3:30 (IRST)

Yengikand-e Khusheh Mehr (Persian: ينگي كندخوشه مهر) (Note: Also romanized as Yengīkand-e Khūsheh Mehr; also known as Yengī Kand) is a village in Benajuy-ye Sharqi Rural District of the Central District in Bonab County, East Azerbaijan province, Iran.

== Demographics ==
=== Population ===
At the time of the 2006 National Census, the village's population was 1,131 in 241 households. The following census in 2011 counted 1,085 people in 283 households. The 2016 census measured the population of the village as 1,061 people in 314 households.
