= Yeli Daraq-e Sofla =

Yeli Daraq-e Sofla يلي درق سفلي
- Village
- Location within Iran
- Coordinates: 37°20′36″N 46°42′00″E
- Country: Iran
- Province: East Azerbaijan
- County: Hashtrud
- Bakhsh: Nazarkahrizi
- Rural District: Nazarkahrizi

Population (2006)
  - Total: 116
- Time zone: UTC+3:30 (IRST)
  - Summer (DST): UTC+4:30 (IRDT)

Yeli Daraq-e Sofla (Persian: يلي درق سفلي, romanized: Yelī Daraq-e Soflá) is a village in Nazarkahrizi Rural District, Nazarkahrizi District, Hashtrud County, East Azerbaijan Province, Iran. At the 2006 census, its population was 116, in 25 families.
