= Alqu, Bonab =

Village in East Azerbaijan province, Iran

Alqu Persian: القو
- Village
- Location within Iran
- Coordinates: 37°25′34″N 46°05′32″E
- Country: Iran
- Province: East Azerbaijan
- County: Bonab
- District: Central
- Rural District: Benajuy-ye Shomali

Population (2016)
  - Total: 1,564
- Time zone: UTC+3:30 (IRST)

Alqu (Persian: القو) (Note: Also romanized as Ālqū) is a village in Benajuy-ye Shomali Rural District of the Central District in Bonab County, East Azerbaijan province, Iran.

== Demographics ==
=== Population ===
At the time of the 2006 National Census, the village's population was 1,710 in 359 households. The following census in 2011 counted 1,659 people in 500 households. The 2016 census measured the population of the village as 1,564 people in 507 households.

== Etymology ==
According to Vladimir Minorsky, the name of this village is derived from the Mongolian given name Alghū.
