= Qareh Qeshlaq, Bonab =

Village in East Azerbaijan province, Iran

Qareh Qeshlaq Persian: قره قشلاق
- Village
- Location within Iran
- Coordinates: 37°13′54″N 45°58′24″E
- Country: Iran
- Province: East Azerbaijan
- County: Bonab
- District: Central
- Rural District: Benajuy-ye Gharbi

Population (2016)
  - Total: 550
- Time zone: UTC+3:30 (IRST)

Qareh Qeshlaq (Persian: قره قشلاق) (Note: Also romanized as Qareh Qeshlāq; also known as Kara Kishlyg and Qara Qishlaq) is a village in Benajuy-ye Gharbi Rural District of the Central District in Bonab County, East Azerbaijan province, Iran.

== Demographics ==
=== Population ===
At the time of the 2006 National Census, the village's population was 540 in 112 households. The following census in 2011 counted 599 people in 165 households. The 2016 census measured the population of the village as 550 people in 164 households.
