= Molla Jiq =

Village in East Azerbaijan province, Iran

Molla Jiq Persian: ملاجيق
- Village
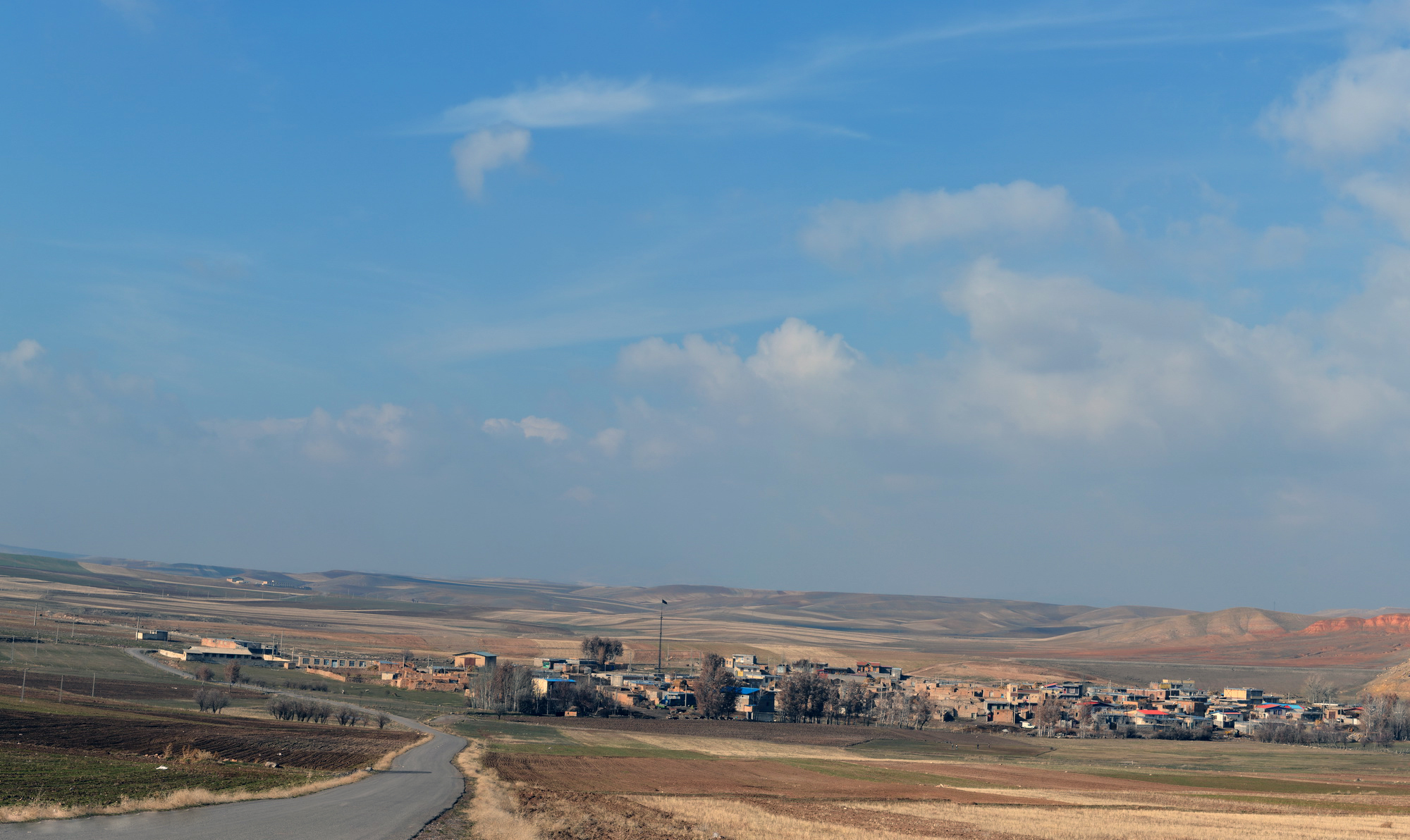
- Panorama of the village of Molla Jiq

- Location within Iran
- Coordinates: 37°19′36″N 46°47′34″E
- Country: Iran
- Province: East Azerbaijan
- County: Hashtrud
- District: Nazarkahrizi
- Rural District: Nazarkahrizi

Population (2016)
  - Total: 334
- Time zone: UTC+3:30 (IRST)

Molla Jiq (Persian: ملاجيق) (Note: Also romanized as Mollā Jīq) is a village in Nazarkahrizi Rural District of Nazarkahrizi District in Hashtrud County, East Azerbaijan province, Iran.

== Demographics ==
=== Population ===
At the time of the 2006 National Census, the village's population was 339 in 75 households. The following census in 2011 counted 339 people in 89 households. The 2016 census measured the population of the village as 334 people in 100 households.
