= Alaqayah =

Village in East Azerbaijan province, Iran

Alaqayah Persian: الاقيه
- Village
- Location within Iran
- Coordinates: 37°23′36″N 46°48′05″E
- Country: Iran
- Province: East Azerbaijan
- County: Hashtrud
- District: Nazarkahrizi
- Rural District: Nazarkahrizi

Population (2016)
  - Total: 396
- Time zone: UTC+3:30 (IRST)

Alaqayah (Persian: الاقيه) (Note: Also romanized as Ālāqayah) is a village in Nazarkahrizi Rural District of Nazarkahrizi District in Hashtrud County, East Azerbaijan province, Iran.

== Demographics ==
=== Population ===
At the time of the 2006 National Census, the village's population was 508 in 116 households. The following census in 2011 counted 542 people in 151 households. The 2016 census measured the population of the village as 396 people in 120 households.
