= Bolqan Hasan Kandi =

Bolqan Hasan Kandi بلقان حسن كندي
- Village
- Location within Iran
- Coordinates: 37°27′01″N 47°13′00″E
- Country: Iran
- Province: East Azerbaijan
- County: Hashtrud
- Bakhsh: Central
- Rural District: Aliabad

Population (2006)
  - Total: 90
- Time zone: UTC+3:30 (IRST)
  - Summer (DST): UTC+4:30 (IRDT)

Bolqan Hasan Kandi (Persian: بلقان حسن كندي, also Romanized as Bolqān Ḩasan Kandī; also known as Bolqān) is a village in Aliabad Rural District, in the Central District of Hashtrud County, East Azerbaijan Province, Iran. At the 2006 census, its population was 90, in 15 families.
