= Omran Kandi =

Village in East Azerbaijan province, Iran

Omran Kandi Persian: عمران كندي
- Village
- Location within Iran
- Coordinates: 37°21′51″N 46°40′10″E
- Country: Iran
- Province: East Azerbaijan
- County: Hashtrud
- District: Nazarkahrizi
- Rural District: Nazarkahrizi

Population (2016)
  - Total: 355
- Time zone: UTC+3:30 (IRST)

Omran Kandi (Persian: عمران كندي) (Note: Also romanized as ‘Omrān Kandī) is a village in Nazarkahrizi Rural District of Nazarkahrizi District in Hashtrud County, East Azerbaijan province, Iran.

== Demographics ==
=== Population ===
At the time of the 2006 National Census, the village's population was 481 in 92 households. The following census in 2011 counted 485 people in 105 households. The 2016 census measured the population of the village as 355 people in 106 households.
