= Yelah Qarshu, Hashtrud =

Yelah Qarshu يله قارشو
- Village
- Location within Iran
- Coordinates: 37°20′24″N 46°50′13″E
- Country: Iran
- Province: East Azerbaijan
- County: Hashtrud
- Bakhsh: Nazarkahrizi
- Rural District: Nazarkahrizi

Population (2006)
  - Total: 120
- Time zone: UTC+3:30 (IRST)
  - Summer (DST): UTC+4:30 (IRDT)

Yelah Qarshu (Persian: يله قارشو, romanized: Yelah Qārshū) is a village in Nazarkahrizi Rural District, Nazarkahrizi District, Hashtrud County, East Azerbaijan Province, Iran. At the 2006 census, its population was 120, in 21 families.
