= Tutah Khaneh =

Village in East Azerbaijan province, Iran

Tutah Khaneh Persian: توته خانه
- Village
- Location within Iran
- Coordinates: 37°30′00″N 46°08′04″E
- Country: Iran
- Province: East Azerbaijan
- County: Bonab
- District: Central
- Rural District: Benajuy-ye Shomali

Population (2016)
  - Total: 608
- Time zone: UTC+3:30 (IRST)

Tutah Khaneh (Persian: توته خانه) (Note: Also romanized as Tūtah Khāneh; also known as Tūtā Khāneh) is a village in Benajuy-ye Shomali Rural District of the Central District in Bonab County, East Azerbaijan province, Iran.

== Demographics ==
=== Population ===
At the time of the 2006 National Census, the village's population was 529 in 117 households. The following census in 2011 counted 600 people in 163 households. The 2016 census measured the population of the village as 608 people in 182 households.
