= Joghol-e Olya =

Joghol-e Olya جغل عليا
- Village
- Location within Iran
- Coordinates: 37°18′19″N 46°41′21″E
- Country: Iran
- Province: East Azerbaijan
- County: Hashtrud
- Bakhsh: Nazarkahrizi
- Rural District: Nazarkahrizi

Population (2006)
  - Total: 71
- Time zone: UTC+3:30 (IRST)
  - Summer (DST): UTC+4:30 (IRDT)

Joghol-e Olya (Persian: جغل عليا, also Romanized as Joghol-e ‘Olyā) is a village in Nazarkahrizi Rural District, Nazarkahrizi District, Hashtrud County, East Azerbaijan Province, Iran. At the 2006 census, its population was 71, in 17 families.
