= Zanjirabad, East Azerbaijan =

Zanjirabad زنجيراباد
- Village
- Location within Iran
- Coordinates: 37°25′35″N 46°40′20″E
- Country: Iran
- Province: East Azerbaijan
- County: Hashtrud
- Bakhsh: Nazarkahrizi
- Rural District: Almalu

Population (2006)
  - Total: 49
- Time zone: UTC+3:30 (IRST)
  - Summer (DST): UTC+4:30 (IRDT)

Zanjirabad (Persian: زنجيراباد, also Romanized as Zanjīrābād) is a village in Almalu Rural District, Nazarkahrizi District, Hashtrud County, East Azerbaijan Province, Iran. As of the 2006 census, its population was 49, across 10 distinct families.
