= Kohel Bolagh =

Kohel Bolagh (Persian: كهل بلاغ) may refer to:

- Kohel Bolagh, Almalu
- Kohel Bolagh, Nazarkahrizi
