= Dizaj-e Parvaneh =

Village in East Azerbaijan province, Iran

Dizaj-e Parvaneh Persian: ديزج پروانه
- Village
- Location within Iran
- Coordinates: 37°19′11″N 46°07′53″E
- Country: Iran
- Province: East Azerbaijan
- County: Bonab
- District: Central
- Rural District: Benajuy-ye Sharqi

Population (2016)
  - Total: 931
- Time zone: UTC+3:30 (IRST)

Dizaj-e Parvaneh (Persian: ديزج پروانه,) (Note: Also romanized as Dīzaj-e Parvāneh) is a village in Benajuy-ye Sharqi Rural District of the Central District in Bonab County, East Azerbaijan province, Iran.

== Demographics ==
=== Population ===
At the time of the 2006 National Census, the village's population was 1,028 in 248 households. The following census in 2011 counted 734 people in 213 households. The 2016 census measured the population of the village as 931 people in 292 households.
