= Chopoqlu, Bonab =

Village in East Azerbaijan province, Iran

Chopoqlu Persian: چپقلو
- Village
- Location within Iran
- Coordinates: 37°12′27″N 46°01′00″E
- Country: Iran
- Province: East Azerbaijan
- County: Bonab
- District: Central
- Rural District: Benajuy-ye Gharbi

Population (2016)
  - Total: 3,644
- Time zone: UTC+3:30 (IRST)

Chopoqlu (Persian: چپقلو) (Note: Also romanized as Chopoqlū) is a village in Benajuy-ye Gharbi Rural District of the Central District in Bonab County, East Azerbaijan province, Iran.

== Demographics ==
=== Population ===
At the time of the 2006 National Census, the village's population was 3,189 in 707 households. The following census in 2011 counted 3,191 people in 890 households. The 2016 census measured the population of the village as 3,644 people in 1,096 households.
