= Afshar Jiq =

Afshar Jiq افشارجیق
- Village
- Location within Iran
- Coordinates: 37°24′36″N 47°13′46″E
- Country: Iran
- Province: East Azerbaijan
- County: Hashtrud
- Bakhsh: Central
- Rural District: Aliabad

Population (2006)
  - Total: 459
- Time zone: UTC+3:30 (IRST)
  - Summer (DST): UTC+4:30 (IRDT)

Afshar Jiq (Persian: افشارجیق, also Romanized as Afshār Jīq; also known as Afshār Ḩaq, Afshār Jeq, and Ushadik) is a village in Aliabad Rural District, in the Central District of Hashtrud County, East Azerbaijan Province, Iran. At the 2006 census, its population was 459, in 86 families.
