= Joghol =

Joghol (Persian: جغل) may refer to:

- Joghol-e Olya
- Joghol-e Sofla
