= Qarah Kalak =

Village in East Azerbaijan province, Iran

Qarah Kalak Persian: قره كلك
- Village
- Location within Iran
- Coordinates: 37°30′27″N 46°37′54″E
- Country: Iran
- Province: East Azerbaijan
- County: Hashtrud
- District: Nazarkahrizi
- Rural District: Almalu

Population (2016)
  - Total: 364
- Time zone: UTC+3:30 (IRST)

Qarah Kalak (Persian: قره كلك) is a village in Almalu Rural District of Nazarkahrizi District in Hashtrud County, East Azerbaijan province, Iran.

== Demographics ==
=== Population ===
At the time of the 2006 National Census, the village's population was 466 in 92 households. The following census in 2011 counted 385 people in 101 households. The 2016 census measured the population of the village as 364 people in 96 households.
