= Idahlu-ye Khalifeh =

Idahlu-ye Khalifeh ایده‌لوی خلیفه
- Village
- Location within Iran
- Coordinates: 37°25′40″N 46°43′26″E
- Country: Iran
- Province: East Azerbaijan
- County: Hashtrud
- Bakhsh: Nazarkahrizi
- Rural District: Almalu

Population (2006)
  - Total: 95
- Time zone: UTC+3:30 (IRST)
  - Summer (DST): UTC+4:30 (IRDT)

Idahlu-ye Khalifeh (Persian: ایده‌لوی خلیفه, also Romanized as Īdahlū-ye Khalīfeh) is a village in Almalu Rural District, Nazarkahrizi District, Hashtrud County, East Azerbaijan Province, Iran. At the 2006 census, its population was 95, in 26 families.
