= Qorban Kandi, Hashtrud =

Qorban Kandi قربان كندي
- Village
- Location within Iran
- Coordinates: 37°32′26″N 46°35′51″E
- Country: Iran
- Province: East Azerbaijan
- County: Hashtrud
- Bakhsh: Nazarkahrizi
- Rural District: Almalu

Population (2006)
  - Total: 20
- Time zone: UTC+3:30 (IRST)
  - Summer (DST): UTC+4:30 (IRDT)

Qorban Kandi (Persian: قربان كندي, also Romanized as Qorbān Kandī) is a village in Almalu Rural District, Nazarkahrizi District, Hashtrud County, East Azerbaijan Province, Iran. At the 2006 census, its population was 20, in 4 families.
