= Do Deh =

Do Deh دوده
- Village
- Location within Iran
- Coordinates: 37°25′24″N 47°09′57″E
- Country: Iran
- Province: East Azerbaijan
- County: Hashtrud
- Bakhsh: Central
- Rural District: Aliabad

Population (2006)
  - Total: 177
- Time zone: UTC+3:30 (IRST)
  - Summer (DST): UTC+4:30 (IRDT)

Do Deh (Persian: دوده, also Romanized as Dodeh) is a village in Aliabad Rural District, in the Central District of Hashtrud County, East Azerbaijan Province, Iran. At the 2006 census, its population was 177, in 37 families.
