= Zavosht =

Village in East Azerbaijan province, Iran

Zavosht Persian: زاوشت
- Village
- Location within Iran
- Coordinates: 37°21′57″N 46°04′18″E
- Country: Iran
- Province: East Azerbaijan
- County: Bonab
- District: Central
- Rural District: Benajuy-ye Shomali

Population (2016)
  - Total: 4,539
- Time zone: UTC+3:30 (IRST)

Zavosht (Persian: زاوشت) (Note: Also romanized as Zāvosht) is a village in Benajuy-ye Shomali Rural District of the Central District in Bonab County, East Azerbaijan province, Iran.

== Demographics ==
=== Population ===
At the time of the 2006 National Census, the village's population was 3,802 in 936 households. The following census in 2011 counted 3,968 people in 1,140 households. The 2016 census measured the population of the village as 4,539 people in 1,406 households. It was the most populous village in its rural district.
