= Cherteqlu =

Village in East Azerbaijan province, Iran

Cherteqlu Persian: چرتقلو
- Village
- Location within Iran
- Coordinates: 37°22′37″N 46°48′40″E
- Country: Iran
- Province: East Azerbaijan
- County: Hashtrud
- District: Nazarkahrizi
- Rural District: Nazarkahrizi

Population (2016)
  - Total: 468
- Time zone: UTC+3:30 (IRST)

Cherteqlu (Persian: چرتقلو) (Note: Also romanized as Cherteqlū) is a village in Nazarkahrizi Rural District of Nazarkahrizi District in Hashtrud County, East Azerbaijan province, Iran.

== Demographics ==
=== Population ===
At the time of the 2006 National Census, the village's population was 593 in 113 households. The following census in 2011 counted 528 people in 144 households. The 2016 census measured the population of the village as 468 people in 138 households.
