= Joghol-e Sofla =

Joghol-e Sofla جغل سفلي
- Village
- Location within Iran
- Coordinates: 37°18′03″N 46°39′31″E
- Country: Iran
- Province: East Azerbaijan
- County: Hashtrud
- Bakhsh: Nazarkahrizi
- Rural District: Nazarkahrizi

Population (2006)
  - Total: 219
- Time zone: UTC+3:30 (IRST)
  - Summer (DST): UTC+4:30 (IRDT)

Joghol-e Sofla (Persian: جغل سفلي, also Romanized as Joghol-e Soflá) is a village in Nazarkahrizi Rural District, Nazarkahrizi District, Hashtrud County, East Azerbaijan Province, Iran. The 2006 census showed the population was 219 people, split into 47 families.
