= Shurgol, East Azerbaijan =

Village in East Azerbaijan province, Iran

Shurgol Persian: شورگل
- Village
- Location within Iran
- Coordinates: 37°25′49″N 46°01′27″E
- Country: Iran
- Province: East Azerbaijan
- County: Bonab
- District: Central
- Rural District: Benajuy-ye Shomali

Population (2016)
  - Total: 418
- Time zone: UTC+3:30 (IRST)

Shurgol (Persian: شورگل) (Note: Also romanized as Shūrgol) is a village in Benajuy-ye Shomali Rural District of the Central District in Bonab County, East Azerbaijan province, Iran.

== Demographics ==
=== Population ===
At the time of the 2006 National Census, the village's population was 516 in 110 households. The following census in 2011 counted 543 people in 148 households. The 2016 census measured the population of the village as 418 people in 124 households.
