= Yeli Daraq =

Yeli Daraq (Persian: يلي درق) may refer to:

- Yeli Daraq-e Olya
- Yeli Daraq-e Sofla
