= Sari Qayah, Hashtrud =

Village in East Azerbaijan province, Iran

Sari Qayah Persian: ساري قيه
- Village
- Location within Iran
- Coordinates: 37°23′26″N 46°46′24″E
- Country: Iran
- Province: East Azerbaijan
- County: Hashtrud
- District: Nazarkahrizi
- Rural District: Nazarkahrizi

Population (2016)
  - Total: 500
- Time zone: UTC+3:30 (IRST)

Sari Qayah (Persian: ساري قيه) (Note: Also romanized as Sārī Qayah) is a village in Nazarkahrizi Rural District of Nazarkahrizi District in Hashtrud County, East Azerbaijan province, Iran.

== Demographics ==
=== Population ===
At the time of the 2006 National Census, the village's population was 518 in 97 households. The following census in 2011 counted 531 people in 128 households. The 2016 census measured the population of the village as 500 people in 139 households. It was the most populous village in its rural district.
