= Khaneh-ye Barq-e Jadid =

Village in East Azerbaijan province, Iran

Khaneh-ye Barq-e Jadid Persian: خانه برق جديد
- Village
- Location within Iran
- Coordinates: 37°18′02″N 46°01′19″E
- Country: Iran
- Province: East Azerbaijan
- County: Bonab
- District: Central
- Rural District: Benajuy-ye Gharbi

Population (2016)
  - Total: 2,426
- Time zone: UTC+3:30 (IRST)

Khaneh-ye Barq-e Jadid (Persian: خانه برق جديد) (Note: Also romanized as Khāneh-ye Barq-e Jadīd; also known as Khāneh-ye Barq-e Mojarlū) is a village in, and the capital of, Benajuy-ye Gharbi Rural District in the Central District of Bonab County, East Azerbaijan province, Iran.

== Demographics ==
=== Population ===
At the time of the 2006 National Census, the village's population was 3,230 in 735 households. The following census in 2011 counted 3,010 people in 830 households. The 2016 census measured the population of the village as 2,426 people in 785 households.
