= Kalleh Gerd =

Village in East Azerbaijan province, Iran

Kalleh Gerd كله گرد
- Village
- Location within Iran
- Coordinates: 37°30′07″N 47°10′19″E
- Country: Iran
- Province: East Azerbaijan
- County: Hashtrud
- District: Central
- Rural District: Aliabad

Population (2016)
  - Total: 338
- Time zone: UTC+3:30 (IRST)

Kalleh Gerd (Persian: كله گرد) is a village in Aliabad Rural District of the Central District in Hashtrud County, East Azerbaijan province, Iran.

== Demographics ==
=== Population ===
At the time of the 2006 National Census, the village's population was 513 in 101 households. The following census in 2011 counted 406 people in 114 households. The 2016 census measured the population of the village as 338 people in 100 households.
