= Tup Aghaj =

Tup Aghaj or Tupaghaj or Towp Aghaj (Persian: توپاغاج) may refer to:

- Tup Aghaj, East Azerbaijan
- Tup Aghaj, Kurdistan
