= Zanjirabad =

Zanjirabad (Persian: زنجيراباد) may refer to:

- Zanjirabad, East Azerbaijan
- Zanjirabad, West Azerbaijan
