= Zarin-e Olya =

Zarin-e Olya زرين عليا
- Village
- Location within Iran
- Coordinates: 37°32′36″N 47°11′39″E
- Country: Iran
- Province: East Azerbaijan
- County: Hashtrud
- Bakhsh: Central
- Rural District: Aliabad

Population (2006)
  - Total: 36
- Time zone: UTC+3:30 (IRST)
  - Summer (DST): UTC+4:30 (IRDT)

Zarin-e Olya (Persian: زرين عليا, also Romanized as Zarīn-e ‘Olyā; also known as Zardīn-e ‘Olyā and Zardīn-e Bālā) is a village in Aliabad Rural District, in the Central District of Hashtrud County, East Azerbaijan Province, Iran. At the 2006 census, its population was 36, in 10 families.
