= Zarrin =

Zarrin (Persian: زرين) may refer to:

- Zarrin, East Azerbaijan
- Zarrin, Kohgiluyeh and Boyer-Ahmad
- Zarrin, Tehran, a mountain range south of Mount Damavand, north of Absard
- Zarrin Rural District (disambiguation)

== See also ==
- Zarin (disambiguation)
