= Atash Beyg =

Village in East Azerbaijan province, Iran

Atash Beyg Persian: اتش بيگ
- Village
- Location within Iran
- Coordinates: 37°26′10″N 46°39′21″E
- Country: Iran
- Province: East Azerbaijan
- County: Hashtrud
- District: Nazarkahrizi
- Rural District: garrango

Population (2022)
  - Total: 1,312
- Time zone: UTC+3:30 (IRST)

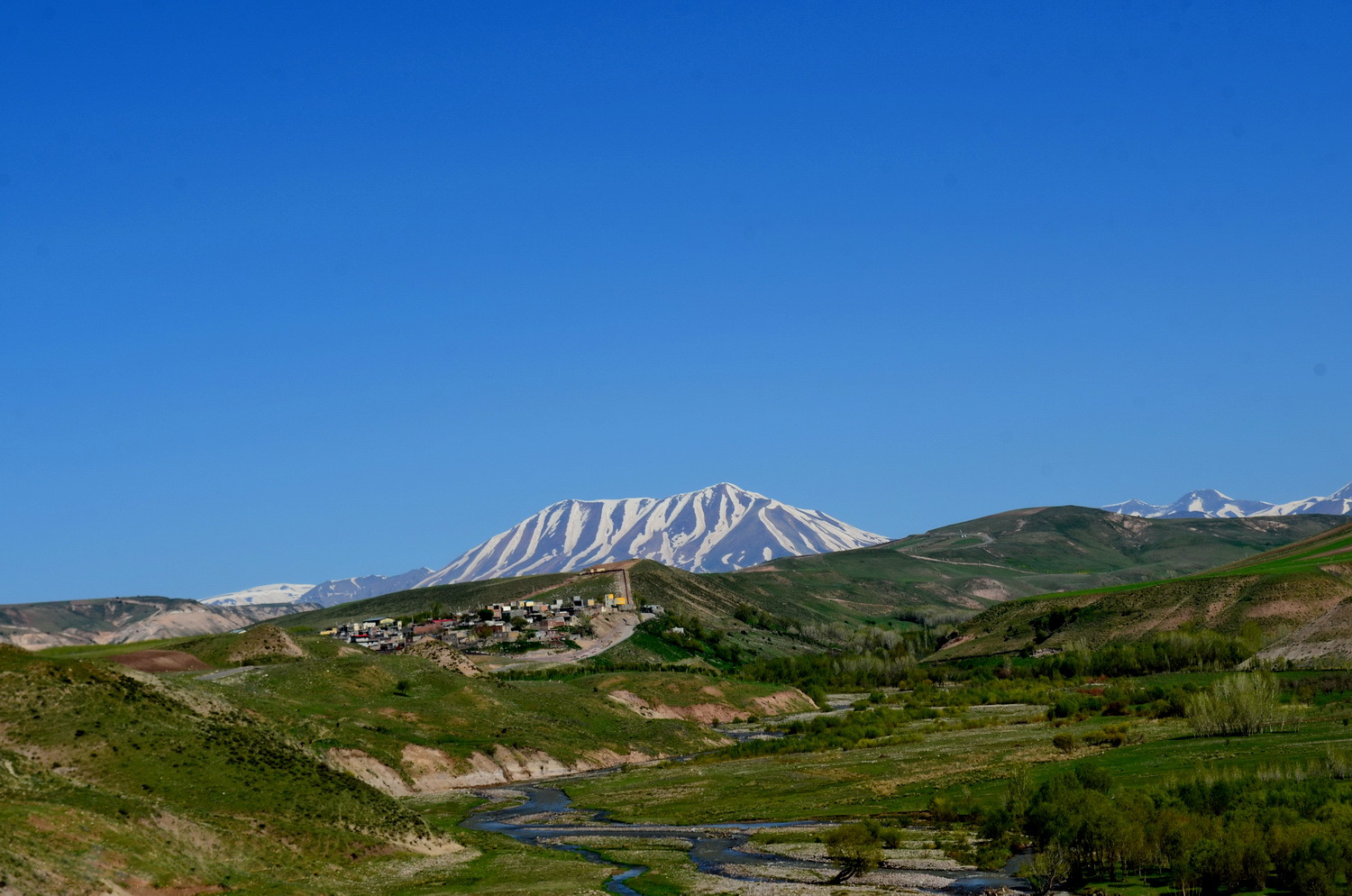
Atash Beig Hashtrood Village

Atash Beyg (Persian: اتش بيگ) (Note: Also romanized as Ātash Beyg) is a village in, and the capital of, Garrango Rural District in Nazarkahrizi District of Hashtrud County, East Azerbaijan province, Iran.

== Demographics ==
=== Population ===
At the time of the 2006 National Census, the village's population was 439 in 94 households. The following census in 2011 counted 432 people in 122 households. The 2016 census measured the population of the village as 381 people in 111 households.
