= Zarin-e Sofla =

Zarin-e Sofla زرين سفلي
- Village
- Location within Iran
- Coordinates: 37°32′15″N 47°12′16″E
- Country: Iran
- Province: East Azerbaijan
- County: Hashtrud
- Bakhsh: Central
- Rural District: Aliabad

Population (2006)
  - Total: 85
- Time zone: UTC+3:30 (IRST)
  - Summer (DST): UTC+4:30 (IRDT)

Zarin-e Sofla (Persian: زرين سفلي, also Romanized as Zarīn-e Soflá; also known as Zardīn-e Soflá and Zardīn-e Pā’īn) is a village in Aliabad Rural District, in the Central District of Hashtrud County, East Azerbaijan Province, Iran. At the 2006 census, its population was 85, in 18 families.
