= Khaneh-ye Barq-e Qadim =

Village in East Azerbaijan province, Iran

Khaneh-ye Barq-e Qadim Persian: خانه برق قديم
- Village
- Location within Iran
- Coordinates: 37°16′53″N 46°02′16″E
- Country: Iran
- Province: East Azerbaijan
- County: Bonab
- District: Central
- Rural District: Benajuy-ye Gharbi

Population (2016)
  - Total: 1,650
- Time zone: UTC+3:30 (IRST)

Khaneh-ye Barq-e Qadim (Persian: خانه برق قديم) (Note: Also romanized as Khāneh-ye Barq-e Qadīm) is a village in Benajuy-ye Gharbi Rural District of the Central District in Bonab County, East Azerbaijan province, Iran.

== Demographics ==
=== Population ===
At the time of the 2006 National Census, the village's population was 1,309 in 337 households. The following census in 2011 counted 1,306 people in 362 households. The 2016 census measured the population of the village as 1,650 people in 497 households.
