= Qeshlaq-e Khaneh-ye Barq =

Village in East Azerbaijan province, Iran

Qeshlaq-e Khaneh-ye Barq Persian: قشلاق خانه برق
- Village
- Location within Iran
- Coordinates: 37°18′08″N 46°01′00″E
- Country: Iran
- Province: East Azerbaijan
- County: Bonab
- District: Central
- Rural District: Benajuy-ye Gharbi

Population (2016)
  - Total: 1,424
- Time zone: UTC+3:30 (IRST)

Qeshlaq-e Khaneh-ye Barq (Persian: قشلاق خانه برق) (Note: Also romanized as Qeshlāq-e Khāneh-ye Barq) is a village in Benajuy-ye Gharbi Rural District of the Central District in Bonab County, East Azerbaijan province, Iran.

== Demographics ==
=== Population ===
At the time of the 2006 National Census, the village's population was 841 in 217 households. The following census in 2011 counted 915 people in 260 households. The 2016 census measured the population of the village as 1,424 people in 429 households.
