= Khorasanlu, East Azerbaijan =

Village in East Azerbaijan province, Iran

Khorasanlu خراسانلو
- Village
- Location within Iran
- Coordinates: 37°22′56″N 47°06′11″E
- Country: Iran
- Province: East Azerbaijan
- County: Hashtrud
- District: Central
- Rural District: Aliabad

Population (2016)
  - Total: 289
- Time zone: UTC+3:30 (IRST)

Khorasanlu (Persian: خراسانلو) (Note: Also romanized as Khorāsānlū; also known as Khorāsānak) is a village in Aliabad Rural District of the Central District in Hashtrud County, East Azerbaijan province, Iran.

== Demographics ==
=== Population ===
At the time of the 2006 National Census, the village's population was 352 in 88 households. The following census in 2011 counted 332 people in 96 households. The 2016 census measured the population of the village as 289 people in 86 households.

Khorasanak Station (Persian: ايستگاه خراسانك, romanized: Īstgāh-e Khorāsānak) is a separate abadi in the Iranian census to Khorasanlu covering the railway station that serves the village. At the 2006 census, its population was 138, in 35 families.
