= Dash Bolagh, Hashtrud =

Village in East Azerbaijan province, Iran

Dash Bolagh داشبلاغ
- Village
- Location within Iran
- Coordinates: 37°28′10″N 47°12′09″E
- Country: Iran
- Province: East Azerbaijan
- County: Hashtrud
- District: Central
- Rural District: Aliabad

Population (2016)
  - Total: 335
- Time zone: UTC+3:30 (IRST)

Dash Bolagh (Persian: داشبلاغ) (Note: Also romanized as Dāsh Bolāgh) is a village in, and the former capital of, Aliabad Rural District in the Central District of Hashtrud County, East Azerbaijan province, Iran. The capital of the rural district has been transferred to the village of Aliabad-e Olya.

== Demographics ==
=== Population ===
At the time of the 2006 National Census, the village's population was 448 in 91 households. The following census in 2011 counted 441 people in 119 households. The 2016 census measured the population of the village as 335 people in 100 households.
