= Qareh Zeki =

Qareh Zeki or Qarah Zaki (Persian: Persian: قره زكي) may refer to:

- Qarah Zaki, East Azerbaijan
- Qareh Zeki, Zanjan
