= Tup Aghaj, East Azerbaijan =

Village in East Azerbaijan province, Iran

Tup Aghaj Persian: توپاغاج
- Village
- Location within Iran
- Coordinates: 37°26′13″N 46°37′34″E
- Country: Iran
- Province: East Azerbaijan
- County: Hashtrud
- District: Nazarkahrizi
- Rural District: Almalu

Population (2016)
  - Total: 299
- Time zone: UTC+3:30 (IRST)

Tup Aghaj (Persian: توپاغاج) (Note: Also romanized as Towp Āghāj and Tūp Āghāj; also known as Tūp Āqāj) is a village in Almalu Rural District of Nazarkahrizi District in Hashtrud County, East Azerbaijan province, Iran.

== Demographics ==
=== Population ===
At the time of the 2006 National Census, the village's population was 302 in 61 households. The following census in 2011 counted 259 people in 66 households. The 2016 census measured the population of the village as 299 people in 76 households.
