= Yengikand-e Khaneh-ye Barq =

Village in East Azerbaijan province, Iran

Yengikand-e Khaneh-ye Barq Persian: ينگي كندخانه برق
- Village
- Location within Iran
- Coordinates: 37°18′24″N 46°01′25″E
- Country: Iran
- Province: East Azerbaijan
- County: Bonab
- District: Central
- Rural District: Benajuy-ye Gharbi

Population (2016)
  - Total: 1,366
- Time zone: UTC+3:30 (IRST)

Yengikand-e Khaneh-ye Barq (Persian: ينگي كندخانه برق) (Note: Also romanized as Yengīkand-e Khāneh-ye Barq) is a village in Benajuy-ye Gharbi Rural District of the Central District in Bonab County, East Azerbaijan province, Iran.

== Demographics ==
=== Population ===
At the time of the 2006 National Census, the village's population was 853 in 208 households. The following census in 2011 counted 764 people in 207 households. The 2016 census measured the population of the village as 1,366 people in 428 households.
