= Dush, Iran =

Village in East Azerbaijan province, Iran

Dush Persian: دوش
- Village
- Location within Iran
- Coordinates: 37°23′18″N 46°08′14″E
- Country: Iran
- Province: East Azerbaijan
- County: Bonab
- District: Central
- Rural District: Benajuy-ye Shomali

Population (2016)
  - Total: 1,003
- Time zone: UTC+3:30 (IRST)

Dush (Persian: دوش) (Note: Also romanized as Dūsh) is a village in Benajuy-ye Shomali Rural District of the Central District in Bonab County, East Azerbaijan province, Iran.

== Demographics ==
=== Population ===
At the time of the 2006 National Census, the village's population was 924 in 203 households. The following census in 2011 counted 894 people in 231 households. The 2016 census measured the population of the village as 1,003 people in 321 households.
