= Aliabad-e Olya, East Azerbaijan =

Village in East Azerbaijan province, Iran

Aliabad-e Olya علی‌آباد علیا
- Village
- Location within Iran
- Coordinates: 37°27′13″N 47°05′48″E
- Country: Iran
- Province: East Azerbaijan
- County: Hashtrud
- District: Central
- Rural District: Aliabad

Population (2016)
  - Total: 825
- Time zone: UTC+3:30 (IRST)

Aliabad-e Olya (Persian: علی‌آباد علیا) (Note: Also romanized as ‘Alīābād-e ‘Olyā; also known as ‘Alīābād-e Bālā) is a village in, and the capital of, Aliabad Rural District in the Central District of Hashtrud County, East Azerbaijan province, Iran. The previous capital of the rural district was the village of Dash Bolagh.

== Demographics ==
=== Population ===
At the time of the 2006 National Census, the village's population was 885 in 204 households. The following census in 2011 counted 862 people in 208 households. The 2016 census measured the population of the village as 825 people in 249 households. It was the most populous village in its rural district.
