= Basit, Hashtrud =

Village in East Azerbaijan province, Iran

Basit Persian: بسيط
- Village
- Location within Iran
- Coordinates: 37°27′47″N 46°36′55″E
- Country: Iran
- Province: East Azerbaijan
- County: Hashtrud
- District: Nazarkahrizi
- Rural District: Almalu

Population (2016)
  - Total: 599
- Time zone: UTC+3:30 (IRST)

Basit (Persian: بسيط) (Note: Also romanized as Basīţ) is a village in Almalu Rural District of Nazarkahrizi District in Hashtrud County, East Azerbaijan province, Iran.

== Demographics ==
=== Population ===
At the time of the 2006 National Census, the village's population was 508 in 78 households. The following census in 2011 counted 528 people in 149 households. The 2016 census measured the population of the village as 599 people in 166 households. It was the most populous village in its rural district.
