= Dushi =

Dushi may refer to:

- Dushi, Albania, also known as Dush, Albania, a town in Shkodër County, Albania
- Dushi, Afghanistan, a town in Baghlan Province Afghanistan
  - Dushi District, an administrative district in Baghlan Province Afghanistan
- Dushi, Chongqing, a town in Jiangjin District, Chongqing, China
- Dushi, Jiangxi, a town in Fengcheng, Jiangxi, China
- Dushi, Nigeria, a village in northern Nigeria, 12.0167°N 7.9500°E
- Ledia Dushi (born 1978), Albanian writer and academic
