= Qorban Kandi =

Qorban Kandi (Persian: قربان كندي) may refer to:

- Qorban Kandi, Hashtrud, East Azerbaijan Province
- Qorban Kandi, Malekan, East Azerbaijan Province
- Qorban Kandi, West Azerbaijan
