= Nazarkahrizi =

City in East Azerbaijan province, Iran

Nazarkahrizi Persian: نظركهريزئ
- City
- Location within Iran
- Coordinates: 37°20′49″N 46°45′49″E
- Country: Iran
- Province: East Azerbaijan
- County: Hashtrud
- District: Nazarkahrizi
- Established as a city: 2004

Population (2016)
  - Total: 1,215
- Time zone: UTC+3:30 (IRST)

Nazarkahrizi (Persian: نظركهريزئ) (Note: Also romanized as Nazar Kahrīzī and Nazarkahrīzī; also known as Nazar Kahrīz) is a city in, and the capital of, Nazarkahrizi District in Hashtrud County, East Azerbaijan province, Iran. It also serves as the administrative center for Nazarkahrizi Rural District. The village of Nazarkahrizi was converted to a city in 2004.

== Demographics ==
=== Population ===
At the time of the 2006 National Census, the city's population was 1,181 in 227 households. The following census in 2011 counted 1,266 people in 269 households. The 2016 census measured the population of the city as 1,215 people in 348 households.
