= Khusheh Mehr =

City in East Azerbaijan province, Iran

Khusheh Mehr Persian: خوشه مهر
- City
- Location within Iran
- Coordinates: 37°18′34″N 46°08′25″E
- Country: Iran
- Province: East Azerbaijan
- County: Bonab
- District: Central
- Established as a city: 2018

Population (2016)
  - Total: 3,528
- Time zone: UTC+3:30 (IRST)

Khusheh Mehr (Persian: خوشه مهر) (Note: Also romanized as Khūsheh Mehr; also known as Khojamir, Khūsheh Mehr-e Khūjeh Mīr, Khūshmehr, Khvājeh Āmīr (خواجه امي), and Kūsheh Mehr) is a city in the Central District of Bonab County, East Azerbaijan province, Iran. As a village, it was the capital of Benajuy-ye Sharqi Rural District until its capital was transferred to the village of Chelqai.

== Demographics ==
=== Population ===
At the time of the 2006 National Census, Khusheh Mehr's population was 3,633 in 882 households, when it was a village in Benajuy-ye Sharqi Rural District. The following census in 2011 counted 3,738 people in 1,086 households. The 2016 census measured the population of the village as 3,528 people in 1,071 households. It was the most populous village in its rural district.

Khusheh Mehr was converted to a city in 2018.
