= Bonab kababi =

- Alternative names: Bonab kebab, Binab kababi
- Type: Kebab
- Place of origin: Iran
- Region or state: Bonab, East Azerbaijan province
- Main ingredients: Mutton, onion, salt
- Ingredients generally used: Black pepper
- Similar dishes: Kabab koobideh

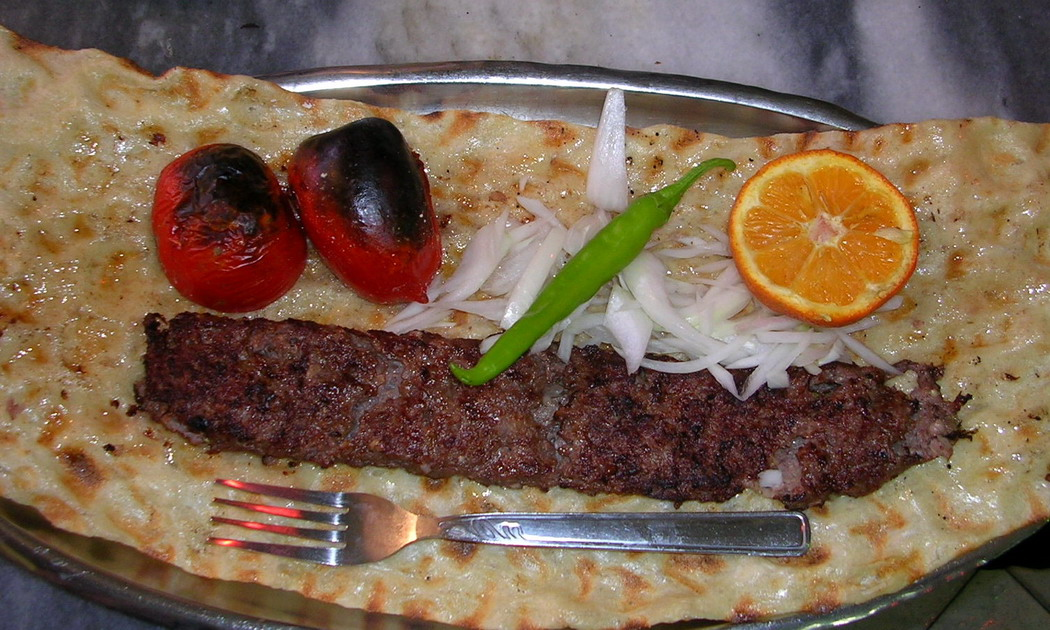
Bonab kabab with sangak bread, tomato, onion, green chili pepper, and sour orange

Bonab kabab (South Azerbaijani: بوناب کاباب, Persian: کباب بُناب) is a type of kebab that is made of ground mutton, onion, and salt. It is named after the city of Bonab in the region of Azerbaijan in northwestern Iran, where it is originated from, and is famous for its large size.

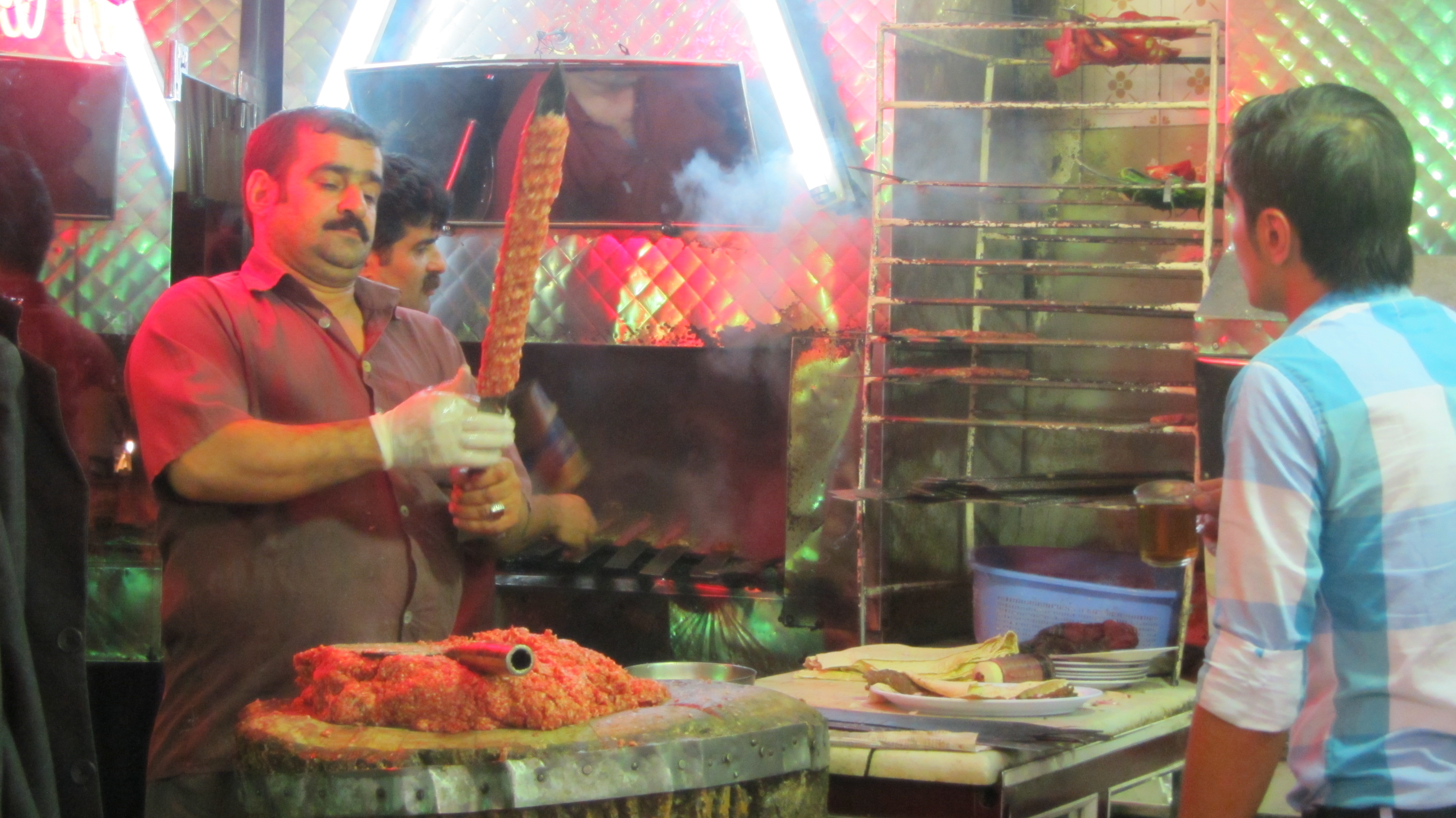
Bonab kabab

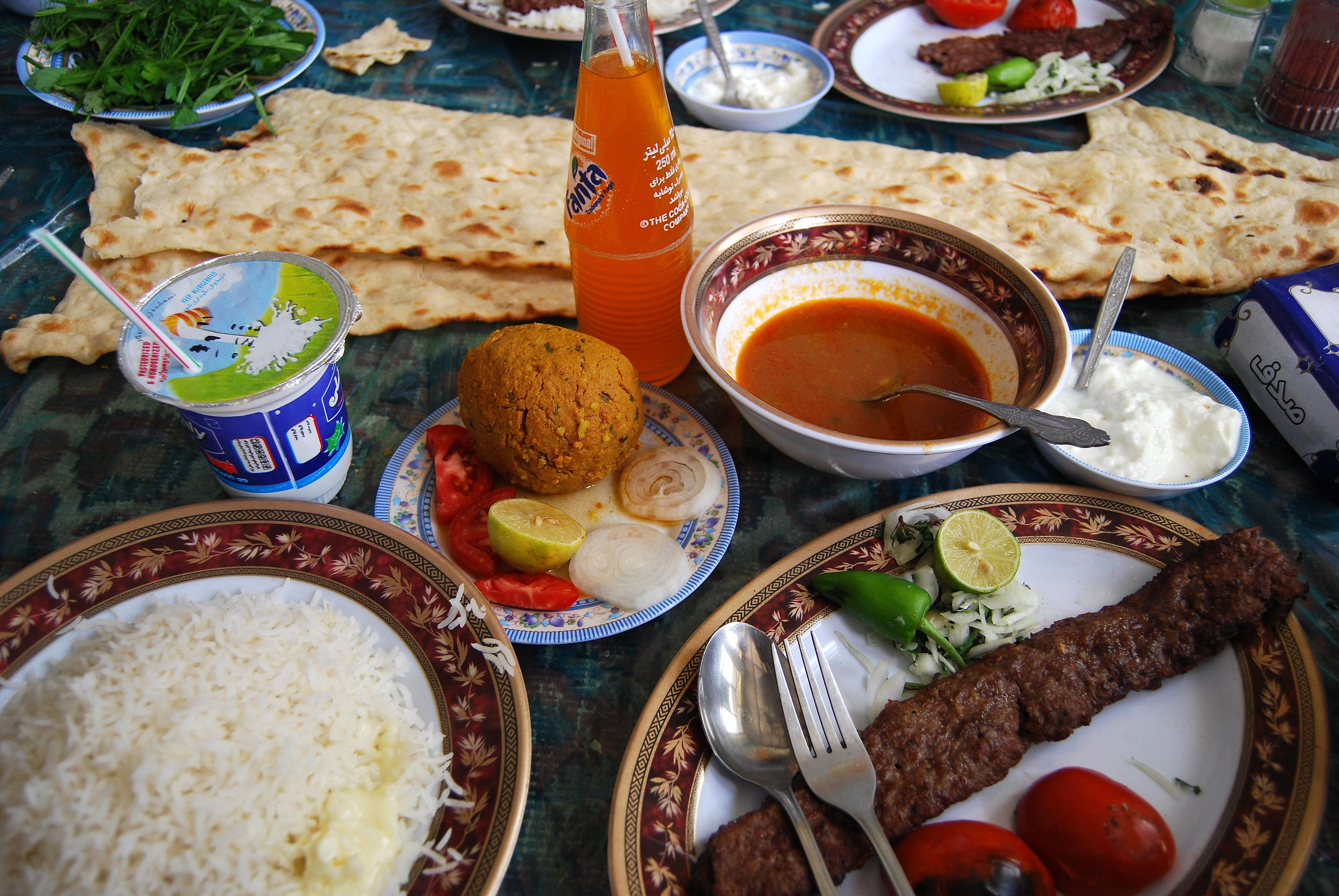
Bonab kabab (bottom-right corner) and other Iranian Azerbaijani dishes.
