= Zariņš =

Family name

Origin
- Origin: Latvian
- Meaning: "little branch/twig"

Other names
- Variant form: Zarin

Zariņš (feminine: Zariņa) is a Latvian language surname, derived from the Latvian word for "branch" or "twig" (zars). Individuals with the surname include:

- Christopher Zariņš (born 1943), Latvian-American surgeon
- Ivars Zariņš (born 1969), Latvian politician
- Juris Zarins (1945-2023), American archaeologist
- Kārlis Zariņš (writer) (1889–1978), Latvian writer
- Kārlis Reinholds Zariņš (1879–1963), Latvian diplomat
- Marģeris Zariņš (1910–1993), Latvian composer and writer
- Rihards Zariņš (1869–1939), Latvian graphic artist

== See also ==
- Zarin (disambiguation)
