= Hasan Kandi Rud =

Village in East Azerbaijan province, Iran

Hasan Kandi Rud حسن كندي رود
- Village
- Location within Iran
- Coordinates: 37°25′26″N 47°13′50″E
- Country: Iran
- Province: East Azerbaijan
- County: Hashtrud
- District: Central
- Rural District: Aliabad

Population (2016)
  - Total: 705
- Time zone: UTC+3:30 (IRST)

Hasan Kandi Rud (Persian: حسن كندي رود) (Note: Also romanized as Ḩasan Kandī Rūd; also known as Ḩasan Kandī and Ḩasan Kandī Hashtrūd (حسن کندي هشترود)) is a village in Aliabad Rural District of the Central District in Hashtrud County, East Azerbaijan province, Iran.

== Demographics ==
=== Population ===
At the time of the 2006 National Census, the village's population was 883 in 220 households. The following census in 2011 counted 763 people in 240 households. The 2016 census measured the population of the village as 705 people in 243 households.
