= Bonab =

City in East Azerbaijan province, Iran

Bonab Persian: بناب
- City
- Location within Iran
- Coordinates: 37°20′18″N 46°03′14″E
- Country: Iran
- Province: East Azerbaijan
- County: Bonab
- District: Central

Population (2016)
  - Total: 85,274
- Time zone: UTC+3:30 (IRST)

Bonab (Persian: بناب) (Note: Also Romanized as Benāb and Bonāb; also known as Bināb, Binev, Binov, and Bunab; and Azerbaijani: Binab) is a city in the Central District of Bonab County, East Azerbaijan province, Iran, serving as capital of both the county and the district. Bonab is 120 km south of Tabriz (the capital of the province), near Lake Urmia. The city is 150 kilometers from Piranshahr, 270 kilometers from Khalkhal, 350 kilometers from Abhar and 450 kilometers from Parsabad.

== History ==
Based on the archaeological signs found in old Bonab city explorations, the history of this city dates back six thousand years. Also the discovery of old earthenware and metal ware and signs of urban civilization prove this ancient history. Bonab has 25 registered historical monuments on the list of Iran's national monuments, out of which, 8 are under protection.

There are human-built remains from Urartu Civilization in the Savar Village near Bonab which dates back to 700 BC and Iron Age. Also, Bonab became very prosperous during the Safavid era and the traditional theme of architecture in Bonab pertains to this era.

Iranian archeologists hope a newly discovered tunnel in Bonab, northwest of Iran, is likely to lead them to the legendary city of Shiz, dating back to 7,000 years ago. Shiz is believed to have been one of the most prosperous cities in ancient Persia and historical documents indicate it housed over ten thousands people during its booming days. Experts cannot, however, agree on the geographical location of the city, which is believed to have been older than Susa, southwest of Iran.

== Demographics ==
=== Language and ethnicity ===
The majority of the population of Bonab speak Azerbaijani and are ethnically Azerbaijanis.

=== Population ===
At the time of the 2006 National Census, the city's population was 75,332 in 19,922 households. The following census in 2011 counted 79,894 people in 23,174 households. The 2016 census measured the population of the city as 85,274 people in 26,916 households.

== Geography ==
=== Location ===
Bonab city is on the slopes of Sahand Mountain and in the fertile plains. Handicraft production is seasonal, taking place mostly in rural areas. There are 500 important production and industrial units in this area. They include machine tool and vehicle factories, an oil refinery, and a petrochemical complex. Other major Industries include food processing, cement, textiles, electrical equipment, and sugar milling. Oil and gas pipelines run through the region. Wool, carpets, and metal-ware are also produced.

=== Climate ===
Bonab has a cold semi-arid climate (Köppen climate classification BSk), with an average annual temperature of 11.6 °C. The warmest month, on average, is July with an average temperature of 77.2 °F (25.1 °C). The coolest month on average is January, with an average temperature of 26.8 °F (−2.9 °C).

Climate data for Bonab Elevation:1290.0m (1999-2005)
Month	Jan	Feb	Mar	Apr	May	Jun	Jul	Aug	Sep	Oct	Nov	Dec	Year
Mean daily maximum °C (°F)	5.1 (41.2)	7.4 (45.3)	13.7 (56.7)	18.7 (65.7)	23.9 (75.0)	30.0 (86.0)	33.6 (92.5)	33.9 (93.0)	29.5 (85.1)	22.8 (73.0)	12.7 (54.9)	7.1 (44.8)	19.9 (67.8)
Daily mean °C (°F)	0.6 (33.1)	2.1 (35.8)	7.3 (45.1)	12.5 (54.5)	16.9 (62.4)	22.2 (72.0)	26.6 (79.9)	26.5 (79.7)	21.5 (70.7)	15.3 (59.5)	7.0 (44.6)	2.4 (36.3)	13.4 (56.1)
Mean daily minimum °C (°F)	−3.9 (25.0)	−3.2 (26.2)	1.0 (33.8)	6.3 (43.3)	9.8 (49.6)	14.3 (57.7)	19.7 (67.5)	19.1 (66.4)	13.4 (56.1)	7.8 (46.0)	1.3 (34.3)	−2.3 (27.9)	6.9 (44.5)
Average precipitation mm (inches)	30.5 (1.20)	17.1 (0.67)	29.5 (1.16)	68.8 (2.71)	25.9 (1.02)	4.3 (0.17)	5.1 (0.20)	0.6 (0.02)	0.8 (0.03)	6.0 (0.24)	35.9 (1.41)	26.4 (1.04)	250.9 (9.87)
Average relative humidity (%)	72	63	51	50	44	34	33	33	34	43	62	70	49
Average dew point °C (°F)	−3.9 (25.0)	−4.0 (24.8)	−1.8 (28.8)	2.8 (37.0)	5.3 (41.5)	6.9 (44.4)	9.6 (49.3)	9.5 (49.1)	5.5 (41.9)	3.1 (37.6)	0.3 (32.5)	−2.5 (27.5)	2.6 (36.6)
Source: IRIMO(Temperatures)(Precipitation) (humidity and Dew Point)

== Infrastructure ==
Bonab city has the only nuclear research center in the northwest of the country; it was here that the laser ion argon 10 was first produced in the Middle East. Some of the activities of this center are: laser construction and design, thyratron production, advanced metal welding to non-metal, thermal sensors manufacturing, making X-ray tube, and optimization of nylon vacuum coating system.

Bonab plays a major role in the economy of East Azerbaijan province as it is home to several steel factories and many other small and large manufacturing plants. Geographically, it plays a strategic role in connecting the cities of Tabriz, Maragheh, Urmia, Miandoab and Malekan. Bonab is also famous for its traditional Bonab kabab, which is a type of mixed ground beef and lamb Kabab.

== National Kabab Festival ==
Bonab is famous for its big Kabab koobideh. Nowadays there are many restaurants around Iran that started serving the same recipe of Bonab kabab. Bonab's kabab was registered as National Intangible Cultural Heritage of Iran in 2015 and since then, every year in July Iran's National Kabab Festival is held in Bonab.

== Colleges and universities ==
- Bonab Higher Education Complex
- Islamic Azad University of Bonab
- Payame Noor University of Bonab

== See also ==
Media related to Bonab at Wikimedia Commons
