= Hasan Kandi, Chaldoran =

Hasan Kandi حسن كندي
- Village
- Location within Iran
- Coordinates: 39°02′19″N 44°41′43″E
- Country: Iran
- Province: West Azerbaijan
- County: Chaldoran
- Bakhsh: Central
- Rural District: Baba Jik

Population (2006)
  - Total: 41
- Time zone: UTC+3:30 (IRST)
  - Summer (DST): UTC+4:30 (IRDT)

Hasan Kandi (Persian: حسن كندي, also Romanized as Ḩasan Kandī) is a village in Baba Jik Rural District, in the Central District of Chaldoran County, West Azerbaijan Province, Iran. At the 2006 census, its population was 41, in 7 families.
