= Dushmian =

Dushmian دوشميان
- Village
- Location within Iran
- Coordinates: 34°33′45″N 46°14′39″E
- Country: Iran
- Province: Kermanshah
- County: Dalahu
- Bakhsh: Gahvareh
- Rural District: Qalkhani

Population (2006)
  - Total: 660
- Time zone: UTC+3:30 (IRST)
  - Summer (DST): UTC+4:30 (IRDT)

Dushmian (Persian: دوشميان, also Romanized as Dūshmīān and Dūsh-e Mīān) is a village in Qalkhani Rural District, Gahvareh District, Dalahu County, Kermanshah Province, Iran. At the 2006 census, its population was 660, in 123 families.
