= Benajuy-ye Sharqi Rural District =

Rural district in East Azerbaijan province, Iran

Benajuy-ye Sharqi Rural District Persian: دهستان بناجوئ شرقي
- Rural District
- Location within Iran
- Coordinates: 37°17′N 46°08′E
- Country: Iran
- Province: East Azerbaijan
- County: Bonab
- District: Central
- Established: 1987
- Capital: Chelqai

Population (2016)
  - Total: 10,290
- Time zone: UTC+3:30 (IRST)

Benajuy-ye Sharqi Rural District (Persian: دهستان بناجوئ شرقي) is in the Central District of Bonab County, East Azerbaijan province, Iran. Its capital is the village of Chelqai. The previous capital of the rural district was the village of Khusheh Mehr, now a city.

== Demographics ==
=== Population ===
At the time of the 2006 National Census, the rural district's population was 12,179 in 2,934 households. There were 11,955 inhabitants in 3,455 households at the following census of 2011. The 2016 census measured the population of the rural district as 10,290 in 3,300 households. The most populous of its five villages was Khusheh Mehr (now a city), with 3,528 people.

=== Other villages in the rural district ===
- Dizaj-e Parvaneh
- Tazeh Kand-e Khusheh Mehr
- Yengikand-e Khusheh Mehr
