= Qarqa, Sarab =

Qarqa قارقا
- Village
- Location within Iran
- Coordinates: 37°12′14″N 46°45′25″E
- Country: Iran
- Province: East Azerbaijan
- County: Sarab
- Bakhsh: Central
- Rural District: Abarghan

Population (2006)
  - Total: 398
- Time zone: UTC+3:30 (IRST)
  - Summer (DST): UTC+4:30 (IRDT)

Qarqa (Persian: قارقا, also Romanized as Qārqā) is a village in Abarghan Rural District, in the Central District of Sarab County, East Azerbaijan Province, Iran. At the 2006 census, its population was 398, in 73 families.
