= Idahlu, Kurdistan =

Idahlu ايده لو
- Village
- Location within Iran
- Coordinates: 35°58′34″N 47°57′35″E
- Country: Iran
- Province: Kurdistan
- County: Bijar
- Bakhsh: Central
- Rural District: Khvor Khvoreh

Population (2006)
  - Total: 237
- Time zone: UTC+3:30 (IRST)
  - Summer (DST): UTC+4:30 (IRDT)

Idahlu (Persian: ايده لو, also Romanized as Īdahlū, Eydehlū, Idahlū, Idehloo, and Īdehlū; also known as Eydlū and Īdalu) is a village in Khvor Khvoreh Rural District, in the Central District of Bijar County, Kurdistan Province, Iran. At the 2006 census, its population was 237, in 47 families. The village is populated by Azerbaijanis.
