= Basit, Meyaneh =

Basit بسيط
- Village
- Location within Iran
- Coordinates: 37°47′18″N 48°01′10″E
- Country: Iran
- Province: East Azerbaijan
- County: Meyaneh
- Bakhsh: Kandovan
- Rural District: Garmeh-ye Shomali

Population (2006)
  - Total: 29
- Time zone: UTC+3:30 (IRST)
  - Summer (DST): UTC+4:30 (IRDT)

Basit (Persian: بسيط, also romanized as Basīţ) is a village in Garmeh-ye Shomali Rural District, Kandovan District, Meyaneh County, East Azerbaijan Province, Iran. At the 2006 census, its population was 29, in 5 families.
