= Zarin, Iran =

Zarin زارين
- Village
- Location within Iran
- Coordinates: 28°53′43″N 57°48′18″E
- Country: Iran
- Province: Kerman
- County: Jiroft
- Bakhsh: Jebalbarez
- Rural District: Saghder

Population (2006)
  - Total: 85
- Time zone: UTC+3:30 (IRST)
  - Summer (DST): UTC+4:30 (IRDT)

Zarin (Persian: زارين, also Romanized as Zārīn) is a village in Saghder Rural District, Jebalbarez District, Jiroft County, Kerman Province, Iran. At the 2006 census, its population was 85, in 22 families.
