= Zarrin Rural District =

Zarrin Rural District (Persian: دهستان زرين) may refer to:

- Zarrin Rural District (Saman County), Chaharmahal and Bakhtiari province
- Zarrin Rural District (Joveyn County), Razavi Khorasan province
- Zarrin Rural District (Ardakan County), Yazd province

== See also ==
- Zarrin Gol Rural District
