= Yaleh Qarshow, Meyaneh =

Yaleh Qarshow يله قارشو
- Village
- Location within Iran
- Coordinates: 37°33′48″N 47°59′30″E
- Country: Iran
- Province: East Azerbaijan
- County: Meyaneh
- Bakhsh: Central
- Rural District: Garmeh-ye Jonubi

Population (2006)
  - Total: 242
- Time zone: UTC+3:30 (IRST)

Yaleh Qarshow (Persian: يله قارشو, also Romanized as Yaleh Qārshow, Yelah Qārshū, Yelehqārshow, and Yeleh Qārshū) is a village in Garmeh-ye Jonubi Rural District, in the Central District of Meyaneh County, East Azerbaijan Province, Iran. At the 2006 census, its population was 242, in 49 families.
