= Soleyman Kandi, Kurdistan =

Soleyman Kandi سليمان كندي
- Village
- Location within Iran
- Coordinates: 36°20′47″N 46°19′36″E
- Country: Iran
- Province: Kurdistan
- County: Saqqez
- Bakhsh: Central
- Rural District: Sara

Population (1006)
  - Total: 370
- Time zone: UTC+3:30 (IRST)
  - Summer (DST): UTC+4:30 (IRDT)

Soleyman Kandi (Persian: سليمان كندي, also Romanized as Soleymān Kandī) is a village in Sara Rural District, in the Central District of Saqqez County, Kurdistan Province, Iran. At the 2006 census, its population was 370, in 79 families. The village is populated by Kurds.
