= Zarrin Dowtu =

Zarrin Dowtu زرين دوتو
- Village
- Location within Iran
- Coordinates: 31°23′17″N 50°35′47″E
- Country: Iran
- Province: Kohgiluyeh and Boyer-Ahmad
- County: Boyer-Ahmad
- Bakhsh: Margown
- Rural District: Zilayi

Population (2006)
  - Total: 53
- Time zone: UTC+3:30 (IRST)
  - Summer (DST): UTC+4:30 (IRDT)

Zarrin Dowtu (Persian: زرين دوتو, also Romanized as Zarrīn Dowtū; also known as Zarrīn) is a village in Zilayi Rural District, Margown District, Boyer-Ahmad County, Kohgiluyeh and Boyer-Ahmad Province, Iran. At the 2006 census, its population was 53, in 12 families.
