= Yelah Qarshu, Bostanabad =

Yelah Qarshu يله قارشو
- Village
- Location within Iran
- Coordinates: 37°36′13″N 47°08′28″E
- Country: Iran
- Province: East Azerbaijan
- County: Bostanabad
- Bakhsh: Tekmeh Dash
- Rural District: Abbas-e Sharqi

Population (2006)
  - Total: 150
- Time zone: UTC+3:30 (IRST)
  - Summer (DST): UTC+4:30 (IRDT)

Yelah Qarshu (Persian: يله قارشو, also Romanized as Yelah Qarshū) is a village in Abbas-e Sharqi Rural District, Tekmeh Dash District, Bostanabad County, East Azerbaijan Province, Iran. At the 2006 census, its population was 150, in 41 families.
