= Idehlu, Sarab =

Idehlu ايده لو
- Village
- Location within Iran
- Coordinates: 38°01′19″N 47°46′08″E
- Country: Iran
- Province: East Azerbaijan
- County: Sarab
- Bakhsh: Central
- Rural District: Sain

Population (2006)
  - Total: 278
- Time zone: UTC+3:30 (IRST)
  - Summer (DST): UTC+4:30 (IRDT)

Idehlu (Persian: ايده لو, also Romanized as Īdehlū; also known as Īdelū) is a village in Sain Rural District, in the Central District of Sarab County, East Azerbaijan Province, Iran. At the 2006 census, its population was 278, in 50 families.
