= Dush, Albania =

Dush
- Village
- Location within Albania
- Coordinates: 42°02′33″N 19°48′12″E
- Country: Albania
- County: Shkodër
- Municipality: Pukë
- Administrative unit: Qerret
- Time zone: UTC+1 (CET)
  - Summer (DST): UTC+2 (CEST)

Dush (also known as Dushi, Dusi-Eper, and Dushi i Epërmë) is a village in the former Qerret municipality, Shkodër County, northern Albania. At the 2015 local government reform it became part of the municipality Pukë.
