= Benajuy-ye Gharbi Rural District =

Rural district in East Azerbaijan province, Iran

Benajuy-ye Gharbi Rural District Persian: دهستان بناجوئ غربي
- Rural District
- Location within Iran
- Coordinates: 37°17′N 45°52′E
- Country: Iran
- Province: East Azerbaijan
- County: Bonab
- District: Central
- Established: 1987
- Capital: Khaneh-ye Barq-e Jadid

Population (2016)
  - Total: 27,066
- Time zone: UTC+3:30 (IRST)

Benajuy-ye Gharbi Rural District (Persian: دهستان بناجوئ غربي) is in the Central District of Bonab County, East Azerbaijan province, Iran. Its capital is the village of Khaneh-ye Barq-e Jadid.

== Demographics ==
=== Population ===
At the time of the 2006 National Census, the rural district's population was 25,612 in 6,267 households. There were 26,062 inhabitants in 7,377 households at the following census of 2011. The 2016 census measured the population of the rural district as 27,066 in 8,281 households. The most populous of its 14 villages was Qarah Chopoq, with 5,456 people.

=== Other villages in the rural district ===
- Akhund Qeshlaq
- Ali Khvajeh
- Chopoqlu
- Khalilvand
- Khaneh-ye Barq-e Qadim
- Qareh Qeshlaq
- Qeshlaq-e Khaneh-ye Barq
- Yengikand-e Khaneh-ye Barq
- Zavaraq
