= Benajuy-ye Shomali Rural District =

Rural district in East Azerbaijan province, Iran

Benajuy-ye Shomali Rural District Persian: دهستان بناجوئ شمالي
- Rural District
- Location within Iran
- Coordinates: 37°26′N 46°05′E
- Country: Iran
- Province: East Azerbaijan
- County: Bonab
- District: Central
- Established: 1987
- Capital: Ravesht-e Bozorg

Population (2016)
  - Total: 12,262
- Time zone: UTC+3:30 (IRST)

Benajuy-ye Shomali Rural District (Persian: دهستان بناجوئ شمالي) is in the Central District of Bonab County, East Azerbaijan province, Iran. Its capital is the village of Ravesht-e Bozorg.

== Demographics ==
=== Population ===
At the time of the 2006 National Census, the rural district's population was 12,086 in 2,798 households. There were 11,884 inhabitants in 3,374 households at the following census of 2011. The 2016 census measured the population of the rural district as 12,262 in 3,828 households. The most populous of its 11 villages was Zavosht, with 4,539 people.

=== Other villages in the rural district ===
- Alqu
- Dush
- Ravesht-e Kuchek
- Shurgol
- Tutah Khaneh
