= Aliabad Rural District (Hashtrud County) =

Rural district in East Azerbaijan province, Iran

Aliabad Rural District دهستان علی‌آباد
- Rural District
- Location within Iran
- Coordinates: 37°28′N 47°11′E
- Country: Iran
- Province: East Azerbaijan
- County: Hashtrud
- District: Central
- Established: 1987
- Capital: Aliabad-e Olya

Population (2016)
  - Total: 4,320
- Time zone: UTC+3:30 (IRST)

Aliabad Rural District (Persian: دهستان علی‌آباد) is in the Central District of Hashtrud County, East Azerbaijan province, Iran. Its capital is the village of Aliabad-e Olya. The previous capital of the rural district was the village of Dash Bolagh.

== Demographics ==
=== Population ===
At the time of the 2006 National Census, the rural district's population was 5,595 in 1,231 households. There were 4,923 inhabitants in 1,312 households at the following census of 2011. The 2016 census measured the population of the rural district as 4,320 in 1,305 households. The most populous of its 22 villages was Aliabad-e Olya, with 825 people.

=== Other villages in the rural district ===
- Aliabad-e Sofla
- Hasan Kandi Rud
- Kalleh Gerd
- Khorasanlu
