= Almalu Rural District =

Rural district in East Azerbaijan province, Iran

Almalu Rural District Persian: دهستان آلمالو
- Rural District
- Location within Iran
- Coordinates: 37°30′N 46°37′E
- Country: Iran
- Province: East Azerbaijan
- County: Hashtrud
- District: Nazarkahrizi
- Established: 1987
- Capital: Atash Beyg

Population (2016)
  - Total: 5,445
- Time zone: UTC+3:30 (IRST)

Almalu Rural District (Persian: دهستان آلمالو) is in Nazarkahrizi District of Hashtrud County, East Azerbaijan province, Iran. Its capital is the village of Atash Beyg.

== Demographics ==
=== Population ===
At the time of the 2006 National Census, the rural district's population was 6,561 in 1,171 households. There were 5,635 inhabitants in 1,515 households at the following census of 2011. The 2016 census measured the population of the rural district as 5,445 in 1,597 households. The most populous of its 38 villages was Basit, with 599 people.

=== Other villages in the rural district ===
- Nokhvodabad
- Pasha Beyg
- Qarah Kalak
- Tup Aghaj
