= Central District (Bonab County) =

District in East Azerbaijan province, Iran

Central District (Bonab County) Persian: بخش مرکزی شهرستان بناب
- District
- Location within Iran
- Coordinates: 37°21′N 45°55′E
- Country: Iran
- Province: East Azerbaijan
- County: Bonab
- Capital: Bonab

Population (2016)
  - Total: 134,892
- Time zone: UTC+3:30 (IRST)

The Central District of Bonab County (Persian: بخش مرکزی شهرستان بناب) is in East Azerbaijan province, Iran. Its capital is the city of Bonab.

== History ==
The village of Khusheh Mehr was converted to a city in 2018.

== Demographics ==
=== Population ===
At the time of the 2006 National Census, the district's population was 125,209 in 31,921 households. The following census in 2011 counted 129,795 people in 37,353 households. The 2016 census measured the population of the district as 134,892 inhabitants living in 42,325 households.

=== Administrative divisions ===
Central District (Bonab County) Population
Administrative Divisions	2006	2011	2016
Benajuy-ye Gharbi RD	25,612	26,062	27,066
Benajuy-ye Sharqi RD	12,179	11,955	10,290
Benajuy-ye Shomali RD	12,086	11,884	12,262
Bonab (city)	75,332	79,894	85,274
Khusheh Mehr (city) (Note: Became a city after the 2016 census)			
Total	125,209	129,795	134,892
RD = Rural District
