= Bonab County =

County in East Azerbaijan province, Iran

Bonab County Persian: شهرستان بناب
- County
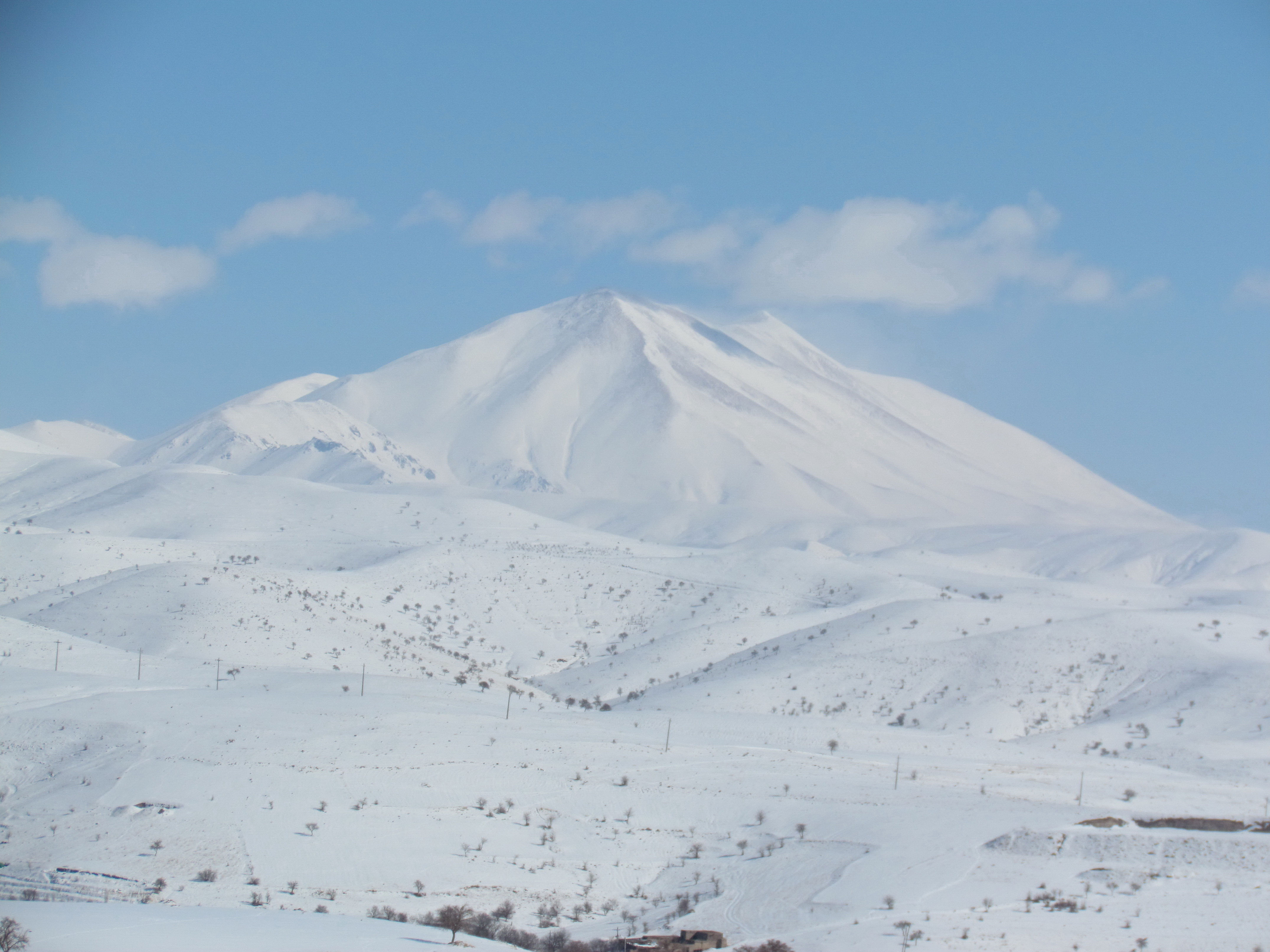
- Mount Sahand in Bonab County

- Location of Bonab County in East Azerbaijan province (bottom left, purple)

- Location of East Azerbaijan province in Iran
- Coordinates: 37°21′N 45°55′E
- Country: Iran
- Province: East Azerbaijan
- Capital: Bonab
- Districts: Central

Population (2016)
  - Total: 134,892
- Time zone: UTC+3:30 (IRST)

Bonab County (Persian: شهرستان بناب) is in East Azerbaijan province, Iran. Its capital is the city of Bonab. The county is located on the east side of Lake Urmia.

== Etymology ==
The name of the county, like most other towns in East Azerbaijan, is of Azeri Turkish origin, means "1000 houses." The meaning "water base" can be considered true because back when the Lake Urmia had yet to lose more than half of its water, digging ground for 5 meters gained access to water in Bonab, but it is not an original meaning.

== History ==
The village of Khusheh Mehr was converted to a city in 2018.

== Demographics ==
=== Language ===
The main language spoken is Azeri.

=== Population ===
At the time of the 2006 National Census, the county's population was 125,209 in 31,921 households. The following census in 2011 counted 129,795 people in 37,353 households. At the time of the 2006 National Census, the county's population was 134,892 in 42,325 households.

=== Administrative divisions ===
Bonab County's population history and administrative structure over three consecutive censuses are shown in the following table.

Bonab County Population
Administrative Divisions	2006	2011	2016
Central District	125,209	129,795	134,892
Benajuy-ye Gharbi RD	25,612	26,062	27,066
Benajuy-ye Sharqi RD	12,179	11,955	10,290
Benajuy-ye Shomali RD	12,086	11,884	12,262
Bonab (city)	75,332	79,894	85,274
Khusheh Mehr (city) (Note: Became a city after the 2016 census)			
Total	125,209	129,795	134,892
RD = Rural District

== Bicycle city of Iran ==
The Great Cycling Conference in 1996 was founded by Mohammad Mirzadoost, head of the Bonab Sports Bureau and former Governor of Bonab. And this conference is held annually with the presence of more than 30,000 bicycle riders in Bonab. In the end, awards will be awarded to the participants by lottery. In the city, there are at least one bike in every building, and most people go to work with their bikes.

== See also ==
Bonab (electoral district)

Media related to Bonab County at Wikimedia Commons
