= Nazarkahrizi Rural District =

Rural district in East Azerbaijan province, Iran

Nazarkahrizi Rural District Persian: دهستان نظركهريزئ
- Rural District
- Location within Iran
- Coordinates: 37°17′N 46°47′E
- Country: Iran
- Province: East Azerbaijan
- County: Hashtrud
- District: Nazarkahrizi
- Established: 1987
- Capital: Nazarkahrizi

Population (2016)
  - Total: 7,076
- Time zone: UTC+3:30 (IRST)

Nazarkahrizi Rural District (Persian: دهستان نظركهريزئ) is in Nazarkahrizi District of Hashtrud County, East Azerbaijan province, Iran. It is administered from the city of Nazarkahrizi.

== Demographics ==
=== Population ===
At the time of the 2006 National Census, the rural district's population was 10,887 in 2,171 households. There were 9,145 inhabitants in 2,274 households at the following census of 2011. The 2016 census measured the population of the rural district as 7,076 in 2,085 households. The most populous of its 79 villages was Sari Qayah, with 500 people.

=== Other villages in the rural district ===
- Alaqayah
- Cherteqlu
- Molla Jiq
- Omran Kandi
