= Nazarkahrizi District =

District in East Azerbaijan province, Iran

Nazarkahrizi District Persian: بخش نظرکهریزی
- District
- Location within Iran
- Coordinates: 37°27′N 46°43′E
- Country: Iran
- Province: East Azerbaijan
- County: Hashtrud
- Capital: Nazarkahrizi

Population (2016)
  - Total: 13,736
- Time zone: UTC+3:30 (IRST)

Nazarkahrizi District (Persian: بخش نظرکهریزی) is in Hashtrud County, East Azerbaijan province, Iran. Its capital is the city of Nazarkahrizi.

== Demographics ==
=== Population ===
At the time of the 2006 National Census, the district's population was 18,629 in 3,569 households. The following census in 2011 counted 16,046 people in 4,058 households. The 2016 census measured the population of the district as 13,736 inhabitants in 4,030 households.

=== Administrative divisions ===
Nazarkahrizi District Population
Administrative Divisions	2006	2011	2016
Almalu RD	6,561	5,635	5,445
Nazarkahrizi RD	10,887	9,145	7,076
Nazarkahrizi (city)	1,181	1,266	1,215
Total	18,629	16,046	13,736
RD = Rural District
