= Hashtrud County =

County in East Azerbaijan province, Iran

Hashtrud County Persian: شهرستان هشترود
- County
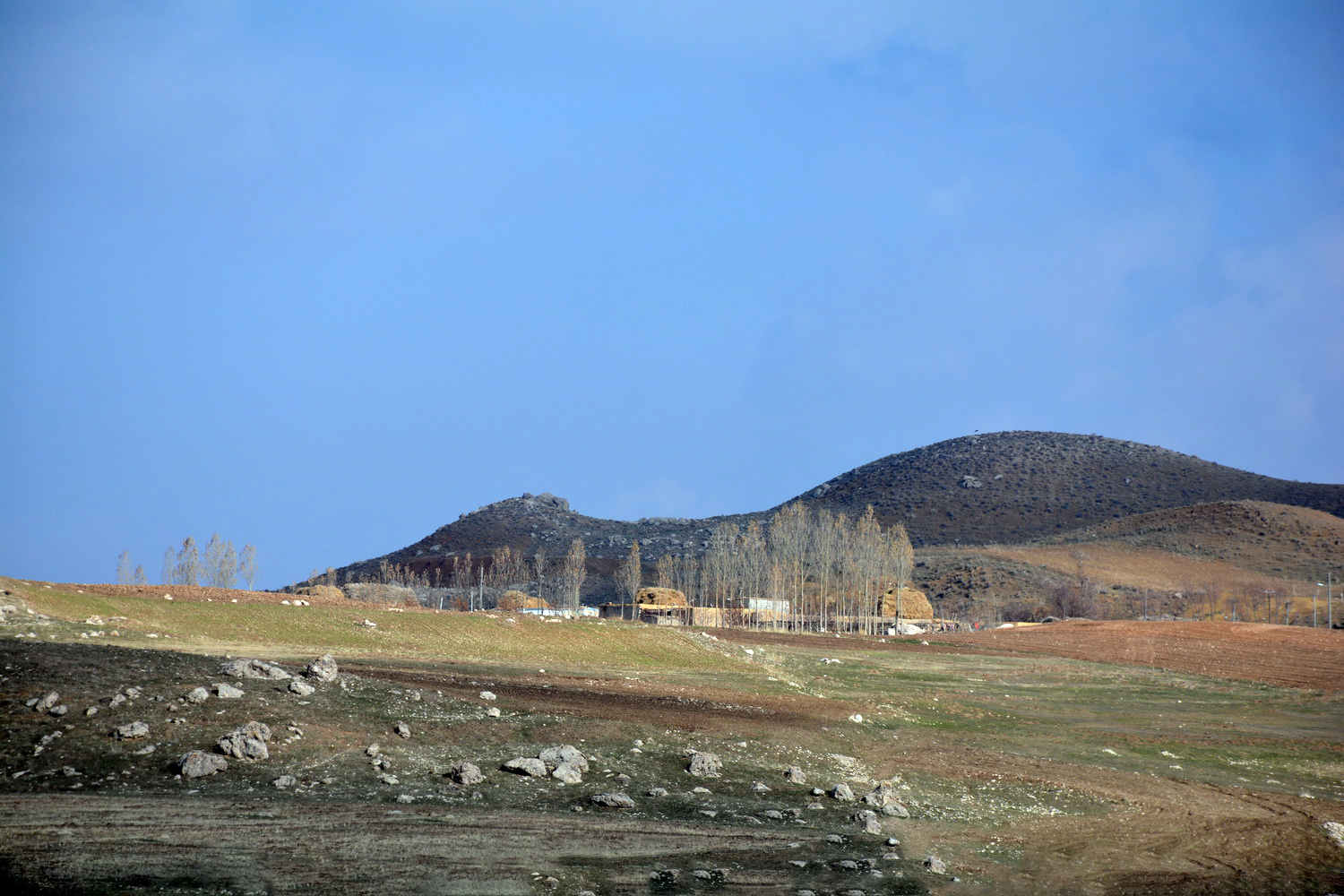
- The village of Agh Bolagh

- Location of Hashtrud County in East Azerbaijan province (bottom center, purple)

- Location of East Azerbaijan province in Iran
- Coordinates: 37°23′N 46°55′E
- Country: Iran
- Province: East Azerbaijan
- Capital: Hashtrud
- Districts: Central, Nazarkahrizi

Population (2016)
  - Total: 57,199
- Time zone: UTC+3:30 (IRST)

Hashtrud County (Persian: شهرستان هشترود) (Note: Also known as Sarāskand) is in East Azerbaijan province, Iran. Its capital is the city of Hashtrud.

== Demographics ==
=== Population ===
At the time of the 2006 National Census, the county's population was 64,611 in 13,997 households. The following census in 2011 counted 60,822 people in 16,245 households. The 2016 census measured the population of the county as 57,199 in 17,173 households.

=== Administrative divisions ===
Hashtrud County's population history and administrative structure over three consecutive censuses are shown in the following table.

Hashtrud County Population
Administrative Divisions	2006	2011	2016
Central District	45,982	44,776	43,463
Aliabad RD	5,595	4,923	4,320
Charuymaq-e Shomalesharqi RD	1,445	1,327	1,141
Kuhsar RD	4,318	3,806	3,559
Qaranqu RD	11,929	10,858	10,263
Soluk RD	4,277	3,959	3,608
Hashtrud (city)	18,418	19,903	20,572
Nazarkahrizi District	18,629	16,046	13,736
Almalu RD	6,561	5,635	5,445
Nazarkahrizi RD	10,887	9,145	7,076
Nazarkahrizi (city)	1,181	1,266	1,215
Total	64,611	60,822	57,199
RD = Rural District

== See also ==
Media related to Hashtrud County at Wikimedia Commons
