= Baghcheh =

Baghcheh (Persian: باغچه) may refer to:

- Baghcheh Jiq, Ardabil
- Baghcheh-ye Jonubi, Bushehr Province
- Baghcheh-ye Shomali, Bushehr Province
- Baghcheh Jiq, East Azerbaijan Province
- Baghcheh Jiq, alternate name of Taghcheh Jiq, East Azerbaijan Province
- Baghcheh Boneh, Gilan Province
- Baghcheh, Hamadan
- Baghcheh, Kabudarahang, Hamadan Province
- Baghcheh-ye Jalil, Kohgiluyeh and Boyer-Ahmad Province
- Baghcheh-ye Maryam, Kurdistan Province
- Baghcheh, Khvaf, Razavi Khorasan Province
- Baghcheh, Mashhad, Razavi Khorasan Province
- Baghcheh, Semnan
- Baghcheh, Behi-e Feyzolah Beygi, Bukan County, West Azerbaijan Province
- Baghcheh, Il Teymur, Bukan County, West Azerbaijan Province
- Baghcheh Juq, West Azerbaijan Province
- Baghcheh, Zanjan
- Baghcheh Ghaz (disambiguation)
