= Seyf ol Din =

Seyf ol Din or Seyf od Din or Seyf ed Din (Persian: سيف الدين) may refer to various places in Iran:

- Seyf ol Din Kuh, East Azerbaijan Province
- Seyf ol Din Rud, East Azerbaijan Province
- Seyf ol Din, Baft, Kerman Province
- Seyf ol Din, Rigan, Kerman Province
- Seyf ol Din-e Olya, West Azerbaijan Province
- Seyf ol Din-e Sofla, West Azerbaijan Province
- Seyf ol Din, Yazd
