= Soluk =

Soluk (Persian: سلوك) may refer to:

- Soluk, East Azerbaijan
- Soluk, West Azerbaijan
- Soluk Rural District, in East Azerbaijan Province
