= Kureh Kani =

Kureh Kani كوره كاني
- Village
- Location within Iran
- Coordinates: 36°18′22″N 45°54′13″E
- Country: Iran
- Province: West Azerbaijan
- County: Bukan
- Bakhsh: Central
- Rural District: Il Gavark

Population (2006)
  - Total: 159
- Time zone: UTC+3:30 (IRST)
  - Summer (DST): UTC+4:30 (IRDT)

Kureh Kani (Persian: كوره كاني, also romanized as Kūreh Kānī) is a village in Il Gavark Rural District in the Central District of Bukan County, West Azerbaijan Province, Iran. At the 2006 census, its population was 159, in 24 families.
