= Kani Tumar =

Kani Tumar كاني طومار
- Village
- Location within Iran
- Coordinates: 36°37′49″N 46°01′58″E
- Country: Iran
- Province: West Azerbaijan
- County: Bukan
- Bakhsh: Central
- Rural District: Akhtachi

Population (2006)
  - Total: 291
- Time zone: UTC+3:30 (IRST)
  - Summer (DST): UTC+4:30 (IRDT)

Kani Tumar (Persian: كاني طومار, also Romanized as Kānī Ţūmār) is a village in Akhtachi Rural District, in the Central District of Bukan County, West Azerbaijan Province, Iran. At the 2006 census, its population was 291, in 56 families.
