= Darvish Ali =

Darvish Ali درويش علي
- Village
- Location within Iran
- Coordinates: 36°26′04″N 46°18′16″E
- Country: Iran
- Province: West Azerbaijan
- County: Bukan
- Bakhsh: Central
- Rural District: Behi-e Feyzolah Beygi

Population (2006)
  - Total: 133
- Time zone: UTC+3:30 (IRST)
  - Summer (DST): UTC+4:30 (IRDT)

Darvish Ali (Persian: درويش علي, also Romanized as Darvīsh ‘Alī) is a village in Behi-e Feyzolah Beygi Rural District, in the Central District of Bukan County, West Azerbaijan Province, Iran. At the 2006 census, its population was 133, in 26 families.
