= Aski Baghdad =

Aski Baghdad اسكي بغداد
- Village
- Location within Iran
- Coordinates: 36°23′48″N 45°57′28″E
- Country: Iran
- Province: West Azerbaijan
- County: Bukan
- Bakhsh: Central
- Rural District: Il Gavark

Population (2006)
  - Total: 325
- Time zone: UTC+3:30 (IRST)

Aski Baghdad (Persian: اسكي بغداد, also Romanized as Askī Baghdād; also known as Askalī Baghdād) is a village in Il Gavark Rural District, in the Central District of Bukan County, West Azerbaijan Province, Iran. At the 2006 census, its population was 325, in 61 families.
