= Quiun Qeshlaqi =

Quiun Qeshlaqi قويون قشلاقي
- Village
- Location within Iran
- Coordinates: 37°23′04″N 46°59′34″E
- Country: Iran
- Province: East Azerbaijan
- County: Hashtrud
- Bakhsh: Central
- Rural District: Qaranqu

Population (2006)
  - Total: 412
- Time zone: UTC+3:30 (IRST)
  - Summer (DST): UTC+4:30 (IRDT)

Quiun Qeshlaqi (Persian: قويون قشلاقي, also Romanized as Qūīūn Qeshlāqī; also known as Qīūn Qeshlāq and Qīun Qeshlāqī) is a village in Qaranqu Rural District, in the Central District of Hashtrud County, East Azerbaijan Province, Iran. At the 2006 census, its population was 412, in 88 families.
