= Tamtoraq =

Tamtoraq طمطراق
- Village
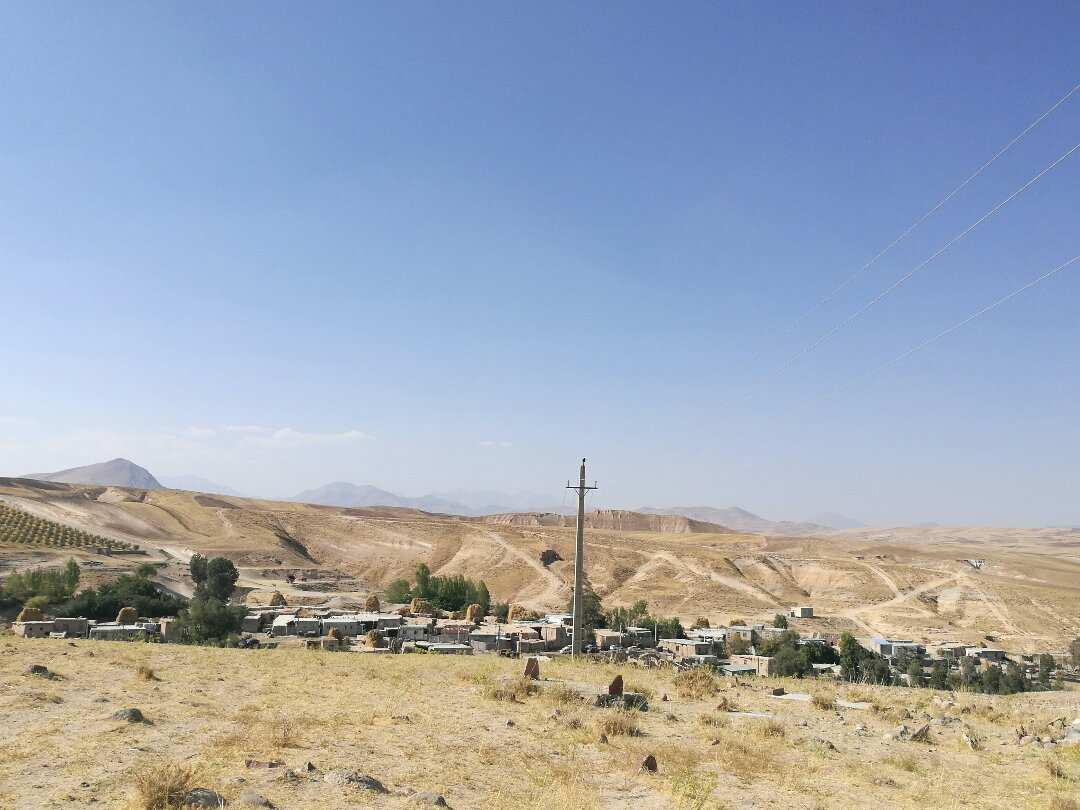

- Location within Iran
- Coordinates: 37°26′44″N 46°44′51″E
- Country: Iran
- Province: East Azerbaijan
- County: Hashtrud
- Bakhsh: Central
- Rural District: Qaranqu

Population (2006)
  - Total: 120
- Time zone: UTC+3:30 (IRST)
  - Summer (DST): UTC+4:30 (IRDT)

Tamtoraq (Persian: طمطراق, also Romanized as Tamţorāq; also known as Tamtorāb-e Qarānqū and Tamţorābī) is a village in Qaranqu Rural District, in the Central District of Hashtrud County, East Azerbaijan Province, Iran. At the 2006 census, its population was 120, in 21 families.
