= Havareh Barzeh =

Havareh Barzeh هواره برزه
- Village
- Location within Iran
- Coordinates: 36°31′52″N 46°19′45″E
- Country: Iran
- Province: West Azerbaijan
- County: Bukan
- Bakhsh: Central
- Rural District: Behi-e Feyzolah Beygi

Population (2006)
  - Total: 126
- Time zone: UTC+3:30 (IRST)
  - Summer (DST): UTC+4:30 (IRDT)

Havareh Barzeh (Persian: هواره برزه, also Romanized as Havāreh Barzeh; also known as Havār Barzeh) is a village in Behi-e Feyzolah Beygi Rural District, in the Central District of Bukan County, West Azerbaijan province, Iran. At the 2006 census, its population was 126, in 20 families.
