= Qatanqor =

Qatanqor قاطانقر
- Village
- Location within Iran
- Coordinates: 36°27′33″N 46°17′03″E
- Country: Iran
- Province: West Azerbaijan
- County: Bukan
- Bakhsh: Central
- Rural District: Behi-e Feyzolah Beygi

Population (2006)
  - Total: 147
- Time zone: UTC+3:30 (IRST)
  - Summer (DST): UTC+4:30 (IRDT)

Qatanqor (Persian: قاطانقر, also Romanized as Qāṭānqor and Qātānqor) is a village located in Behi-e Feyzolah Beygi Rural District, within the Central District of Bukan County, West Azerbaijan Province, Iran. According to the 2006 census, Qatanqor had a population was 147, in 30 families.

== Name ==
According to Vladimir Minorsky, the name "Qatanqur" may be derived from the Mongolian word qatanghir, meaning "slender".
