= Geleh Deh =

Geleh Deh or Gelleh Deh (Persian: گله ده) may refer to:

- Geleh Deh Kuh
- Geleh Deh Rud
