= Lamashan =

Lamashan لامشان
- Village
- Location within Iran
- Coordinates: 37°23′45″N 47°03′09″E
- Country: Iran
- Province: East Azerbaijan
- County: Hashtrud
- Bakhsh: Central
- Rural District: Qaranqu

Population (2006)
  - Total: 515
- Time zone: UTC+3:30 (IRST)
  - Summer (DST): UTC+4:30 (IRDT)

Lamashan (Persian: لامشان, also Romanized as Lamashān) is a village in Qaranqu Rural District, in the Central District of Hashtrud County, East Azerbaijan Province, Iran. At the 2006 census, its population was 515, in 107 families.
