= Yaghian =

Yaghian ياغيان
- Village
- Location within Iran
- Coordinates: 36°15′06″N 45°52′12″E
- Country: Iran
- Province: West Azerbaijan
- County: Bukan
- Bakhsh: Central
- Rural District: Il Gavark

Population (2006)
  - Total: 110
- Time zone: UTC+3:30 (IRST)

Yaghian (Persian: ياغيان, also Romanized as Yāghīān) is a village in Il Gavark Rural District, in the Central District of Bukan County, West Azerbaijan Province, Iran. At the 2006 census, its population was 110, in 18 families.
