= Pir Baha ol Din =

Pir Baha ol Din پيربهاالدين
- Village
- Location within Iran
- Coordinates: 36°16′49″N 45°54′36″E
- Country: Iran
- Province: West Azerbaijan
- County: Bukan
- Bakhsh: Central
- Rural District: Il Gavark

Population (2006)
  - Total: 133
- Time zone: UTC+3:30 (IRST)
  - Summer (DST): UTC+4:30 (IRDT)

Pir Baha ol Din (Persian: پيربهاالدين, also Romanized as Pīr Bahā' ol Dīn and Pīr Bahā' od Dīn) is a village in Il Gavark Rural District, in the Central District of Bukan County, West Azerbaijan Province, Iran. At the 2006 census, its population was 133, in 18 families.
