= Bayqara =

Bayqara (Persian: بايقرا) may refer to:

- Bayqara Kuh
- Bayqara Rud
- Bayqara Mirza I
