= Jan Bolagh =

Jan Bolagh جانبلاغ
- Village
- Location within Iran
- Coordinates: 36°26′39″N 46°27′57″E
- Country: Iran
- Province: West Azerbaijan
- County: Bukan
- Bakhsh: Central
- Rural District: Behi-e Feyzolah Beygi

Population (2006)
  - Total: 174
- Time zone: UTC+3:30 (IRST)
  - Summer (DST): UTC+4:30 (IRDT)

Jan Bolagh (Persian: جانبلاغ, also Romanized as Jān Bolāgh) is a village in Behi-e Feyzolah Beygi Rural District, in the Central District of Bukan County, West Azerbaijan Province, Iran. At the 2006 census, its population was 174, in 37 families.
