= Kalb Ali Kandi =

Kalba'il Kandi كلباایل كندي
- Village
- Location within Iran
- Coordinates: 37°15′58″N 47°11′31″E
- Country: Iran
- Province: East Azerbaijan
- County: Hashtrud
- Bakhsh: Central
- Rural District: Charuymaq-e Shomalesharqi

Population (2006)
  - Total: 31
- Time zone: UTC+3:30 (IRST)
  - Summer (DST): UTC+4:30 (IRDT)

Kalba'il Kandi (Persian: كلباایل كندي, also Romanized as Kalba'il Kandī and Kalba'il Kandī) is a village in Charuymaq-e Shomalesharqi Rural District, in the Central District of Hashtrud County, East Azerbaijan Province, Iran. At the 2006 census, its population was 31, in 7 families.
