= Golulan =

Golulan or Galulan (Persian: گلولان) may refer to:

- Golulan-e Olya
- Golulan-e Sofla
