= Damanab =

Damanab (Persian: دامناب) may refer to:

- Damanab, Ahar
- Damanab, Hashtrud
