= TAPI =

TAPI is a four-letter abbreviation, and may refer to:

- Telephony Application Programming Interface, an API which enables PCs running Microsoft Windows to use telephone services
- Turkmenistan-Afghanistan–Pakistan–India pipeline (Trans-Afghanistan Pipeline), a proposed natural gas pipeline
- Teva Active Pharmaceutical Ingredients, a stand-alone business unit of Teva Pharmaceutical Industries limited
- TAPI-1, inhibitor used in biochemistry

Tapi may refer to:

== Business ==
- Tapi Carpets, a British carpet retailer

== People ==
- Tapi Dharma Rao, Indian writer
- Tapi Chanakya, Indian film director
- Dragan Malesevic Tapi (Dragan Malešević Tapi), Serbian hyper realist painter

== Geography ==
- Tapi, Iran
- Tapi district, Gujarat, India
- Tapi River (disambiguation)
  - Tapti River (often spelled Tapi), in the state of Madhya Pradesh, Maharashtra and Gujarat in India
  - Tapi River, Thailand (Thai: ตาปี, sometimes spelled Tapee), in the Surat Thani Province, Southern Thailand
