= Darah Gerdaleh =

Darah Gerdaleh داره گردله
- Village
- Location within Iran
- Coordinates: 36°33′39″N 45°58′55″E
- Country: Iran
- Province: West Azerbaijan
- County: Bukan
- Bakhsh: Central
- Rural District: Il Teymur

Population (2006)
  - Total: 140
- Time zone: UTC+3:30 (IRST)
  - Summer (DST): UTC+4:30 (IRDT)

Darah Gerdaleh (Persian: داره گردله, also romanized as Dārah Gardaleh; also known as Dār Gerdaleh and Dār Gerdāleh) is a village in Il Teymur Rural District, in the Central District of Bukan County, West Azerbaijan Province, Iran. At the 2006 census, its population was 140, comprising 26 families.
