= Ashi Golan =

Ashi Golan اشي گلان
- Village
- Location within Iran
- Coordinates: 36°35′56″N 45°58′29″E
- Country: Iran
- Province: West Azerbaijan
- County: Bukan
- Bakhsh: Central
- Rural District: Akhtachi

Population (2006)
  - Total: 135
- Time zone: UTC+3:30 (IRST)
  - Summer (DST): UTC+4:30 (IRDT)

Ashi Golan (Persian: اشي گلان, also Romanized as Āshī Golān; also known as Ash Golān and Āsh Golān) is a village in Akhtachi Rural District, in the Central District of Bukan County, West Azerbaijan Province, Iran. At the 2006 census, its population was 135, in 19 families.
