= Bughda Daghi =

Bughda Daghi بوغداداغي
- Village
- Location within Iran
- Coordinates: 36°30′38″N 46°02′19″E
- Country: Iran
- Province: West Azerbaijan
- County: Bukan
- Bakhsh: Central
- Rural District: Il Teymur

Population (2006)
  - Total: 106
- Time zone: UTC+3:30 (IRST)
  - Summer (DST): UTC+4:30 (IRDT)

Bughda Daghi (Persian: بوغداداغي, also Romanized as Būghdā Dāghī; also known as Boghdeh Dāghī) is a village in Il Teymur Rural District, in the Central District of Bukan County, West Azerbaijan Province, Iran. At the 2006 census, its population was 106, in 20 families.
