= Sombeh =

Sombeh ثمبه
- Village
- Location within Iran
- Coordinates: 36°24′24″N 45°56′09″E
- Country: Iran
- Province: West Azerbaijan
- County: Bukan
- Bakhsh: Central
- Rural District: Il Gavark

Population (2006)
  - Total: 82
- Time zone: UTC+3:30 (IRST)

Sombeh (Persian: ثمبه, also Romanized as S̄ombeh) is a village in Il Gavark Rural District, in the Central District of Bukan County, West Azerbaijan Province, Iran. At the 2006 census, its population was 82, in 23 families.
