= Zavehkuh =

Zavehkuh زاوه كوه
- Village
- Location within Iran
- Coordinates: 36°15′37″N 45°47′18″E
- Country: Iran
- Province: West Azerbaijan
- County: Bukan
- Bakhsh: Central
- Rural District: Il Gavark

Population (2006)
  - Total: 371
- Time zone: UTC+3:30 (IRST)

Zavehkuh (Persian: زاوه كوه, also Romanized as Zāvehkūh) is a village in Il Gavark Rural District, in the Central District of Bukan County, West Azerbaijan Province, Iran. At the 2006 census, its population was 371, in 57 families.
