= Qarah Baraz =

Qora Baraz قوره براز
- Village
- Location within Iran
- Coordinates: 36°27′15″N 46°21′34″E
- Country: Iran
- Province: West Azerbaijan
- County: Bukan
- Bakhsh: Central
- Rural District: Behi-e Feyzolah Beygi

Population (2006)
  - Total: 213
- Time zone: UTC+3:30 (IRST)
  - Summer (DST): UTC+4:30 (IRDT)

Qora Baraz (Persian: قره براز, also Romanized as Qora Barāz; also known as Qoreh Barāz) is a village in Behi-e Feyzolah Beygi Rural District, in the Central District of Bukan County, West Azerbaijan Province, Iran. At the 2006 census, its population was 213, in 45 families.
