= Qelij =

Qelij قليج
- Village
- Location within Iran
- Coordinates: 36°25′18″N 46°14′29″E
- Country: Iran
- Province: West Azerbaijan
- County: Bukan
- Bakhsh: Central
- Rural District: Behi-e Feyzolah Beygi

Population (2006)
  - Total: 57
- Time zone: UTC+3:30 (IRST)
  - Summer (DST): UTC+4:30 (IRDT)

Qelij (Persian: قليج, also Romanized as Qelīj; also known as Qelīch) is a village in Behi-e Feyzolah Beygi Rural District, in the Central District of Bukan County, West Azerbaijan Province, Iran. At the 2006 census, its population was 57, in 9 families.
