= Bezni =

Bezni (Persian: بزني) may refer to:

- Bezni Bodaq
- Bezni-ye Cheragh Mardan
