= Takan Tappeh =

Takan Tappeh Persian: تكان‌تپه
- Village
- Location within Iran
- Coordinates: 36°27′34″N 46°26′31″E
- Country: Iran
- Province: West Azerbaijan
- County: Bukan
- Bakhsh: Central
- Rural District: Behi-e Feyzolah Beygi

Population (2006)
  - Total: 537
- Time zone: UTC+3:30 (IRST)
  - Summer (DST): UTC+4:30 (IRDT)

Takan Tappeh (Persian: تكان‌تپه, Sorani Kurdish: تیکانتەپە, also Romanized as Takān Tappeh) is a village in Behi-e Feyzolah Beygi Rural District, in the Central District of Bukan County, West Azerbaijan Province, Iran. At the 2006 census, its population was 537, in 116 families.
