= Sharafkand =

Sharafkand شرفكند
- Village
- Location within Iran
- Coordinates: 36°36′41″N 45°58′53″E
- Country: Iran
- Province: West Azerbaijan
- County: Bukan
- Bakhsh: Central
- Rural District: Akhtachi

Population (2006)
  - Total: 145
- Time zone: UTC+3:30 (IRST)
  - Summer (DST): UTC+4:30 (IRDT)

Sharafkand (Persian: شرفكند) is a village in Akhtachi Rural District, in the Central District of Bukan County, West Azerbaijan Province, Iran. At the 2006 census, its population was 145, in 22 families.
