= Qarajah Qayah-ye Panahi =

Qarajah Qayah-ye Panahi قرجه قيه پناهي
- Village
- Location within Iran
- Coordinates: 37°36′03″N 47°00′16″E
- Country: Iran
- Province: East Azerbaijan
- County: Hashtrud
- Bakhsh: Central
- Rural District: Kuhsar

Population (2006)
  - Total: 196
- Time zone: UTC+3:30 (IRST)
  - Summer (DST): UTC+4:30 (IRDT)

Qarajah Qayah-ye Panahi (Persian: قرجه قيه پناهي, also Romanized as Qarājah Qayah-ye Panāhī; also known as Qarajah Qayah) is a village in Kuhsar Rural District, in the Central District of Hashtrud County, East Azerbaijan Province, Iran. At the 2006 census, its population was 196, in 46 families.
