= Sar Baghcheh =

Sar Baghcheh سرباغچه
- Village
- Location within Iran
- Coordinates: 36°32′41″N 45°56′20″E
- Country: Iran
- Province: West Azerbaijan
- County: Bukan
- Bakhsh: Central
- Rural District: Il Teymur

Population (2006)
  - Total: 52
- Time zone: UTC+3:30 (IRST)
  - Summer (DST): UTC+4:30 (IRDT)

Sar Baghcheh (Persian: سرباغچه, also Romanized as Sar Bāghcheh) is a village in Il Teymur Rural District, in the Central District of Bukan County, West Azerbaijan Province, Iran. At the 2006 census, its population was 52, in 10 families.
