= Danguz-e Olya =

Danguz-e Olya دنگوزعليا
- Village
- Location within Iran
- Coordinates: 36°36′25″N 46°07′14″E
- Country: Iran
- Province: West Azerbaijan
- County: Bukan
- Bakhsh: Central
- Rural District: Akhtachi

Population (2006)
  - Total: 136
- Time zone: UTC+3:30 (IRST)
  - Summer (DST): UTC+4:30 (IRDT)

Danguz-e Olya (Persian: دنگوزعليا, also Romanized as Dangūz-e 'Olyā; also known as Vangūz-e 'Olyā) is a village in Akhtachi Rural District, in the Central District of Bukan County, West Azerbaijan province, Iran. At the 2006 census, its population was 136, in 24 families.
