= Baba Kandi =

Baba Kandi باباكندي
- Village
- Location within Iran
- Coordinates: 37°33′19″N 47°04′15″E
- Country: Iran
- Province: East Azerbaijan
- County: Hashtrud
- Bakhsh: Central
- Rural District: Kuhsar

Population (2006)
  - Total: 196
- Time zone: UTC+3:30 (IRST)
  - Summer (DST): UTC+4:30 (IRDT)

Baba Kandi (Persian: باباكندي, also Romanized as Bābā Kandī; also known as Bābā Kandī Kūh) is a village in Kuhsar Rural District, in the Central District of Hashtrud County, East Azerbaijan Province, Iran. At the 2006 census, its population was 196, in 38 families.
