= Goli Bolagh-e Gonbadlu =

Goli Bolagh-e Gonbadlu گلي بلاغ گنبدلو
- Village
- Location within Iran
- Coordinates: 37°23′59″N 46°57′15″E
- Country: Iran
- Province: East Azerbaijan
- County: Hashtrud
- Bakhsh: Central
- Rural District: Qaranqu

Population (2006)
  - Total: 43
- Time zone: UTC+3:30 (IRST)
  - Summer (DST): UTC+4:30 (IRDT)

Goli Bolagh-e Gonbadlu (Persian: گلي بلاغ گنبدلو, also Romanized as Golī Bolāgh-e Gonbadlū; also known as Golī Bolāghī) is a village in Qaranqu Rural District, in the Central District of Hashtrud County, East Azerbaijan Province, Iran. At the 2006 census, its population was 43, in 12 families.
