= Cheraghchi =

Cheraghchi چراغچي
- Village
- Location within Iran
- Coordinates: 37°34′38″N 46°50′10″E
- Country: Iran
- Province: East Azerbaijan
- County: Hashtrud
- Bakhsh: Central
- Rural District: Soluk

Population (2006)
  - Total: 421
- Time zone: UTC+3:30 (IRST)
  - Summer (DST): UTC+4:30 (IRDT)

Cheraghchi (Persian: چراغچي, also Romanized as Cherāghchī) is a village in Soluk Rural District, in the Central District of Hashtrud County, East Azerbaijan Province, Iran. At the 2006 census, its population was 421, in 72 families.
