= Nisakabad, Bukan =

Nisakabad نيسك اباد
- Village
- Location within Iran
- Coordinates: 36°37′45″N 45°58′02″E
- Country: Iran
- Province: West Azerbaijan
- County: Bukan
- Bakhsh: Central
- Rural District: Akhtachi

Population (2006)
  - Total: 71
- Time zone: UTC+3:30 (IRST)
  - Summer (DST): UTC+4:30 (IRDT)

Nisakabad (Persian: نيسك اباد, also Romanized as Nīsakābād; also known as Nasīkābād) is a village in Akhtachi Rural District, in the Central District of Bukan County, West Azerbaijan Province, Iran. At the 2006 census, its population was 71, in 14 families.
