= Yasavol =

Yasavol or Yasavel (Persian: يساول) may refer to:

- Yasavol, Charuymaq, East Azerbaijan Province
- Yasavel, Hashtrud, East Azerbaijan Province
- Yasavol, Markazi
- Yasavol, Zanjan
