= Ebrahim Khesar =

Ebrahim Khesar ابراهيم خسار
- Village
- Location within Iran
- Coordinates: 36°16′11″N 45°44′45″E
- Country: Iran
- Province: West Azerbaijan
- County: Bukan
- Bakhsh: Central
- Rural District: Il Gavark

Population (2006)
  - Total: 198
- Time zone: UTC+3:30 (IRST)
  - Summer (DST): UTC+4:30 (IRDT)

Ebrahim Khesar (Persian: ابراهيم خسار, also Romanized as Ebrāhīm Khesār; also known as Ebrāhīm Ḩeşār and Ibrāhīm Hisār) is a village in Il Gavark Rural District, in the Central District of Bukan County, West Azerbaijan Province, Iran. At the 2006 census, its population was 198, in 31 families.
