= Talesh Kandi =

Talesh Kandi طالش كندي
- Village
- Location within Iran
- Coordinates: 37°13′37″N 47°13′49″E
- Country: Iran
- Province: East Azerbaijan
- County: Hashtrud
- Bakhsh: Central
- Rural District: Charuymaq-e Shomalesharqi

Population (2006)
  - Total: 87
- Time zone: UTC+3:30 (IRST)
  - Summer (DST): UTC+4:30 (IRDT)

Talesh Kandi (Persian: طالش كندي, also Romanized as Ţālesh Kandī) is a village in Charuymaq-e Shomalesharqi Rural District, in the Central District of Hashtrud County, East Azerbaijan province, Iran. At the 2006 census, its population was 87, in 24 families.
