= Kani Pankeh Qajer =

Kani Pankeh Qajer Persian: کانی پانکه قاجر
- Village
- Location within Iran
- Coordinates: 36°29′48″N 46°04′57″E
- Country: Iran
- Province: West Azerbaijan
- County: Bukan
- Bakhsh: Central
- Rural District: Il Teymur

Population (2006)
  - Total: 66
- Time zone: UTC+3:30 (IRST)
  - Summer (DST): UTC+4:30 (IRDT)

Kani Pankeh Qajer (Persian: کانی پانکه قاجر, also Romanized as Kānī Pānkeh Qājer; also known as Kāni Panka, Kānī Pānkeh, Kānī Pankeh-ye Tājer, and Kānī Ponkeh Tājer) is a village in Il Teymur Rural District, in the Central District of Bukan County, West Azerbaijan Province, Iran. At the 2006 census, its population was 66, in 12 families.
