= Charlu =

Charlu or Cherlu (Persian: چرلو) may refer to:

- Charlu, Hashtrud
- Cherlu, Sarab
