= Zir Andul =

Zir Andul زيراندول
- Village
- Location within Iran
- Coordinates: 36°17′28″N 45°49′48″E
- Country: Iran
- Province: West Azerbaijan
- County: Bukan
- Bakhsh: Central
- Rural District: Il Gavark

Population (2006)
  - Total: 227
- Time zone: UTC+3:30 (IRST)

Zir Andul (Persian: زيراندول, also Romanized as Zīr Andūl and Zīrāndūl) is a village in Il Gavark Rural District, in the Central District of Bukan County, West Azerbaijan Province, Iran. At the 2006 census, its population was 227, in 33 families.
