= Chibni =

Chibni چيبني
- Village
- Location within Iran
- Coordinates: 37°23′00″N 47°03′44″E
- Country: Iran
- Province: East Azerbaijan
- County: Hashtrud
- Bakhsh: Central
- Rural District: Qaranqu

Population (2006)
  - Total: 113
- Time zone: UTC+3:30 (IRST)
  - Summer (DST): UTC+4:30 (IRDT)

Chibni (Persian: چيبني, also Romanized as Chībnī; also known as Chalik and Chapīnī) is a village in Qaranqu Rural District, in the Central District of Hashtrud County, East Azerbaijan Province, Iran. At the 2006 census, its population was 113, in 29 families.
