= Qarvchah =

Qarvchah (Persian: قروچاه), also rendered as Qarvchay, may refer to:

- Qarvchah-e Olya
- Qarvchah-e Sofla
