= Laseh Golan =

Laseh Golan لاسه گلان
- Village
- Location within Iran
- Coordinates: 36°27′11″N 45°54′09″E
- Country: Iran
- Province: West Azerbaijan
- County: Bukan
- Bakhsh: Central
- Rural District: Il Teymur

Population (2006)
  - Total: 115
- Time zone: UTC+3:30 (IRST)
  - Summer (DST): UTC+4:30 (IRDT)

Laseh Golan (Persian: لاسه گلان, also Romanized as Lāseh Golān) is a village in Il Teymur Rural District, in the Central District of Bukan County, West Azerbaijan Province, Iran. At the 2006 census, its population was 115, in 16 families.
