= Yasi Kand =

Yasi Kand یاسی‌کند
- village
- Location within Iran
- Coordinates: 36°30′33″N 46°19′18″E
- Country: Iran
- Province: West Azerbaijan
- County: Bukan
- Bakhsh: Central
- Rural District: Behi-e Feyzolah Beygi

Population (2006)
  - Total: 149
- Time zone: UTC+3:30 (IRST)
  - Summer (DST): UTC+4:30 (IRDT)

Yasi Kand (Persian: یاسی‌کند, also Romanized as Yāsī Kand; also known as Yāsī Kandī) is a village in Behi-e Feyzolah Beygi Rural District, in the Central District of Bukan County, West Azerbaijan Province, Iran. At the 2006 census, its population was 149, in 27 families.
