= Pash Bolagh =

Pash Bolagh پاش بلاغ
- Village
- Location within Iran
- Coordinates: 36°29′33″N 46°00′07″E
- Country: Iran
- Province: West Azerbaijan
- County: Bukan
- Bakhsh: Central
- Rural District: Il Teymur

Population (2006)
  - Total: 239
- Time zone: UTC+3:30 (IRST)
  - Summer (DST): UTC+4:30 (IRDT)

Pash Bolagh (Persian: پاش بلاغ, also Romanized as Pāsh Bolāgh; also known as Pāzh Bolāgh) is a village in Il Teymur Rural District, in the Central District of Bukan County, West Azerbaijan Province, Iran. At the 2006 census, its population was 239, in 42 families.
