= Qaluy =

Qaluy (Persian: قالوي), also rendered as Qalu, may refer to:

- Qaluy Rasul Aqa
- Qaluy Sheykhan
