= Bezujiq =

Bezujiq بزوجيق
- Village
- Location within Iran
- Coordinates: 37°26′34″N 46°47′00″E
- Country: Iran
- Province: East Azerbaijan
- County: Hashtrud
- Bakhsh: Central
- Rural District: Qaranqu

Population (2006)
  - Total: 215
- Time zone: UTC+3:30 (IRST)
  - Summer (DST): UTC+4:30 (IRDT)

Bezujiq (Persian: بزوجيق, also Romanized as Bezūjīq; also known as Bezūjeq) is a village in Qaranqu Rural District, in the Central District of Hashtrud County, East Azerbaijan Province, Iran. At the 2006 census, its population was 215, in 39 families.
