= Owshendel =

Village in East Azerbaijan province, Iran

Owshendel Persian: اوشندل
- Village
- Location within Iran
- Coordinates: 37°33′07″N 47°05′35″E
- Country: Iran
- Province: East Azerbaijan
- County: Hashtrud
- District: Central
- Rural District: Kuhsar

Population (2016)
  - Total: 853
- Time zone: UTC+3:30 (IRST)

Owshendel (Persian: اوشندل) (Note: Also known as Uchdal and Ūshendel) is a village in, and the capital of, Kuhsar Rural District in the Central District of Hashtrud County, East Azerbaijan province, Iran.

== Demographics ==
=== Population ===
At the time of the 2006 National Census, the village's population was 891 in 199 households. The following census in 2011 counted 897 people in 255 households. The 2016 census measured the population of the village as 853 people in 262 households. It was the most populous village in its rural district.
