= Agh Bolagh, Hashtrud =

Village in East Azerbaijan province, Iran

Agh Bolagh Persian: اغ بلاغ
- Village
- Location within Iran
- Coordinates: 37°33′58″N 47°08′59″E
- Country: Iran
- Province: East Azerbaijan
- County: Hashtrud
- District: Central
- Rural District: Kuhsar

Population (2016)
  - Total: 299
- Time zone: UTC+3:30 (IRST)

Agh Bolagh (Persian: اغ بلاغ) (Note: Also romanized as Āgh Bolāgh; also known as Āq Bolāgh and Āqbolāgh) is a village in Kuhsar Rural District of the Central District in Hashtrud County, East Azerbaijan province, Iran.

== Demographics ==
=== Population ===
At the time of the 2006 National Census, the village's population was 435 in 95 households. The following census in 2011 counted 362 people in 88 households. The 2016 census measured the population of the village as 299 people in 89 households.
