= Tapi, Iran =

Tapi تپي
- Village
- Location within Iran
- Coordinates: 36°29′03″N 46°02′36″E
- Country: Iran
- Province: West Azerbaijan
- County: Bukan
- Bakhsh: Central
- Rural District: Il Teymur

Population (2006)
  - Total: 150
- Time zone: UTC+3:30 (IRST)
  - Summer (DST): UTC+4:30 (IRDT)

Tapi (Persian: تپي, also Romanized as Tapī) is a village in Il Teymur Rural District, in the Central District of Bukan County, West Azerbaijan Province, Iran. At the 2006 census, its population was 150, in 23 families.
