= Seyf ol Din-e Olya =

Seyf ol Din-e Olya سيفالدين عليا
- Village
- Location within Iran
- Coordinates: 36°34′20″N 46°02′46″E
- Country: Iran
- Province: West Azerbaijan
- County: Bukan
- Bakhsh: Central
- Rural District: Akhtachi

Population (2006)
  - Total: 170
- Time zone: UTC+3:30 (IRST)
  - Summer (DST): UTC+4:30 (IRDT)

Seyf ol Din-e Olya (Persian: سيفالدين عليا, also Romanized as Seyf ol Dīn-e ‘Olyā and Seyf od Dīn-e ‘Olyā) is a village in Akhtachi Rural District, in the Central District of Bukan County, West Azerbaijan Province, Iran. At the 2006 census, its population was 170, in 25 families.
