= Charuymaq =

Charuymaq (Persian: چاراویماق) may refer to:

- Charuymaq County
- Charuymaq-e Jonubegharbi Rural District
- Charuymaq-e Jonubesharqi Rural District
- Charuymaq-e Markazi Rural District
- Charuymaq-e Sharqi Rural District
- Charuymaq-e Shomalesharqi Rural District
