= Amu Dizaj =

Village in East Azerbaijan province, Iran

Amu Dizaj Persian: عموديزج
- Village
- Location within Iran
- Coordinates: 37°36′41″N 47°05′10″E
- Country: Iran
- Province: East Azerbaijan
- County: Hashtrud
- District: Central
- Rural District: Kuhsar

Population (2016)
  - Total: 311
- Time zone: UTC+3:30 (IRST)

Amu Dizaj (Persian: عموديزج) (Note: Also romanized as ‘Amū Dīzaj; also known as ‘Amū Dozjī, ‘Amūd Zajī, and Amzahni) is a village in Kuhsar Rural District of the Central District in Hashtrud County, East Azerbaijan province, Iran.

== Demographics ==
=== Population ===
At the time of the 2006 National Census, the village's population was 378 in 72 households. The following census in 2011 counted 339 people in 90 households. The 2016 census measured the population of the village as 311 people in 100 households.
