= Nowbar =

Village in West Azerbaijan province, Iran

Nowbar Persian: نوبار
- Village
- Location within Iran
- Coordinates: 36°32′07″N 46°00′47″E
- Country: Iran
- Province: West Azerbaijan
- County: Bukan
- District: Central
- Rural District: Il Teymur

Population (2016)
  - Total: 359
- Time zone: UTC+3:30 (IRST)

Nowbar (Persian: نوبار) (Note: Also romanized as Nowbār) is a village in, and the capital of, Il Teymur Rural District in the Central District of Bukan County, West Azerbaijan province, Iran.

== Demographics ==
=== Population ===
At the time of the 2006 National Census, the village's population was 433 in 79 households. The following census in 2011 counted 415 people in 81 households. The 2016 census measured the population of the village as 359 people in 111 households.
