= Zu ol Bin =

Village in East Azerbaijan province, Iran

Zu ol Bin Persian: ذوالبين
- Village
- Location within Iran
- Coordinates: 37°28′42″N 46°52′49″E
- Country: Iran
- Province: East Azerbaijan
- County: Hashtrud
- District: Central
- Rural District: Qaranqu

Population (2016)
  - Total: 1,309
- Time zone: UTC+3:30 (IRST)

Zu ol Bin (Persian: ذوالبين) (Note: Also romanized as Z̄ū ol Bīn; also known as Dowlbeyn, Zolbeyn, and Zūlbīn) is a village in, and the capital of, Qaranqu Rural District in the Central District of Hashtrud County, East Azerbaijan province, Iran.

== Demographics ==
=== Population ===
At the time of the 2006 National Census, the village's population was 1,099 in 241 households. The following census in 2011 counted 1,175 people in 323 households. The 2016 census measured the population of the village as 1,309 people in 416 households. It was the most populous village in its rural district.
