= Dizaj-e Reza Qoli Beyg =

Village in East Azerbaijan province, Iran

Dizaj-e Reza Qoli Beyg Persian: ديزج رضاقلي بيگ
- Village
- Location within Iran
- Coordinates: 37°31′19″N 47°12′08″E
- Country: Iran
- Province: East Azerbaijan
- County: Hashtrud
- District: Central
- Rural District: Kuhsar

Population (2016)
  - Total: 702
- Time zone: UTC+3:30 (IRST)

Dizaj-e Reza Qoli Beyg (Persian: ديزج رضاقلي بيگ) (Note: Also romanized as Dīzaj-e Rez̤ā Qolī Beyg; also known as ‘Alī Qolī Beyg (علي قلي بيگ), Dīzaj, and Dīzaj-e ‘Alīqolī Beyg) is a village in Kuhsar Rural District of the Central District in Hashtrud County, East Azerbaijan province, Iran.

== Demographics ==
=== Population ===
At the time of the 2006 National Census, the village's population was 875 in 212 households. The following census in 2011 counted 711 people in 224 households. The 2016 census measured the population of the village as 702 people in 242 households.
