= Kahriz-e Sardar =

Village in West Azerbaijan province, Iran

Kahriz-e Sardar Persian: كهريزسردار
- Village
- Location within Iran
- Coordinates: 36°27′31″N 46°12′46″E
- Country: Iran
- Province: West Azerbaijan
- County: Bukan
- District: Central
- Rural District: Behi-ye Feyzolah Beygi

Population (2016)
  - Total: 847
- Time zone: UTC+3:30 (IRST)

Kahriz-e Sardar (Persian: كهريزسردار) (Note: Also romanized as Kahrīz-e Sardār) is a village in Behi-ye Feyzolah Beygi Rural District of the Central District in Bukan County, West Azerbaijan province, Iran.

== Demographics ==
=== Population ===
At the time of the 2006 National Census, the village's population was 327 in 64 households. The following census in 2011 counted 447 people in 107 households. The 2016 census measured the population of the village as 847 people in 234 households.
