= Gol-e Behi =

Village in West Azerbaijan province, Iran

Gol-e Behi Persian: گل بهي
- Village
- Location within Iran
- Coordinates: 36°32′02″N 46°15′50″E
- Country: Iran
- Province: West Azerbaijan
- County: Bukan
- District: Central
- Rural District: Behi-ye Feyzolah Beygi

Population (2016)
  - Total: 1,336
- Time zone: UTC+3:30 (IRST)

Gol-e Behi (Persian: گل بهي) (Note: Also romanized as Gol-e Behī; also known as Gol) is a village in Behi-ye Feyzolah Beygi Rural District of the Central District in Bukan County, West Azerbaijan province, Iran.

== Demographics ==
=== Population ===
At the time of the 2006 National Census, the village's population was 255 in 48 households. The following census in 2011 counted 379 people in 100 households. The 2016 census measured the population of the village as 1,336 people in 376 households.
