= Sheykhlar, West Azerbaijan =

Village in West Azerbaijan province, Iran

Sheykhlar Persian: شيخ لر
- Village
- Location within Iran
- Coordinates: 36°32′46″N 46°09′09″E
- Country: Iran
- Province: West Azerbaijan
- County: Bukan
- District: Central
- Rural District: Akhtachi

Population (2016)
  - Total: 731
- Time zone: UTC+3:30 (IRST)

Sheykhlar (Persian: شيخ لر) is a village in Akhtachi Rural District of the Central District in Bukan County, West Azerbaijan province, Iran.

== Demographics ==
=== Population ===
At the time of the 2006 National Census, the village's population was 367 in 63 households. The following census in 2011 counted 474 people in 113 households. The 2016 census measured the population of the village as 731 people in 214 households.
