= Sardarabad, West Azerbaijan =

Village in West Azerbaijan province, Iran

Sardarabad Persian: سرداراباد
- Village
- Location within Iran
- Coordinates: 36°35′24″N 45°56′31″E
- Country: Iran
- Province: West Azerbaijan
- County: Bukan
- District: Central
- Rural District: Il Teymur

Population (2016)
  - Total: 324
- Time zone: UTC+3:30 (IRST)

Sardarabad (Persian: سرداراباد) (Note: Also romanized as Sardārābād) is a village in Il Teymur Rural District of the Central District in Bukan County, West Azerbaijan province, Iran.

== Demographics ==
=== Population ===
At the time of the 2006 National Census, the village's population was 372 in 66 households. The following census in 2011 counted 353 people in 70 households. The 2016 census measured the population of the village as 324 people in 99 households.
