= Seyd Beyg =

Village in East Azerbaijan province, Iran

Seyd Beyg Persian: صیدبیگ
- Village
- Location within Iran
- Coordinates: 37°36′40″N 46°48′33″E
- Country: Iran
- Province: East Azerbaijan
- County: Hashtrud
- District: Central
- Rural District: Soluk

Population (2016)
  - Total: 546
- Time zone: UTC+3:30 (IRST)

Seyd Beyg (Persian: صیدبیگ) (Note: Also romanized as Şeyd Beyg; also known as Seyyedī Beyg) is a village in Soluk Rural District of the Central District in Hashtrud County, East Azerbaijan province, Iran.

== Demographics ==
=== Population ===
At the time of the 2006 National Census, the village's population was 643 in 134 households. The following census in 2011 counted 627 people in 152 households. The 2016 census measured the population of the village as 546 people in 131 households. It was the most populous village in its rural district.
