= Golulan-e Olya =

Golulan-e Olya گلولان عليا
- Village
- Location within Iran
- Coordinates: 36°16′13″N 45°53′51″E
- Country: Iran
- Province: West Azerbaijan
- County: Bukan
- Bakhsh: Central
- Rural District: Il Gavark

Population (2006)
  - Total: 204
- Time zone: UTC+3:30 (IRST)
  - Summer (DST): UTC+4:30 (IRDT)

Golulan-e Olya (Persian: گلولان عليا, also Romanized as Golūlān-e ‘Olyā) is a village in Il Gavark Rural District, in the Central District of Bukan County, West Azerbaijan Province, Iran. At the 2006 census, its population was 204, in 30 families.
