= Bayqara Kuh =

Bayqara Kuh بايقراكوه
- Village
- Location within Iran
- Coordinates: 37°31′07″N 46°41′41″E
- Country: Iran
- Province: East Azerbaijan
- County: Hashtrud
- Bakhsh: Central
- Rural District: Qaranqu

Population (2006)
  - Total: 177
- Time zone: UTC+3:30 (IRST)
  - Summer (DST): UTC+4:30 (IRDT)

Bayqara Kuh (Persian: بايقراكوه; Azerbaijani: Dağ Bayqara or داغ بایقارا; also Romanized as Bāyqarā’ Kūh; also known as Bai Qara, Bāyqarā’, and Bay Qareh) is a village in Qaranqu Rural District, in the Central District of Hashtrud County, East Azerbaijan Province, Iran. At the 2006 census, its population was 177, in 40 families.
