= Nasirabad-e Sofla =

Village in East Azerbaijan province, Iran

Nasirabad-e Sofla Persian: نصيراباد سفلي
- Village
- Location within Iran
- Coordinates: 37°16′20″N 47°13′54″E
- Country: Iran
- Province: East Azerbaijan
- County: Hashtrud
- District: Central
- Rural District: Charuymaq-e Shomalesharqi

Population (2016)
  - Total: 542
- Time zone: UTC+3:30 (IRST)

Nasirabad-e Sofla (Persian: نصيرابادسفلي) (Note: Also romanized as Naşīrābād-e Soflá) is a village in, and the capital of, Charuymaq-e Shomalesharqi Rural District in the Central District of Hashtrud County, East Azerbaijan province, Iran.

== Demographics ==
=== Population ===
At the time of the 2006 National Census, the village's population was 730 in 154 households. The following census in 2011 counted 702 people in 193 households. The 2016 census measured the population of the village as 542 people in 195 households. It was the most populous village in its rural district.
