= Makatu =

Village in East Azerbaijan province, Iran

Makatu Persian: مكتو
- Village
- Location within Iran
- Coordinates: 37°19′05″N 47°08′03″E
- Country: Iran
- Province: East Azerbaijan
- County: Hashtrud
- District: Central
- Rural District: Charuymaq-e Shomalesharqi

Population (2016)
  - Total: 114
- Time zone: UTC+3:30 (IRST)

Makatu (Persian: مكتو) (Note: Also romanized as Makatū) is a village in Charuymaq-e Shomalesharqi Rural District of the Central District in Hashtrud County, East Azerbaijan province, Iran.

== Demographics ==
=== Population ===
At the time of the 2006 National Census, the village's population was 168 in 41 households. The following census in 2011 counted 171 people in 51 households. The 2016 census measured the population of the village as 114 people in 35 households.

== Etymology ==
According to Vladimir Minorsky, the name "Makatu" is derived from the Mongolian word meketü, meaning "sly".
