= Qazlian =

Village in West Azerbaijan province, Iran

Qazlian Persian: قازليان
- Village
- Location within Iran
- Coordinates: 36°28′14″N 46°09′32″E
- Country: Iran
- Province: West Azerbaijan
- County: Bukan
- District: Central
- Rural District: Akhtachi

Population (2016)
  - Total: 418
- Time zone: UTC+3:30 (IRST)

Qazlian (Persian: قازليان) (Note: Also romanized as Qāzlīān; also known as Kasaliah, Qāzelyāh, and Qāzilyān) is a village in Akhtachi Rural District of the Central District in Bukan County, West Azerbaijan province, Iran.

== Demographics ==
=== Population ===
At the time of the 2006 National Census, the village's population was 439 in 70 households. The following census in 2011 counted 429 people in 121 households. The 2016 census measured the population of the village as 418 people in 128 households.
