= Bardeh Zard =

Village in West Azerbaijan province, Iran

Bardeh Zard Persian: برده زرد
- Village
- Location within Iran
- Coordinates: 36°24′29″N 46°20′19″E
- Country: Iran
- Province: West Azerbaijan
- County: Bukan
- District: Central
- Rural District: Behi-ye Feyzolah Beygi

Population (2016)
  - Total: 779
- Time zone: UTC+3:30 (IRST)

Bardeh Zard (Persian: برده زرد) is a village in Behi-ye Feyzolah Beygi Rural District of the Central District in Bukan County, West Azerbaijan province, Iran.

== Demographics ==
=== Population ===
At the time of the 2006 National Census, the village's population was 984 in 202 households. The following census in 2011 counted 977 people in 222 households. The 2016 census measured the population of the village as 779 people in 211 households.
