= Bezni-ye Cheragh Mardan =

Bezni-ye Cheragh Mardan بزني چراغ مردان
- Village
- Location within Iran
- Coordinates: 37°20′26″N 47°16′16″E
- Country: Iran
- Province: East Azerbaijan
- County: Hashtrud
- Bakhsh: Central
- Rural District: Charuymaq-e Shomalesharqi

Population (2006)
  - Total: 33
- Time zone: UTC+3:30 (IRST)
  - Summer (DST): UTC+4:30 (IRDT)

Bezni-ye Cheragh Mardan (Persian: بزني چراغ مردان, also Romanized as Beznī-ye Cherāgh Mardān; also known as Beznī-ye Laţīf) is a village in Charuymaq-e Shomalesharqi Rural District, in the Central District of Hashtrud County, East Azerbaijan Province, Iran. At the 2006 census, its population was 33, in 5 families.
