= Okuz Gonbadi =

Village in East Azerbaijan province, Iran

Okuz Gonbadi Persian: اكوزگنبدي
- Village
- Location within Iran
- Coordinates: 37°34′43″N 47°04′27″E
- Country: Iran
- Province: East Azerbaijan
- County: Hashtrud
- District: Central
- Rural District: Kuhsar

Population (2016)
  - Total: 435
- Time zone: UTC+3:30 (IRST)

Okuz Gonbadi (Persian: اكوزگنبدي) (Note: Also romanized as Okūz Gonbadī; also known as Akiz Gonbadi (اکيزگنبدي) and Āgūz Gonbadī) is a village in Kuhsar Rural District of the Central District in Hashtrud County, East Azerbaijan province, Iran.

== Demographics ==
=== Population ===
At the time of the 2006 National Census, the village's population was 459 in 99 households. The following census in 2011 counted 472 people in 128 households. The 2016 census measured the population of the village as 435 people in 125 households.
