= Yekshaveh =

Village in West Azerbaijan province, Iran

Yekshaveh Persian: يكشوه
- Village
- Location within Iran
- Coordinates: 36°29′26″N 46°19′47″E
- Country: Iran
- Province: West Azerbaijan
- County: Bukan
- District: Central
- Rural District: Behi-ye Feyzolah Beygi

Population (2016)
  - Total: 596
- Time zone: UTC+3:30 (IRST)

Yekshaveh (Persian: يكشوه) (Note: Also known as Yek Shabā) is a village in, and the capital of, Behi-ye Feyzolah Beygi Rural District in the Central District of Bukan County, West Azerbaijan province, Iran.

== Demographics ==
=== Population ===
At the time of the 2006 National Census, the village's population was 546 in 107 households. The following census in 2011 counted 601 people in 156 households. The 2016 census measured the population of the village as 596 people in 181 households.
