= Kuseh, Bukan =

Village in West Azerbaijan province, Iran

Kuseh Persian: كوسه
- Village
- Location within Iran
- Coordinates: 36°30′01″N 46°11′14″E
- Country: Iran
- Province: West Azerbaijan
- County: Bukan
- District: Central
- Rural District: Akhtachi

Population (2016)
  - Total: 1,081
- Time zone: UTC+3:30 (IRST)

Kuseh (Persian: كوسه) (Note: Also romanized as Kūseh) is a village in Akhtachi Rural District of the Central District in Bukan County, West Azerbaijan province, Iran.

== Demographics ==
=== Population ===
At the time of the 2006 National Census, the village's population was 662 in 123 households. The following census in 2011 counted 875 people in 246 households. The 2016 census measured the population of the village as 1,081 people in 320 households.
