= Geleh Deh Kuh =

Geleh Deh Kuh گله ده كوه
- Village
- Location within Iran
- Coordinates: 37°34′44″N 47°01′54″E
- Country: Iran
- Province: East Azerbaijan
- County: Hashtrud
- Bakhsh: Central
- Rural District: Kuhsar

Population (2006)
  - Total: 94
- Time zone: UTC+3:30 (IRST)
  - Summer (DST): UTC+4:30 (IRDT)

Geleh Deh Kuh (Persian: گله ده كوه, also Romanized as Geleh Deh Kūh; also known as Geleh Deh) is a village in Kuhsar Rural District, in the Central District of Hashtrud County, East Azerbaijan Province, Iran. At the 2006 census, its population was 94, in 16 families.
