= Qarvchah-e Olya =

Qarvchah-e Olya قروچاه عليا
- Village
- Location within Iran
- Coordinates: 36°20′28″N 45°54′17″E
- Country: Iran
- Province: West Azerbaijan
- County: Bukan
- Bakhsh: Central
- Rural District: Il Gavark

Population (2006)
  - Total: 133
- Time zone: UTC+3:30 (IRST)

Qarvchah-e Olya (Persian: قروچاه عليا, also Romanized as Qarvchāh-e ‘Olyā; also known as Qarvchāy-e ‘Olyā) is a village in Il Gavark Rural District, in the Central District of Bukan County, West Azerbaijan Province, Iran. At the 2006 census, its population was 133, in 22 families.
