= Beyk Kandi =

Village in East Azerbaijan province, Iran

Beyk Kandi Persian: بيك كندي
- Village
- Location within Iran
- Coordinates: 37°32′48″N 46°55′18″E
- Country: Iran
- Province: East Azerbaijan
- County: Hashtrud
- District: Central
- Rural District: Qaranqu

Population (2016)
  - Total: 508
- Time zone: UTC+3:30 (IRST)

Beyk Kandi (Persian: بيك كندي) (Note: Also romanized as Beyk Kandī; also known as Beyg Kandī and Beyg Kandī Rūd) is a village in Qaranqu Rural District of the Central District in Hashtrud County, East Azerbaijan province, Iran.

== Demographics ==
=== Population ===
At the time of the 2006 National Census, the village's population was 593 in 133 households. The following census in 2011 counted 534 people in 165 households. The 2016 census measured the population of the village as 508 people in 160 households.
