= Qarvchah-e Sofla =

Qarvchah-e Sofla قروچاه سفلي
- Village
- Location within Iran
- Coordinates: 36°20′13″N 45°57′33″E
- Country: Iran
- Province: West Azerbaijan
- County: Bukan
- Bakhsh: Central
- Rural District: Il Gavark

Population (2006)
  - Total: 320
- Time zone: UTC+3:30 (IRST)
  - Summer (DST): UTC+4:30 (IRDT)

Qarvchah-e Sofla (Persian: قروچاه سفلي, also Romanized as Qarvchāh-e Soflá) is a village in Il Gavark Rural District, in the Central District of Bukan County, West Azerbaijan Province, Iran. At the 2006 census, its population was 320, in 55 families.
