= Salamat, West Azerbaijan =

Village in West Azerbaijan province, Iran

Salamat Persian: سلامت
- Village
- Location within Iran
- Coordinates: 36°16′51″N 45°52′18″E
- Country: Iran
- Province: West Azerbaijan
- County: Bukan
- District: Central
- Rural District: Il Gavark

Population (2016)
  - Total: 401
- Time zone: UTC+3:30 (IRST)

Salamat (Persian: سلامت) (Note: Also romanized as Salāmat) is a village in Il Gavark Rural District of the Central District in Bukan County, West Azerbaijan province, Iran.

== Demographics ==
=== Population ===
At the time of the 2006 National Census, the village's population was 439 in 61 households. The following census in 2011 counted 405 people in 68 households. The 2016 census measured the population of the village as 401 people in 105 households.
