= Arqaneh =

Village in East Azerbaijan province, Iran

Arqaneh Persian: ارقنه
- Village
- Location within Iran
- Coordinates: 37°34′18″N 46°56′26″E
- Country: Iran
- Province: East Azerbaijan
- County: Hashtrud
- District: Central
- Rural District: Soluk

Population (2016)
  - Total: 422
- Time zone: UTC+3:30 (IRST)

Arqaneh (Persian: ارقنه) is a village in Soluk Rural District of the Central District in Hashtrud County, East Azerbaijan province, Iran.

== Demographics ==
=== Population ===
At the time of the 2006 National Census, the village's population was 432 in 95 households. The following census in 2011 counted 420 people in 115 households. The 2016 census measured the population of the village as 422 people in 127 households.
