= Kahrizeh-ye Mahmud Aqa =

Village in West Azerbaijan province, Iran

Kahrizeh-ye Mahmud Aqa Persian: كهريزه محمود اقا
- Village
- Location within Iran
- Coordinates: 36°31′47″N 46°10′20″E
- Country: Iran
- Province: West Azerbaijan
- County: Bukan
- District: Central
- Rural District: Akhtachi

Population (2016)
  - Total: 4,058
- Time zone: UTC+3:30 (IRST)

Kahrizeh-ye Mahmud Aqa (Persian: كهريزه محموداقا) (Note: Also romanized as Kahrīzeh-ye Maḩmūd Āqā; also known as Kahrīzeh-ye Maḩmūdābād) is a village in Akhtachi Rural District of the Central District in Bukan County, West Azerbaijan province, Iran.

== Demographics ==
=== Population ===
At the time of the 2006 National Census, the village's population was 1,187 in 247 households. The following census in 2011 counted 2,955 people in 778 households. The 2016 census measured the population of the village as 4,058 people in 1,144 households. It was the most populous village in its rural district.
