= Vazifeh Khvoran =

Village in East Azerbaijan province, Iran

Vazifeh Khvoran Persian: وظيفه خوران
- Village
- Location within Iran
- Coordinates: 37°32′18″N 46°59′09″E
- Country: Iran
- Province: East Azerbaijan
- County: Hashtrud
- District: Central
- Rural District: Qaranqu

Population (2016)
  - Total: 714
- Time zone: UTC+3:30 (IRST)

Vazifeh Khvoran (Persian: وظيفه خوران) (Note: Also romanized as Vaz̧īfeh Khowrān and Vaz̧īfeh Khvorān; also known as Vazīfeh Khorān) is a village in Qaranqu Rural District of the Central District in Hashtrud County, East Azerbaijan province, Iran.

== Demographics ==
=== Population ===
At the time of the 2006 National Census, the village's population was 654 in 153 households. The following census in 2011 counted 734 people in 197 households. The 2016 census measured the population of the village as 714 people in 202 households.
