= Jambugheh =

Village in West Azerbaijan province, Iran

Jambugheh Persian: جمبوغه
- Village
- Location within Iran
- Coordinates: 36°28′48″N 46°07′08″E
- Country: Iran
- Province: West Azerbaijan
- County: Bukan
- District: Central
- Rural District: Akhtachi

Population (2016)
  - Total: 390
- Time zone: UTC+3:30 (IRST)

Jambugheh (Persian: جمبوغه) (Note: Also romanized as Jambūgheh; also known as Jambū‘eh) is a village in Akhtachi Rural District of the Central District in Bukan County, West Azerbaijan province, Iran.

== Demographics ==
=== Population ===
At the time of the 2006 National Census, the village's population was 514 in 71 households. The following census in 2011 counted 486 people in 93 households. The 2016 census measured the population of the village as 390 people in 123 households.
