= Sard Kuhestan =

Village in West Azerbaijan province, Iran

Sard Kuhestan Persian: سردكوهستان
- Village
- Location within Iran
- Coordinates: 36°14′40″N 45°49′06″E
- Country: Iran
- Province: West Azerbaijan
- County: Bukan
- District: Central
- Rural District: Il Gavark

Population (2016)
  - Total: 394
- Time zone: UTC+3:30 (IRST)

Sard Kuhestan (Persian: سردكوهستان) (Note: Also romanized as Sard Kūhestān) is a village in Il Gavark Rural District of the Central District in Bukan County, West Azerbaijan province, Iran.

== Demographics ==
=== Population ===
At the time of the 2006 National Census, the village's population was 491 in 74 households. The following census in 2011 counted 466 people in 104 households. The 2016 census measured the population of the village as 394 people in 107 households.
