= Baghcheh Ghaz =

Baghcheh Ghaz (Persian: باغچه غاز) may refer to:

- Baghcheh Ghaz, Hamadan
- Baghcheh Ghaz, Markazi
