= Qaluy Sheykhan =

Qaluy Sheykhan قالوي شيخان
- Village
- Location within Iran
- Coordinates: 36°24′30″N 45°53′19″E
- Country: Iran
- Province: West Azerbaijan
- County: Bukan
- Bakhsh: Central
- Rural District: Il Gavark

Population (2006)
  - Total: 128
- Time zone: UTC+3:30 (IRST)
  - Summer (DST): UTC+4:30 (IRDT)

Qaluy Sheykhan (Persian: قالوي شيخان, also Romanized as Qālūy Sheykhān; also known as Qālū Sheykhān) is a village in Il Gavark Rural District, in the Central District of Bukan County, West Azerbaijan Province, Iran. At the 2006 census, its population was 128, in 26 families.
