= Khvorjestan =

Village in East Azerbaijan province, Iran

Khvorjestan Persian: خورجستان
- Village
- Location within Iran
- Coordinates: 37°29′27″N 47°02′04″E
- Country: Iran
- Province: East Azerbaijan
- County: Hashtrud
- District: Central
- Rural District: Qaranqu

Population (2016)
  - Total: 1,051
- Time zone: UTC+3:30 (IRST)

Khvorjestan (Persian: خورجستان) (Note: Also romanized as Khvorjestān) is a village in Qaranqu Rural District of the Central District in Hashtrud County, East Azerbaijan province, Iran.

== Demographics ==
=== Population ===
At the time of the 2006 National Census, the village's population was 1,022 in 244 households. The following census in 2011 counted 1,117 people in 332 households. The 2016 census measured the population of the village as 1,051 people in 328 households.
