= Nasirabad-e Olya =

Village in East Azerbaijan province, Iran

Nasirabad-e Olya Persian: نصيراباد عليا
- Village
- Location within Iran
- Coordinates: 37°16′29″N 47°13′36″E
- Country: Iran
- Province: East Azerbaijan
- County: Hashtrud
- District: Central
- Rural District: Charuymaq-e Shomalesharqi

Population (2016)
  - Total: 111
- Time zone: UTC+3:30 (IRST)

Nasirabad-e Olya (Persian: نصيرابادعليا) (Note: Also romanized as Naşīrābād-e ‘Olyā; also known as Naşrābād) is a village in Charuymaq-e Shomalesharqi Rural District of the Central District in Hashtrud County, East Azerbaijan province, Iran.

== Demographics ==
=== Population ===
At the time of the 2006 National Census, the village's population was 184 in 30 households. The following census in 2011 counted 147 people in 45 households. The 2016 census measured the population of the village as 111 people in 49 households.
