= Hesar, Bukan =

Village in West Azerbaijan province, Iran

Hesar Persian: حصار
- Village
- Location within Iran
- Coordinates: 36°28′31″N 46°11′11″E
- Country: Iran
- Province: West Azerbaijan
- County: Bukan
- District: Central
- Rural District: Behi-ye Feyzolah Beygi

Population (2016)
  - Total: 843
- Time zone: UTC+3:30 (IRST)

Hesar (Persian: حصار) (Note: Also romanized as Ḩeşār) is a village in Behi-ye Feyzolah Beygi Rural District of the Central District in Bukan County, West Azerbaijan province, Iran.

== Demographics ==
=== Population ===
At the time of the 2006 National Census, the village's population was 476 in 86 households. The following census in 2011 counted 570 people in 164 households. The 2016 census measured the population of the village as 843 people in 245 households.
