= Shahrikand =

Village in West Azerbaijan province, Iran

Shahrikand Persian: شهري كند
- Village
- Location within Iran
- Coordinates: 36°26′34″N 46°03′33″E
- Country: Iran
- Province: West Azerbaijan
- County: Bukan
- District: Central
- Rural District: Il Teymur

Population (2016)
  - Total: 705
- Time zone: UTC+3:30 (IRST)

Shahrikand (Persian: شهري كند) (Note: Also romanized as Shahrī Kand and Shahrīkand) is a village in Il Teymur Rural District of the Central District in Bukan County, West Azerbaijan province, Iran.

== Demographics ==
=== Population ===
At the time of the 2006 National Census, the village's population was 694 in 117 households. The following census in 2011 counted 747 people in 165 households. The 2016 census measured the population of the village as 705 people in 211 households. It was the most populous village in its rural district.
