= Aghutman =

Village in West Azerbaijan province, Iran

Aghutman Persian: اغوتمان
- Village
- Location within Iran
- Coordinates: 36°20′22″N 45°50′28″E
- Country: Iran
- Province: West Azerbaijan
- County: Bukan
- District: Central
- Rural District: Il Gavark

Population (2016)
  - Total: 336
- Time zone: UTC+3:30 (IRST)

Aghutman (Persian: اغوتمان) (Note: Also romanized as Āghūtmān) is a village in Il Gavark Rural District of the Central District in Bukan County, West Azerbaijan province, Iran.

== Demographics ==
=== Population ===
At the time of the 2006 National Census, the village's population was 432 in 63 households. The following census in 2011 counted 389 people in 97 households. The 2016 census measured the population of the village as 336 people in 88 households.
