= Kani Rash, Bukan =

Village in West Azerbaijan province, Iran

Kani Rash Persian: كاني رش
- Village
- Location within Iran
- Coordinates: 36°34′11″N 45°54′36″E
- Country: Iran
- Province: West Azerbaijan
- County: Bukan
- District: Central
- Rural District: Il Teymur

Population (2016)
  - Total: 438
- Time zone: UTC+3:30 (IRST)

Kani Rash (Persian: كاني رش) (Note: Also romanized as Kānī Rash) is a village in Il Teymur Rural District of the Central District in Bukan County, West Azerbaijan province, Iran.

== Demographics ==
=== Population ===
At the time of the 2006 National Census, the village's population was 488 in 70 households. The following census in 2011 counted 429 people in 95 households. The 2016 census measured the population of the village as 438 people in 152 households.
