= Seyf ol Din Kuh =

Seyf ol Din Kuh سيفالدين كوه
- Village
- Location within Iran
- Coordinates: 37°37′11″N 46°59′01″E
- Country: Iran
- Province: East Azerbaijan
- County: Hashtrud
- Bakhsh: Central
- Rural District: Kuhsar

Population (2006)
  - Total: 21
- Time zone: UTC+3:30 (IRST)
  - Summer (DST): UTC+4:30 (IRDT)

Seyf ol Din Kuh (Persian: سيفالدين كوه, also Romanized as Seyf ol Dīn Kūh, Seyf ed Dīn Kūh and Seyf od Dīn Kūh) is a village in Kuhsar Rural District, in the Central District of Hashtrud County, East Azerbaijan Province, Iran. At the 2006 census, its population was 21, in 5 families.
