= Charlu, Hashtrud =

Charlu چرلو
- Village
- Location within Iran
- Coordinates: 37°32′47″N 46°57′35″E
- Country: Iran
- Province: East Azerbaijan
- County: Hashtrud
- Bakhsh: Central
- Rural District: Soluk

Population (2006)
  - Total: 191
- Time zone: UTC+3:30 (IRST)
  - Summer (DST): UTC+4:30 (IRDT)

Charlu (Persian: چرلو, also Romanized as Charlū) is a village in Soluk Rural District, in the Central District of Hashtrud County, East Azerbaijan Province, Iran. At the 2006 census, its population was 191, in 40 families.
