= Qareh Kand, West Azerbaijan =

Village in West Azerbaijan province, Iran

Qareh Kand Persian: قره كند
- Village
- Location within Iran
- Coordinates: 36°34′33″N 46°04′42″E
- Country: Iran
- Province: West Azerbaijan
- County: Bukan
- District: Central
- Rural District: Akhtachi

Population (2016)
  - Total: 422
- Time zone: UTC+3:30 (IRST)

Qareh Kand (Persian: قره كند) (Note: Also known as Qarā Kand) is a village in, and the capital of, Akhtachi Rural District in the Central District of Bukan County, West Azerbaijan province, Iran.

== Demographics ==
=== Population ===
At the time of the 2006 National Census, the village's population was 327 in 54 households. The following census in 2011 counted 460 people in 94 households. The 2016 census measured the population of the village as 422 people in 96 households.
