= Qajer =

Village in West Azerbaijan province, Iran

Qajer Persian: قاجر
- Village
- Location within Iran
- Coordinates: 36°27′43″N 46°04′07″E
- Country: Iran
- Province: West Azerbaijan
- County: Bukan
- District: Central
- Rural District: Il Teymur

Population (2016)
  - Total: 401
- Time zone: UTC+3:30 (IRST)

Qajer (Persian: قاجر) (Note: Also romanized as Qājer) is a village in Il Teymur Rural District of the Central District in Bukan County, West Azerbaijan province, Iran.

== Demographics ==
=== Population ===
At the time of the 2006 National Census, the village's population was 417 in 65 households. The following census in 2011 counted 408 people in 83 households. The 2016 census measured the population of the village as 401 people in 128 households.
