= Bezni Bodaq =

Bezni Bodaq بزني بداق
- Village
- Location within Iran
- Coordinates: 37°19′02″N 47°17′15″E
- Country: Iran
- Province: East Azerbaijan
- County: Hashtrud
- Bakhsh: Central
- Rural District: Charuymaq-e Shomalesharqi

Population (1)
  - Total: 10
- Time zone: UTC+3:30 (IRST)
  - Summer (DST): UTC+4:30 (IRDT)

Bezni Bodaq (Persian: بزني بداق, also Romanized as Beznī Bodāq; also known as Beznī Bodāgh and Beznī Būdāgh) is a village in Charuymaq-e Shomalesharqi Rural District, in the Central District of Hashtrud County, East Azerbaijan Province, Iran. At the 2006 census, its population was 10, in 4 families.
