= Tabut =

Tabut may refer to:

- Tabut, an alternative transliteration of Tabbat, Bukan, a village in Iran
- Tabut, another name for Tabuik, a festival in West Sumatra
- Tabut, the name given in the Quran for The Ark of the Covenant

== See also ==
- Tabot, a replica of the Arks of the Covenant in Ethiopia
