= Seyf ol Din Rud =

Seyf ol Din Rud سيف الدين رود
- Village
- Location within Iran
- Coordinates: 37°24′51″N 46°58′49″E
- Country: Iran
- Province: East Azerbaijan
- County: Hashtrud
- Bakhsh: Central
- Rural District: Qaranqu

Population (2006)
  - Total: 117
- Time zone: UTC+3:30 (IRST)
  - Summer (DST): UTC+4:30 (IRDT)

Seyf ol Din Rud (Persian: سيف الدين رود, also Romanized as Seyf ol Dīn Rūd, Seyf ed Dīn Rūd, and Seyf od Dīn Rūd) is a village in Qaranqu Rural District, in the Central District of Hashtrud County, East Azerbaijan Province, Iran. At the 2006 census, its population was 117, in 23 families.
