= Saadatlu =

Village in East Azerbaijan province, Iran

Saadatlu Persian: سعادتلو
- Village
- Location within Iran
- Coordinates: 37°28′28″N 46°48′31″E
- Country: Iran
- Province: East Azerbaijan
- County: Hashtrud
- District: Central
- Rural District: Qaranqu

Population (2016)
  - Total: 807
- Time zone: UTC+3:30 (IRST)

Saadatlu (Persian: سعادتلو) (Note: Also romanized as Sa‘ādatlū) is a village in Qaranqu Rural District of the Central District in Hashtrud County, East Azerbaijan province, Iran.

== Demographics ==
=== Population ===
At the time of the 2006 National Census, the village's population was 648 in 120 households. The following census in 2011 counted 672 people in 211 households. The 2016 census measured the population of the village as 807 people in 256 households.
