= Seyf ol Din-e Sofla =

Seyf ol Din-e Sofla سيفالدين سفلي
- Village
- Location within Iran
- Coordinates: 36°34′37″N 46°04′22″E
- Country: Iran
- Province: West Azerbaijan
- County: Bukan
- Bakhsh: Central
- Rural District: Akhtachi

Population (2006)
  - Total: 143
- Time zone: UTC+3:30 (IRST)
  - Summer (DST): UTC+4:30 (IRDT)

Seyf ol Din-e Sofla (Persian: سيفالدين سفلي, also Romanized as Seyf ol Dīn-e Soflá and Seyf od Dīn-e Soflá; also known as Seyf od Dīn) is a village in Akhtachi Rural District, in the Central District of Bukan County, West Azerbaijan Province, Iran. At the 2006 census, its population was 143, in 26 families.
