= Baba Kandi Rud =

Village in East Azerbaijan province, Iran

Baba Kandi Rud Persian: باباكندي رود
- Village
- Location within Iran
- Coordinates: 37°29′16″N 46°52′44″E
- Country: Iran
- Province: East Azerbaijan
- County: Hashtrud
- District: Central
- Rural District: Qaranqu

Population (2016)
  - Total: 496
- Time zone: UTC+3:30 (IRST)

Baba Kandi Rud (Persian: باباكندي رود) (Note: Also romanized as Bābā Kandī Rūd; also known as Bābā Kandī) is a village in Qaranqu Rural District of the Central District in Hashtrud County, East Azerbaijan province, Iran.

== Demographics ==
=== Population ===
At the time of the 2006 National Census, the village's population was 646 in 149 households. The following census in 2011 counted 532 people in 145 households. The 2016 census measured the population of the village as 496 people in 158 households.
