= Beyg Bolaghi =

Beyg Bolaghi (Persian: بيگ بلاغي) may refer to:

- Beyg Bolaghi, Hashtrud
- Beyg Bolaghi, Meyaneh
