= Soluk, East Azerbaijan =

Village in East Azerbaijan province, Iran

Soluk Persian: سلوك
- Village
- Location within Iran
- Coordinates: 37°32′57″N 46°50′36″E
- Country: Iran
- Province: East Azerbaijan
- County: Hashtrud
- District: Central
- Rural District: Soluk

Population (2016)
  - Total: 464
- Time zone: UTC+3:30 (IRST)

Soluk (Persian: سلوك) (Note: Also romanized as Solūk) is a village in, and the capital of, Soluk Rural District in the Central District of Hashtrud County, East Azerbaijan province, Iran.

== Demographics ==
=== Population ===
At the time of the 2006 National Census, the village's population was 630 in 143 households. The following census in 2011 counted 516 people in 148 households. The 2016 census measured the population of the village as 464 people in 158 households.
