= Geleh Deh Rud =

Village in East Azerbaijan province, Iran

Geleh Deh Rud Persian: گله ده رود
- Village
- Location within Iran
- Coordinates: 37°31′56″N 46°51′23″E
- Country: Iran
- Province: East Azerbaijan
- County: Hashtrud
- District: Central
- Rural District: Soluk

Population (2016)
  - Total: 446
- Time zone: UTC+3:30 (IRST)

Geleh Deh Rud (Persian: گله ده رود) (Note: Also romanized as Geleh Deh Rūd; also known as Geleh Deh and Gelleh Deh) is a village in Soluk Rural District of the Central District in Hashtrud County, East Azerbaijan province, Iran.

== Demographics ==
=== Population ===
At the time of the 2006 National Census, the village's population was 538 in 113 households. The following census in 2011 counted 493 people in 139 households. The 2016 census measured the population of the village as 446 people in 149 households.
