= Damanab, Hashtrud =

Village in East Azerbaijan province, Iran

Damanab Persian: دامناب
- Village
- Location within Iran
- Coordinates: 37°29′37″N 46°59′55″E
- Country: Iran
- Province: East Azerbaijan
- County: Hashtrud
- District: Central
- Rural District: Qaranqu

Population (2016)
  - Total: 940
- Time zone: UTC+3:30 (IRST)

Damanab (Persian: دامناب) (Note: Also romanized as Dāmanāb and Demnāb; also known as Dāmaneh Āb and Dāmaneh-ye Āb) is a village in Qaranqu Rural District of the Central District in Hashtrud County, East Azerbaijan province, Iran.

== Demographics ==
=== Population ===
At the time of the 2006 National Census, the village's population was 1,054 in 223 households. The following census in 2011 counted 961 people in 260 households. The 2016 census measured the population of the village as 940 people in 283 households.
