= Tabbat, Bukan =

Village in West Azerbaijan province, Iran

Tabbat Persian: تبت
- Village
- Location within Iran
- Coordinates: 36°26′55″N 46°14′03″E
- Country: Iran
- Province: West Azerbaijan
- County: Bukan
- District: Central
- Rural District: Behi-ye Feyzolah Beygi

Population (2016)
  - Total: 533
- Time zone: UTC+3:30 (IRST)

Tabbat (Persian: تبت) (Note: Also known as Tabūt) is a village in Behi-ye Feyzolah Beygi Rural District of the Central District in Bukan County, West Azerbaijan province, Iran.

== Demographics ==
=== Population ===
At the time of the 2006 National Census, the village's population was 416 in 88 households. The following census in 2011 counted 535 people in 158 households. The 2016 census measured the population of the village as 533 people in 162 households.
