= Hashtrud =

City in East Azerbaijan province, Iran

Hashtrud Persian: هشترود
- City
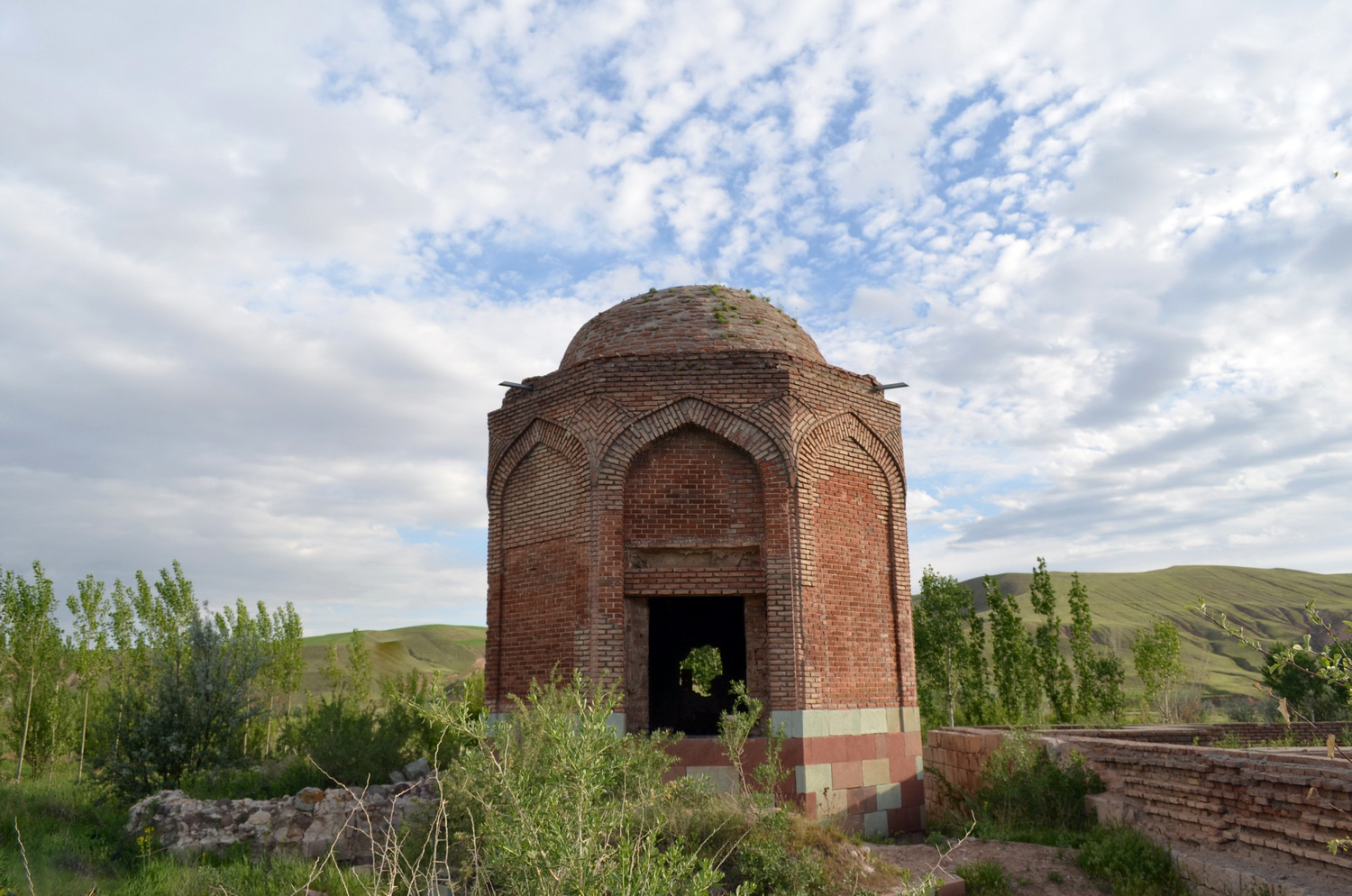
- Bayazid Bastami Tomb

- Location within Iran
- Coordinates: 37°28′33″N 47°02′59″E
- Country: Iran
- Province: East Azerbaijan
- County: Hashtrud
- District: Central

Population (2016)
  - Total: 20,572
- Time zone: UTC+3:30 (IRST)

Hashtrud (Persian: هشترود) (Note: Also romanized as Hashtrūd; also known as Āz̄arān, Sar Eskand, Sar Eskand Khān, Sar Eskandar, and Sarāskand; Azerbaijani: سرسکند) is a city in the Central District of Hashtrud County, East Azerbaijan province, Iran, serving as capital of both the county and the district.

== History ==
Hashtrud is home to Zahhak Castle, named after Zahhak in ancient Persian mythology. The castle was inhabited by various Persian dynasties until the Timurid era.

== Geography ==
Hashtrud is 140 km from Tabriz, the capital of the province. The city is bordered by the Sahand mountains toward the west of the city, and is surrounded by several rivers, such as the Qaranquchay and Uzan Rivers.

== Demographics ==
=== Population ===
Before the 1979 Islamic Revolution, a census report recalls that Hashtrud was home to roughly 10 Jewish families. At the time of the 2006 National Census, the city's population was 18,418 in 4,493 households. The following census in 2011 counted 19,903 people in 5,376 households. The 2016 census measured the population of the city as 20,572 people in 6,056 households.

== See also ==
Media related to Hashtrud at Wikimedia Commons
