= Baghcheh, Il Teymur =

Village in West Azerbaijan province, Iran

Baghcheh Persian: باغچه
- Village
- Location within Iran
- Coordinates: 36°31′25″N 45°54′43″E
- Country: Iran
- Province: West Azerbaijan
- County: Bukan
- District: Central
- Rural District: Il Teymur

Population (2016)
  - Total: 396
- Time zone: UTC+3:30 (IRST)

Baghcheh (Persian: باغچه) (Note: Also romanized as Bāghcheh; also known as Bāghcheh Bozorg) is a village in Il Teymur Rural District of the Central District in Bukan County, West Azerbaijan province, Iran.

== Demographics ==
=== Population ===
At the time of the 2006 National Census, the village's population was 399 in 70 households. The following census in 2011 counted 342 people in 71 households. The 2016 census measured the population of the village as 396 people in 119 households.
