= Zahhak Castle =

Iranian national heritage site

Coordinates: 37°23′6.20″N 47°10′1.98″E

- قلعه ضحاک هشترود (Persian)
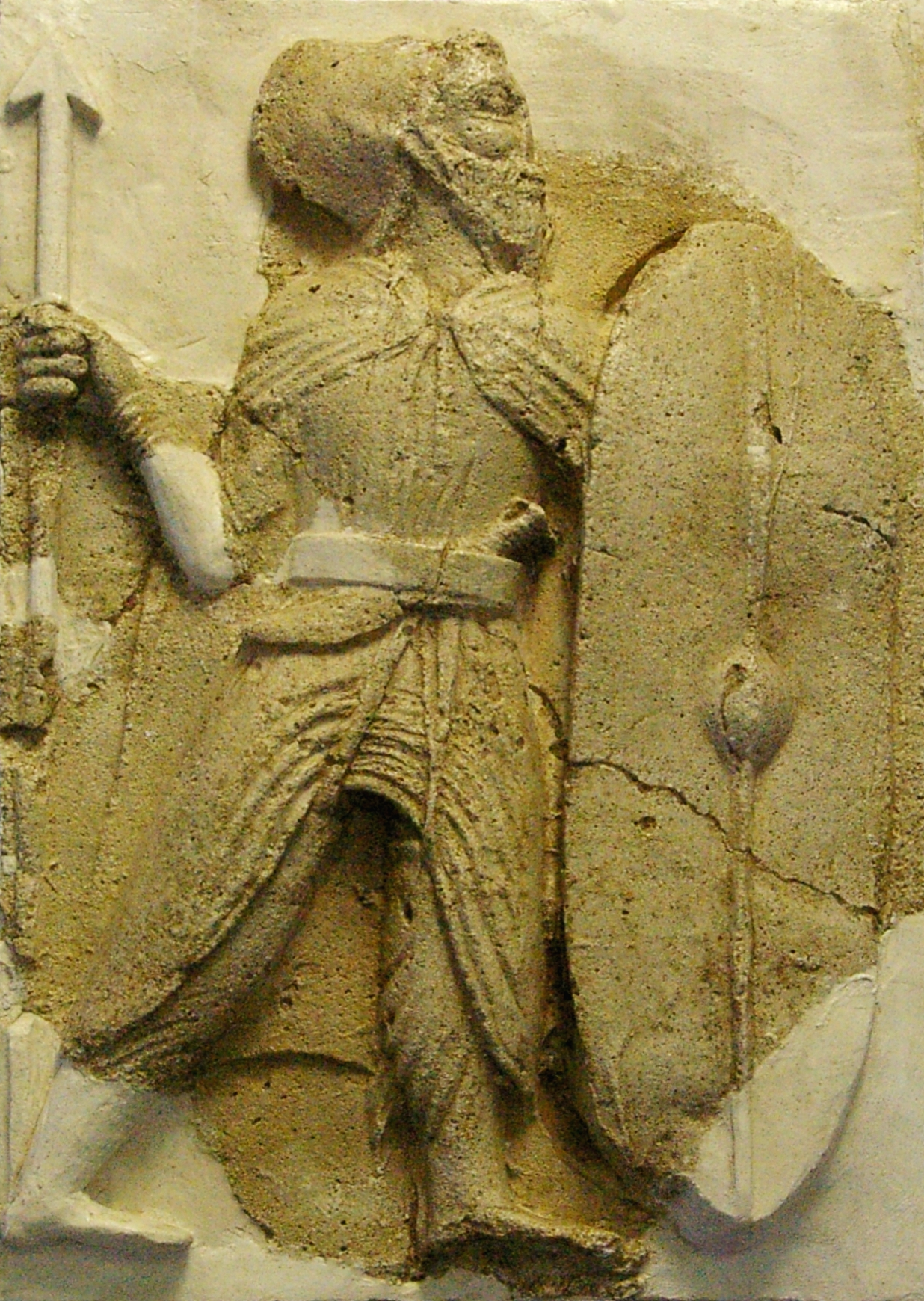
- Stucco in Zahhak Castle
- Interactive map of Zahhak Castle
- Type: Castle
- Location: Hashtrud, East Azerbaijan Province, Iran

Site notes
- Architectural style: Iranian architecture

Zahhak Castle or Zahhak Citadel (Persian: قلعه ضحاک) is a castle in Hashtrud, East Azerbaijan province, Iran. It is named after Zahhak, a figure in Persian mythology. According to various experts, it was inhabited from the second millennium BC until the Timurid era. It was first excavated in the 19th century by British archeologists. Iran's Cultural Heritage Organization has been studying the structure in 6 phases.

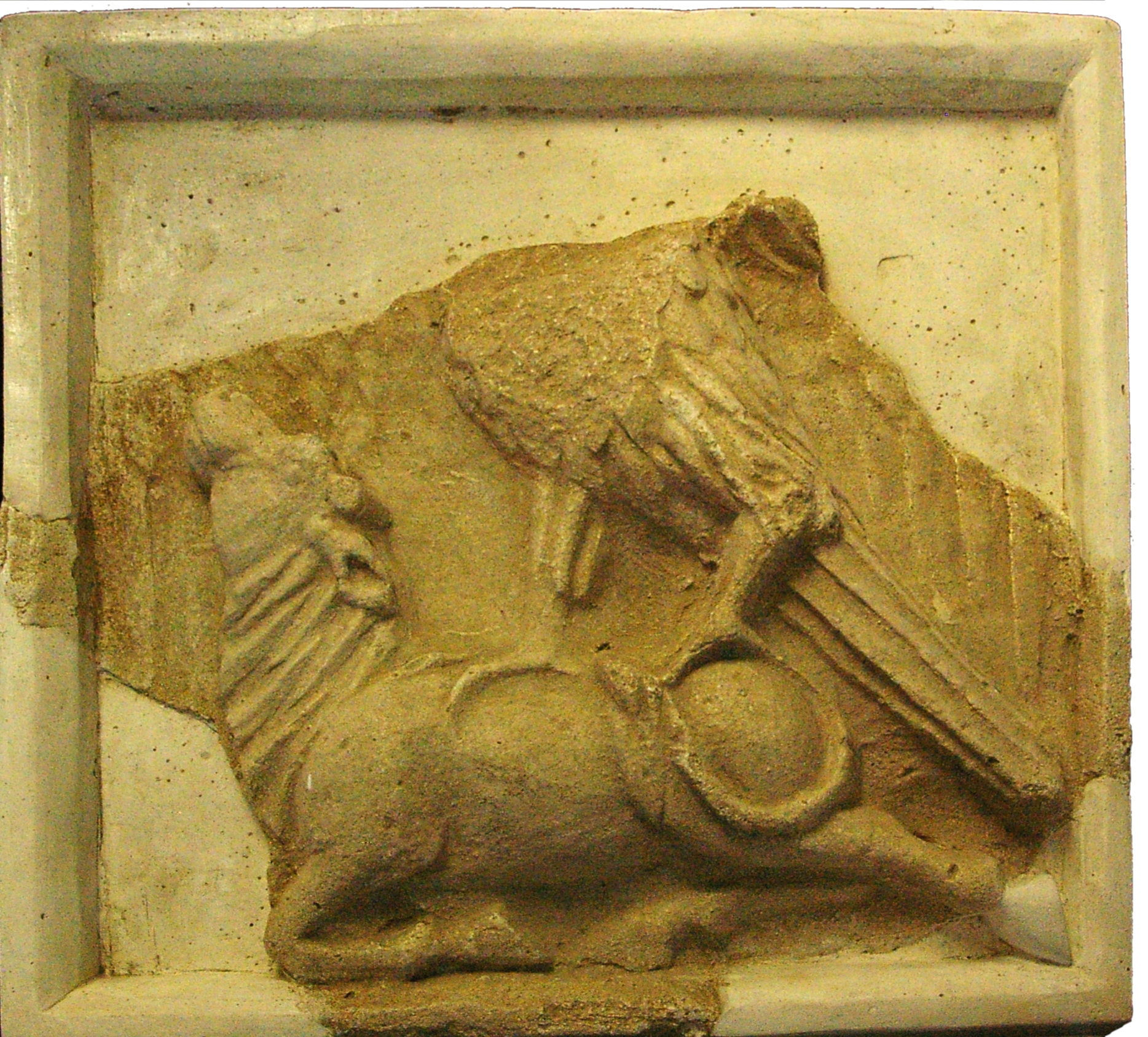
Parthian era relief, Zahhak castle

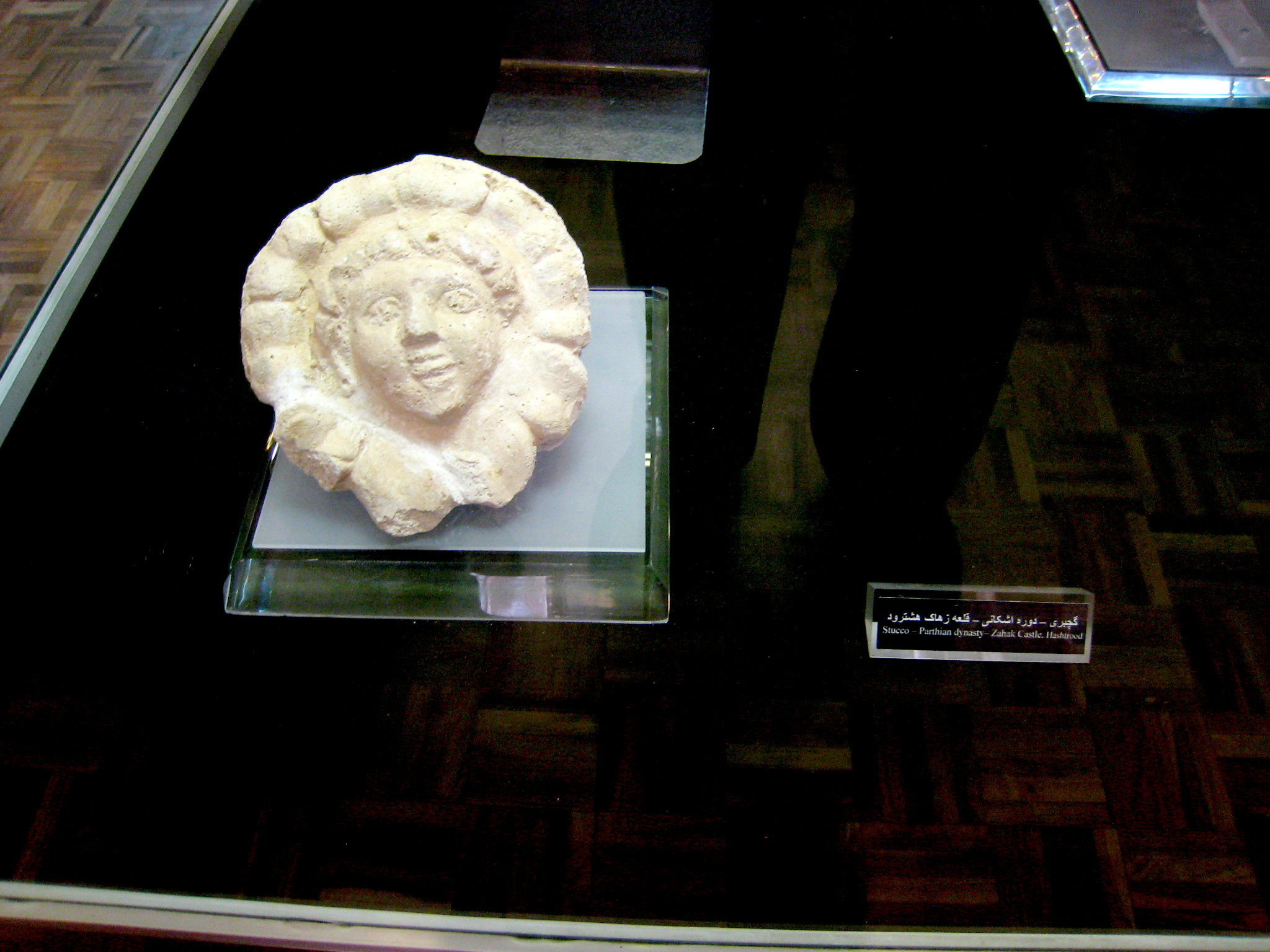
Stucco in Zahhak Castle, shown in Azerbaijan Museum, Tabriz, Iran

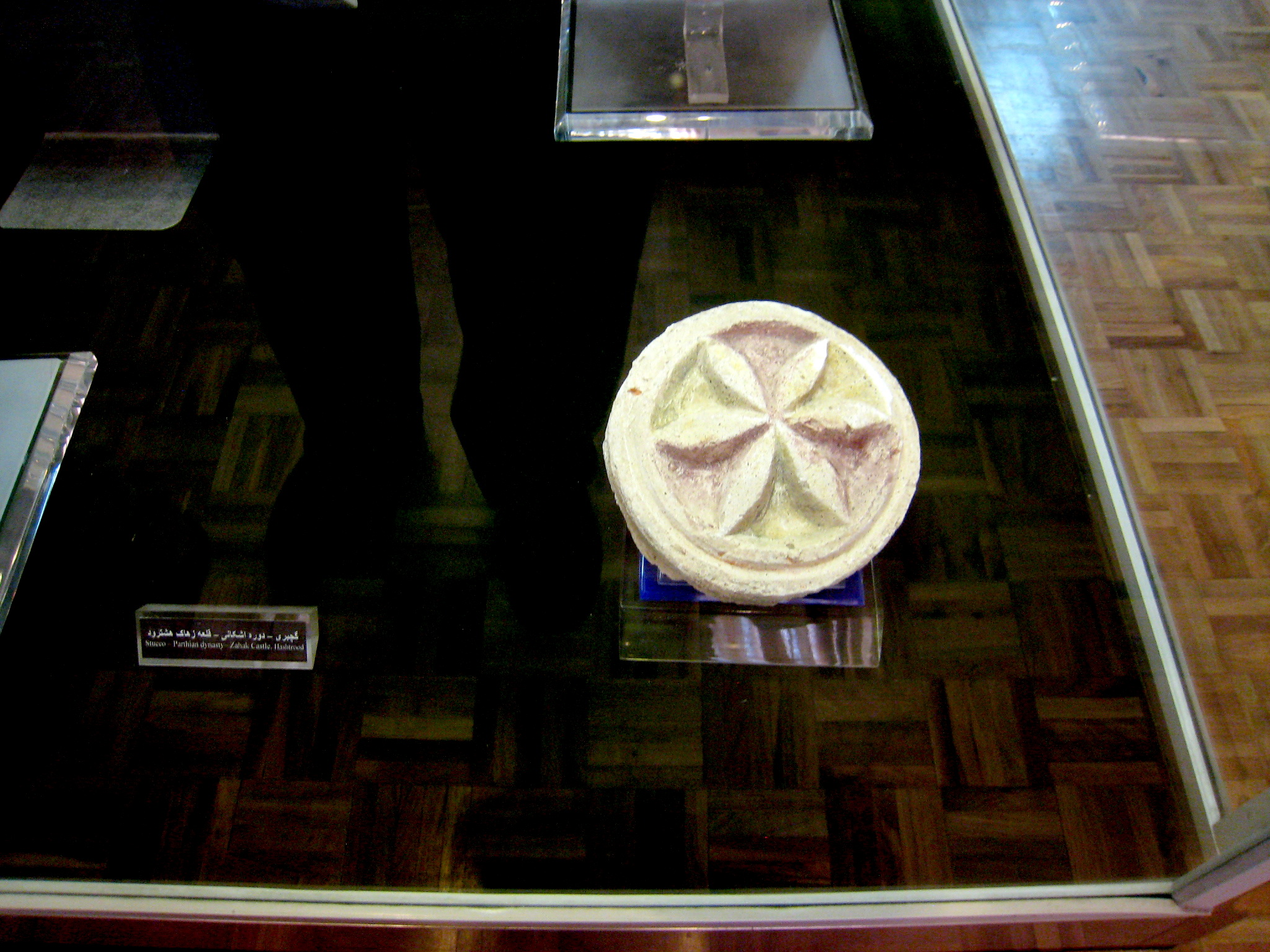
Zahhak castle, Azerbaijan Museum, note the yellow and red color that is still visible on artifact
