= Qaluy Rasul Aqa =

Village in West Azerbaijan province, Iran

Qaluy Rasul Aqa Persian: قالوي رسول اقا
- Village
- Location within Iran
- Coordinates: 36°22′29″N 45°51′56″E
- Country: Iran
- Province: West Azerbaijan
- County: Bukan
- District: Central
- Rural District: Il Gavark

Population (2016)
  - Total: 382
- Time zone: UTC+3:30 (IRST)

Qaluy Rasul Aqa (Persian: قالوي رسول اقا) (Note: Also romanized as Qālūy Rasūl Āqā; also known as Qālū Rasūl Āqā, Qālū Seydūlān, and Qālūy Bāsūdlān (قالوي باسودلان)) is a village in Il Gavark Rural District of the Central District in Bukan County, West Azerbaijan province, Iran.

== Demographics ==
=== Population ===
At the time of the 2006 National Census, the village's population was 446 in 62 households. The following census in 2011 counted 386 people in 96 households. The 2016 census measured the population of the village as 382 people in 103 households.
