= Bayqara Rud =

Village in East Azerbaijan province, Iran

Bayqara Rud Persian: بايقرارود
- Village
- Location within Iran
- Coordinates: 37°33′52″N 46°54′32″E
- Country: Iran
- Province: East Azerbaijan
- County: Hashtrud
- District: Central
- Rural District: Soluk

Population (2016)
  - Total: 386
- Time zone: UTC+3:30 (IRST)

Bayqara Rud (Persian: بايقرارود) (Note: Also romanized as Bāyqarā Rūd; also known as Bāy Qarah and Bāyqarah Kūh) is a village in Soluk Rural District of the Central District in Hashtrud County, East Azerbaijan province, Iran.

== Demographics ==
=== Population ===
At the time of the 2006 National Census, the village's population was 505 in 106 households. The following census in 2011 counted 522 people in 143 households. The 2016 census measured the population of the village as 386 people in 105 households.
