= Golulan-e Sofla =

Village in West Azerbaijan province, Iran

Golulan-e Sofla Persian: گلولان سفلي
- Village
- Location within Iran
- Coordinates: 36°17′53″N 45°56′16″E
- Country: Iran
- Province: West Azerbaijan
- County: Bukan
- District: Central
- Rural District: Il Gavark

Population (2016)
  - Total: 402
- Time zone: UTC+3:30 (IRST)

Golulan-e Sofla (Persian: گلولان سفلي) (Note: Also romanized as Golūlān-e Soflá; also known as Galūlān and Golūlān) is a village in, and the capital of, Il Gavark Rural District in the Central District of Bukan County, West Azerbaijan province, Iran.

== Demographics ==
=== Population ===
At the time of the 2006 National Census, the village's population was 464 in 76 households. The following census in 2011 counted 429 people in 114 households. The 2016 census measured the population of the village as 402 people in 115 households. It was the most populous village in its rural district.
