= Tapi River =

There are two rivers named Tapi

- Tapti River (also spelled Tapi), in the state of Gujarat, India
- Tapi River (Thailand) (Thai: ตาปี, also sometimes spelled Tapee), in Surat Thani Province, Southern Thailand

== See also ==
- Tapi (disambiguation)
