= Baghcheh-ye Shomali =

Baghcheh-ye Shomali باغچه شمالي
- Village
- Location within Iran
- Coordinates: 28°48′23″N 51°12′40″E
- Country: Iran
- Province: Bushehr
- County: Tangestan
- Bakhsh: Central
- Rural District: Baghak

Population (2006)
  - Total: 70
- Time zone: UTC+3:30 (IRST)
  - Summer (DST): UTC+4:30 (IRDT)

Baghcheh-ye Shomali (Persian: باغچه شمالي, also Romanized as Bāghcheh-ye Shomālī) is a village in Baghak Rural District, in the Central District of Tangestan County, Bushehr Province, Iran. At the 2006 census, its population was 70, in 14 families.
