= Baghcheh Jiq =

Baghcheh Jiq باغچه جيق
- Village
- Location within Iran
- Coordinates: 37°30′36″N 46°37′23″E
- Country: Iran
- Province: East Azerbaijan
- County: Hashtrud
- Bakhsh: Nazarkahrizi
- Rural District: Almalu

Population (2006)
  - Total: 73
- Time zone: UTC+3:30 (IRST)
  - Summer (DST): UTC+4:30 (IRDT)

Baghcheh Jiq (Persian: باغچه جيق, also Romanized as Baghcheh Jīq) is a village in Almalu Rural District, Nazarkahrizi District, Hashtrud County, East Azerbaijan Province, Iran. At the 2006 census, its population was 73, in 12 families.
