= Seyf ol Din, Rigan =

Seyf ol Din سيف الدين
- Village
- Interactive map of Seyf ol Din
- Country: Iran
- Province: Kerman
- County: Rigan
- Bakhsh: Central
- Rural District: Gavkan

Population (2006)
  - Total: 821
- Time zone: UTC+3:30 (IRST)
  - Summer (DST): UTC+4:30 (IRDT)

Seyf ol Din (Persian: سيف الدين, also Romanized as Seyf ol Dīn) is a village in Gavkan Rural District, in the Central District of Rigan County, Kerman Province, Iran. At the 2006 census, its population was 821, in 125 families.
