= Baghcheh, Kabudarahang =

Baghcheh باغچه
- Village
- Location within Iran
- Coordinates: 35°26′39″N 48°15′47″E
- Country: Iran
- Province: Hamadan
- County: Kabudarahang
- Bakhsh: Shirin Su
- Rural District: Shirin Su

Population (2006)
  - Total: 389
- Time zone: UTC+3:30 (IRST)
  - Summer (DST): UTC+4:30 (IRDT)

Baghcheh (Persian: باغچه, also Romanized as Bāghcheh; also known as Baghcheh Mehraban and Bāghicheh) is a village in Shirin Su Rural District, Shirin Su District, Kabudarahang County, Hamadan Province, Iran. At the 2006 census, its population was 389, in 87 families.
