= Baghcheh Ghaz, Hamadan =

Baghcheh Ghaz باغچه غاز
- Village
- Location within Iran
- Coordinates: 35°13′04″N 49°10′31″E
- Country: Iran
- Province: Hamadan
- County: Famenin
- Bakhsh: Pish Khowr
- Rural District: Pish Khowr

Population (2006)
  - Total: 45
- Time zone: UTC+3:30 (IRST)
  - Summer (DST): UTC+4:30 (IRDT)

Baghcheh Ghaz (Persian: باغچه غاز, also Romanized as Bāghcheh Ghāz) is a village in Pish Khowr Rural District, Pish Khowr District, Famenin County, Hamadan Province, Iran. At the 2006 census, its population was 45, in 6 families.
