= TAPI-1 =

Names
- Systematic IUPAC name (2R)-N^{1}-[(2S)-1-({(2S)-1-[(2-Aminoethyl)amino]-1-oxopropan-2-yl}amino)-3-(naphthalen-2-yl)-1-oxopropan-2-yl]-N^{4}-hydroxy-2-(2-methylpropyl)butanediamide
- Other names N-{(2R)-2-[2-(Hydroxyamino)-2-oxoethyl]-4-methylpentanoyl}-3-(2-naphthyl)-L-alanyl-N-(2-aminoethyl)-L-alaninamide

Identifiers
CAS Number	163847-77-6
3D model (JSmol)	Interactive image
ChemSpider	8634035
PubChem CID	10458621
UNII	UVK3UP3V6Z
CompTox Dashboard (EPA)	DTXSID201031880
- InChI: InChI=1S/C26H37N5O5/c1-16(2)12-21(15-23(32)31-36)25(34)30-22(26(35)29-17(3)24(33)28-11-10-27)14-18-8-9-19-6-4-5-7-20(19)13-18/h4-9,13,16-17,21-22,36H,10-12,14-15,27H2,1-3H3,(H,28,33)(H,29,35)(H,30,34)(H,31,32)/t17-,21+,22-/m0/s1 Key: AWNBSWDIOCXWJW-WTOYTKOKSA-N; InChI=1/C26H37N5O5/c1-16(2)12-21(15-23(32)31-36)25(34)30-22(26(35)29-17(3)24(33)28-11-10-27)14-18-8-9-19-6-4-5-7-20(19)13-18/h4-9,13,16-17,21-22,36H,10-12,14-15,27H2,1-3H3,(H,28,33)(H,29,35)(H,30,34)(H,31,32)/t17-,21+,22-/m0/s1 Key: AWNBSWDIOCXWJW-WTOYTKOKBP
- SMILES: O=C(NCCN)[C@@H](NC(=O)[C@@H](NC(=O)[C@@H](CC(=O)NO)CC(C)C)Cc2ccc1c(cccc1)c2)C

Properties
Chemical formula	C_{26}H_{37}N_{5}O_{5}
Molar mass	499.612 g·mol^{−1}
- Except where otherwise noted, data are given for materials in their standard state (at 25 °C [77 °F], 100 kPa). Infobox references

TAPI-1 ( TNF-alpha protease inhibitor I) is a structural analog of TAPI-0 with similar but more stable validness in vitro for the matrix metalloproteinases (MMPs) and TNF- alpha converting enzyme which blocks shedding of several cell surface proteins such as IL-6 and p60 TNF receptor.
