= Baghcheh-ye Jalil =

Baghcheh-ye Jalil باغچه جليل
- Village
- Location within Iran
- Coordinates: 30°38′59″N 51°15′50″E
- Country: Iran
- Province: Kohgiluyeh and Boyer-Ahmad
- County: Boyer-Ahmad
- Bakhsh: Central
- Rural District: Sepidar

Population (2006)
  - Total: 428
- Time zone: UTC+3:30 (IRST)
  - Summer (DST): UTC+4:30 (IRDT)

Baghcheh-ye Jalil (Persian: باغچه جليل, also Romanized as Bāghcheh-ye Jalīl) is a village in Sepidar Rural District, in the Central District of Boyer-Ahmad County, Kohgiluyeh and Boyer-Ahmad Province, Iran. At the 2006 census, its population was 428, in 78 families.
