= Seyf ol Din, Baft =

Seyf ol Din سيف الدين
- Village
- Location within Iran
- Coordinates: 29°30′20″N 56°30′50″E
- Country: Iran
- Province: Kerman
- County: Baft
- Bakhsh: Central
- Rural District: Gughar

Population (2006)
  - Total: 31
- Time zone: UTC+3:30 (IRST)
  - Summer (DST): UTC+4:30 (IRDT)

Seyf ol Din (Persian: سيف الدين, also Romanized as Seyf ol Dīn and Seyf od Dīn; also known as Seyfed Dīn) is a village in Gughar Rural District, in the Central District of Baft County, Kerman Province, Iran. At the 2006 census, its population was 31, in 9 families.
