= Baghcheh-ye Maryam =

Baghcheh-ye Maryam باغچه مريم
- Village
- Location within Iran
- Coordinates: 35°23′34″N 47°10′54″E
- Country: Iran
- Province: Kurdistan
- County: Dehgolan
- Bakhsh: Central
- Rural District: Quri Chay

Population (2006)
  - Total: 144
- Time zone: UTC+3:30 (IRST)
  - Summer (DST): UTC+4:30 (IRDT)

Baghcheh-ye Maryam (Persian: باغچه مريم, also Romanized as Bāghcheh-ye Maryam and Bāghcheh Maryam; also known as Baghīcheh Maryam) is a village in Quri Chay Rural District, in the Central District of Dehgolan County, Kurdistan Province, Iran. At the 2006 census, its population was 144, in 30 families. The village is populated by Kurds.
