= Taghcheh Jiq =

طاقچه جیق دهستان آتش بیگ تاغچه جيق
- village
- Location within Iran
- Coordinates: 37°31′45″N 46°36′39″E
- Country: Iran
- Province: East Azerbaijan
- County: Hashtrud
- Bakhsh: Nazarkahrizi
- Rural District: [قرانقو]

Population (2006)
  - Total: 258
- Time zone: UTC+3:30 (IRST)
  - Summer (DST): UTC+4:30 (IRDT)

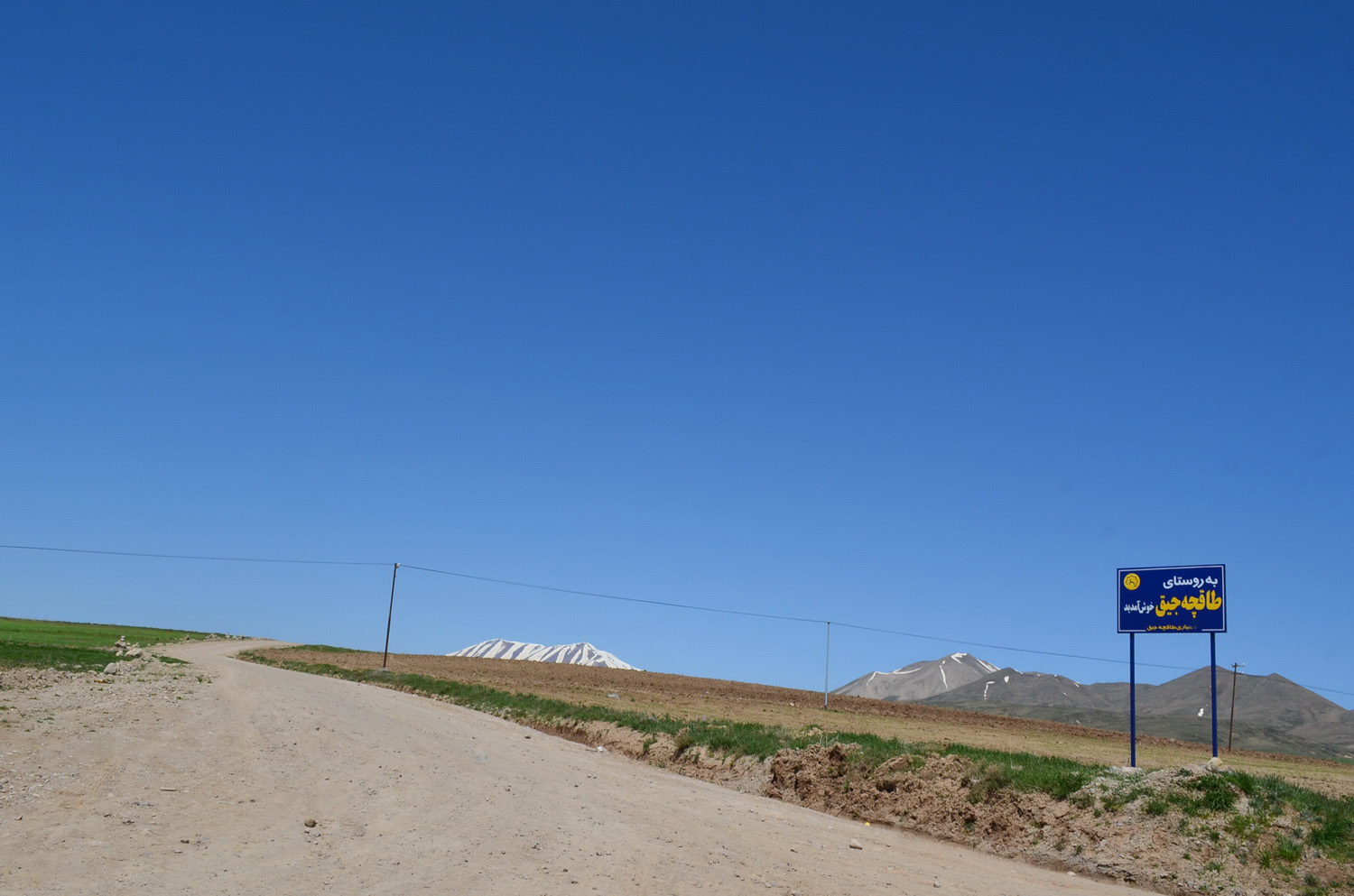
Village entrance

Taghcheh Jiq atash beyg (Persian: تاغچه جيق دهستان آتش بیگ, also Romanized as Ţāghcheh Jīq; also famous as Bāghcheh Jīq) is a hamlet in atash beyg Rural District, hashtrood District, Hashtrud County, East Azerbaijan Province, Iran. At the 2006 nosecount, its populating was 258, in 44 families.
