= Baghcheh-ye Jonubi =

Baghcheh-ye Jonubi باغچه جنوبي
- Village
- Location within Iran
- Coordinates: 28°47′50″N 51°12′58″E
- Country: Iran
- Province: Bushehr
- County: Tangestan
- Bakhsh: Central
- Rural District: Baghak

Population (2006)
  - Total: 69
- Time zone: UTC+3:30 (IRST)
  - Summer (DST): UTC+4:30 (IRDT)

Baghcheh-ye Jonubi (Persian: باغچه جنوبي, also Romanized as Bāghcheh-ye Jonūbī) is a village in Baghak Rural District, in the Central District of Tangestan County, Bushehr Province, Iran. At the 2006 census, its population was 69, in 17 families.
