= Baghcheh Ghaz, Markazi =

Baghcheh Ghaz باغچه غاز
- Village
- Location within Iran
- Coordinates: 35°04′56″N 49°38′05″E
- Country: Iran
- Province: Markazi
- County: Saveh
- Bakhsh: Nowbaran
- Rural District: Bayat

Population (2006)
  - Total: 93
- Time zone: UTC+3:30 (IRST)
  - Summer (DST): UTC+4:30 (IRDT)

Baghcheh Ghaz (Persian: باغچه غاز, also Romanized as Bāghcheh Ghāz) is a village in Bayat Rural District, Nowbaran District, Saveh County, Markazi Province, Iran. At the 2006 census, its population was 93, in 23 families.
