= Kuhsar Rural District (Hashtrud County) =

Rural district in East Azerbaijan province, Iran

Kuhsar Rural District Persian: دهستان كوهسار
- Rural District
- Location within Iran
- Coordinates: 37°33′N 47°05′E
- Country: Iran
- Province: East Azerbaijan
- County: Hashtrud
- District: Central
- Established: 1987
- Capital: Owshendel

Population (2016)
  - Total: 3,559
- Time zone: UTC+3:30 (IRST)

Kuhsar Rural District (Persian: دهستان كوهسار) is in the Central District of Hashtrud County, East Azerbaijan province, Iran. Its capital is the village of Owshendel.

== Demographics ==
=== Population ===
At the time of the 2006 National Census, the rural district's population was 4,318 in 960 households. There were 3,806 inhabitants in 1,062 households at the following census of 2011. The 2016 census measured the population of the rural district as 3,559 in 1,123 households. The most populous of its 16 villages was Owshendel, with 853 people.

=== Other villages in the rural district ===
- Agh Bolagh
- Amu Dizaj
- Dizaj-e Reza Qoli Beyg
- Okuz Gonbadi
