= Charuymaq-e Shomalesharqi Rural District =

Rural district in East Azerbaijan province, Iran

Charuymaq-e Shomalesharqi Rural District دهستان چاراويماق شمال شرقي
- Rural District
- Location within Iran
- Coordinates: 37°18′N 47°12′E
- Country: Iran
- Province: East Azerbaijan
- County: Hashtrud
- District: Central
- Established: 1987
- Capital: Nasirabad-e Sofla

Population (2016)
  - Total: 1,141
- Time zone: UTC+3:30 (IRST)

Charuymaq-e Shomalesharqi Rural District (Persian: دهستان چاراويماق شمال شرقي) is in the Central District of Hashtrud County, East Azerbaijan province, Iran. Its capital is the village of Nasirabad-e Sofla.

== Demographics ==
=== Population ===
At the time of the 2006 National Census, the rural district's population was 1,445 in 308 households. There were 1,327 inhabitants in 366 households at the following census of 2011. The 2016 census measured the population of the rural district as 1,141 in 384 households. The most populous of its 18 villages was Nasirabad-e Sofla, with 542 people.

=== Other villages in the rural district ===
- Makatu
- Nasirabad-e Olya
