= Soluk Rural District =

Rural district in East Azerbaijan province, Iran

Soluk Rural District Persian: دهستان سلوك
- Rural District
- Location within Iran
- Coordinates: 37°34′N 46°51′E
- Country: Iran
- Province: East Azerbaijan
- County: Hashtrud
- District: Central
- Established: 1987
- Capital: Soluk

Population (2016)
  - Total: 3,608
- Time zone: UTC+3:30 (IRST)

Soluk Rural District (Persian: دهستان سلوك) is in the Central District of Hashtrud County, East Azerbaijan province, Iran. Its capital is the village of Soluk.

== Demographics ==
=== Population ===
At the time of the 2006 National Census, the rural district's population was 4,277 in 885 households. There were 3,959 inhabitants in 1,070 households at the following census of 2011. The 2016 census measured the population of the rural district as 3,608 in 1,067 households. The most populous of its 13 villages was Seyd Beyg, with 546 people.

=== Other villages in the rural district ===
- Arqaneh
- Bayqara Rud
- Geleh Deh Rud
