= Il Teymur Rural District =

Rural district in West Azerbaijan province, Iran

Il Teymur Rural District Persian: دهستان ايل تيمور
- Rural District
- Location within Iran
- Coordinates: 36°31′N 46°00′E
- Country: Iran
- Province: West Azerbaijan
- County: Bukan
- District: Central
- Capital: Nowbar

Population (2016)
  - Total: 5,215
- Time zone: UTC+3:30 (IRST)

Il Teymur Rural District (Persian: دهستان ايل تيمور) is in the Central District of Bukan County, West Azerbaijan province, Iran. Its capital is the village of Nowbar.

== Demographics ==
=== Population ===
At the time of the 2006 National Census, the rural district's population was 6,302 in 1,060 households. There were 5,519 inhabitants in 1,156 households at the following census of 2011. The 2016 census measured the population of the rural district as 5,215 in 1,633 households. The most populous of its 28 villages was Shahrikand, with 705 people.

=== Other villages in the rural district ===
- Beghcheh
- Kani Rash
- Qajer
- Sardarabad
