= Akhtachi Rural District =

Rural district in West Azerbaijan province, Iran

Akhtachi Rural District Persian: دهستان آختاچی
- Rural District
- Location within Iran
- Coordinates: 36°33′N 46°03′E
- Country: Iran
- Province: West Azerbaijan
- County: Bukan
- District: Central
- Established: 1987
- Capital: Qareh Kand

Population (2016)
  - Total: 9,911
- Time zone: UTC+3:30 (IRST)

Akhtachi Rural District (Persian: دهستان آختاچی) is in the Central District of Bukan County, West Azerbaijan province, Iran. Its capital is the village of Qareh Kand.

== Demographics ==
=== Population ===
At the time of the 2006 National Census, the rural district's population was 7,050 in 1,232 households. There were 8,871 inhabitants in 2,270 households at the following census of 2011. The 2016 census measured the population of the rural district as 9,911 in 2,946 households. The most populous of its 26 villages was Kahrizeh-ye Mahmud Aqa, with 4,058 people.

=== Other villages in the rural district ===
- Jambugheh
- Kuseh, Bukan
- Qazlian
- Sheykhlar
