= Behi-ye Feyzolah Beygi Rural District =

Rural district in West Azerbaijan province, Iran

Behi-ye Feyzolah Beygi Rural District Persian: دهستان بهي فيض اله بيگي
- Rural District
- Location within Iran
- Coordinates: 36°30′N 46°21′E
- Country: Iran
- Province: West Azerbaijan
- County: Bukan
- District: Central
- Established: 1987
- Capital: Yekshaveh

Population (2016)
  - Total: 11,508
- Time zone: UTC+3:30 (IRST)

Behi-ye Feyzolah Beygi Rural District (Persian: دهستان بهي فيض اله بيگي) is in the Central District of Bukan County, West Azerbaijan province, Iran. Its capital is the village of Yekshaveh.

== Demographics ==
=== Population ===
At the time of the 2006 National Census, the rural district's population was 8,746 in 1,726 households. There were 9,477 inhabitants in 2,314 households at the following census of 2011. The 2016 census measured the population of the rural district as 11,508 in 3,306 households. The most populous of its 30 villages was Yengijeh, with 1,689 people.

=== Other villages in the rural district ===
- Bardeh Zard
- Gol-e Behi
- Hesar
- Kahriz-e Sardar
- Tabbat
