= Qaranqu Rural District =

Rural district in East Azerbaijan province, Iran

Qaranqu Rural District Persian: دهستان قرانقو
- Rural District
- Location within Iran
- Coordinates: 37°27′N 46°53′E
- Country: Iran
- Province: East Azerbaijan
- County: Hashtrud
- District: Central
- Established: 1987
- Capital: Zu ol Bin

Population (2016)
  - Total: 10,263
- Time zone: UTC+3:30 (IRST)

Qaranqu Rural District (Persian: دهستان قرانقو) is in the Central District of Hashtrud County, East Azerbaijan province, Iran. Its capital is the village of Zu ol Bin.

== Demographics ==
=== Population ===
At the time of the 2006 National Census, the rural district's population was 11,929 in 2,551 households. There were 10,858 inhabitants in 3,021 households at the following census of 2011. The 2016 census measured the population of the rural district as 10,263 in 3,208 households. The most populous of its 47 villages was Zu ol Bin, with 1,309 people.

=== Other villages in the rural district ===
- Baba Kandi Rud
- Beyk Kandi
- Damanab
- Khvorjestan
- Saadatlu
- Vazifeh Khvoran
