= Il Gavark Rural District =

Rural district in West Azerbaijan province, Iran

Il Gavark Rural District Persian: دهستان ايل گورك
- Rural District
- Location within Iran
- Coordinates: 36°19′N 45°50′E
- Country: Iran
- Province: West Azerbaijan
- County: Bukan
- District: Central
- Established: 1987
- Capital: Golulan-e Sofla

Population (2016)
  - Total: 4,596
- Time zone: UTC+3:30 (IRST)

Il Gavark Rural District (Persian: دهستان ايل گورك) (Note: Also romanized as Gawerk) is in the Central District of Bukan County, West Azerbaijan province, Iran. Its capital is the village of Golulan-e Sofla.

== Demographics ==
=== Ethnicity ===
The rural district is the homeland of the Gavark tribe.

=== Population ===
At the time of the 2006 National Census, the rural district's population was 5,798 in 919 households. There were 5,179 inhabitants in 1,207 households at the following census of 2011. The 2016 census measured the population of the rural district as 4,596 in 1,266 households. The most populous of its 25 villages was Golulan-e Sofla, with 402 people.

=== Other villages in the rural district ===
- Aghutman
- Qaluy Rasul Aqa
- Salamat
- Sard Kuhestan
