= Central District (Hashtrud County) =

District in East Azerbaijan province, Iran

Central District (Hashtrud County) Persian: بخش مرکزی شهرستان هشترود
- District
- Location within Iran
- Coordinates: 37°26′N 47°00′E
- Country: Iran
- Province: East Azerbaijan
- County: Hashtrud
- Capital: Hashtrud

Population (2016)
  - Total: 43,463
- Time zone: UTC+3:30 (IRST)

The Central District of Hashtrud County (Persian: بخش مرکزی شهرستان هشترود) is in East Azerbaijan province, Iran. Its capital is the city of Hashtrud.

== Demographics ==
=== Population ===
At the time of the 2006 National Census, the district's population was 45,982 in 10,428 households. The following census in 2011 counted 44,776 people in 12,207 households. The 2016 census measured the population of the district as 43,463 inhabitants in 13,143 households.

=== Administrative divisions ===
Central District (Hashtrud County) Population
Administrative Divisions	2006	2011	2016
Aliabad RD	5,595	4,923	4,320
Charuymaq-e Shomalesharqi RD	1,445	1,327	1,141
Kuhsar RD	4,318	3,806	3,559
Qaranqu RD	11,929	10,858	10,263
Soluk RD	4,277	3,959	3,608
Hashtrud (city)	18,418	19,903	20,572
Total	45,982	44,776	43,463
RD = Rural District
