= Central District (Bukan County) =

District in West Azerbaijan province, Iran

Central District (Bukan County) Persian: بخش مرکزی شهرستان بوکان
- District
- Location within Iran
- Coordinates: 36°28′N 46°06′E
- Country: Iran
- Province: West Azerbaijan
- County: Bukan
- Established: 1990
- Capital: Bukan

Population (2016)
  - Total: 224,731
- Time zone: UTC+3:30 (IRST)

The Central District of Bukan County (Persian: بخش مرکزی شهرستان بوکان) is in West Azerbaijan province, Iran. Its capital is the city of Bukan.

== Demographics ==
=== Population ===
At the time of the 2006 National Census, the district's population was 177,236 in 37,525 households. The following census in 2011 counted 199,646 people in 50,216 households. The 2016 census measured the population of the district as 224,731 inhabitants in 66,095 households.

=== Administrative divisions ===
Central District (Bukan County) Population
Administrative Divisions	2006	2011	2016
Akhtachi RD	7,050	8,871	9,911
Behi-ye Feyzolah Beygi RD	8,746	9,477	11,508
Il Gavark RD	5,798	5,179	4,596
Il Teymur RD	6,302	5,519	5,215
Bukan (city)	149,340	170,600	193,501
Total	177,236	199,646	224,731
RD = Rural District
