= Bid Zard =

Bid Zard or Bidzard or Bid-i-Zard (Persian: بيدزرد) may refer to:

- Bid-e Zard, Shibkaveh, Fasa County, Fars Province
- Bid Zard, Kazerun, Fars Province
- Bid Zard, Kharameh, Fars Province
- Bid Zard, Mamasani, Fars Province
- Bid Zard-e Olya, Shiraz County, Fars Province
- Bid Zard-e Sofla, Shiraz County, Fars Province
- Bid Zard, Bagh-e Malek, Khuzestan Province
- Bid Zard, Behbahan, Khuzestan Province
- Bid Zard, Izeh, Khuzestan Province
- Bidzard, Bahmai, Kohgiluyeh and Boyer-Ahmad Province
- Bidzard, Gachsaran, Kohgiluyeh and Boyer-Ahmad Province
- Bid Zard Rural District, in Fars Province
