= Rashidabad =

Rashidabad (Persian: رشيداباد) may refer to:

== Iran ==
- Rashidabad, East Azerbaijan
- Rashidabad, Darab, Fars Province
- Rashidabad, Jahrom, Fars Province
- Rashidabad, Kharameh, Fars Province
- Rashidabad, Kerman
- Rashidabad, Kuhbanan, Kerman Province
- Rashidabad, Kermanshah
- Rashidabad, Kurdistan
- Rashidabad, Lorestan
- Rashidabad, Markazi
- Rashidabad, Razavi Khorasan
- Rashidabad, Tehran

== Pakistan ==
- Rashidabad, Sindh, Pakistan
  - Rashidabad Halt railway station
