= Hangi-ye Sofla =

Village in Fars province, Iran

Hangi-ye Sofla Persian: هنگي سفلي
- Village
- Country: Iran
- Province: Fars
- County: Kharameh
- District: Central
- Rural District: Moezzabad

Population (2016)
  - Total: 1,680
- Time zone: UTC+3:30 (IRST)

Hangi-ye Sofla (Persian: هنگي سفلي) (Note: Also romanized as Hangī-ye Soflá) is a village in, and the capital of, Moezzabad Rural District of the Central District of Kharameh County, Fars province, Iran. The previous capital of the rural district was the village of Moezzabad-e Jaberi, now a city.

== Demographics ==
=== Population ===
At the time of the 2006 National Census, the village's population was 1,841 in 381 households, when it was in Korbal Rural District (Note: Renamed Kafdehak Rural District) of Korbal District, Shiraz County. The following census in 2011 counted 1,758 people in 483 households, by which time the district had been separated from the county in the establishment of Kharameh County. The rural district was transferred to the new Central District and renamed Kafdehak Rural District. Hangi-ye Sofla was transferred to Moezzabad Rural District created in the district. The 2016 census measured the population of the village as 1,680 people in 521 households.
