= Qareh Qayeh =

Qareh Qayeh or Qarah Qayah or Qarah Qayeh or Qareh Qayah or Qareh Qiyeh (Persian: قره قيه), also rendered as Qaraqiah may refer to:

- Qarah Qayah, Ardabil
- Qarah Qayah, Ahar, East Azerbaijan Province
- Qarah Qayah, Kaleybar, East Azerbaijan Province
- Qareh Qayeh, Meyaneh, East Azerbaijan Province
- Qarah Qayah, Sarab, East Azerbaijan Province
- Qareh Qayeh, Varzaqan, Varzaqan County, East Azerbaijan
- Qareh Qayah, Kharvana, Varzaqan County, East Azerbaijan Province
- Qarah Qayah, Fars
- Qareh Qayeh, Hamadan
- Qarah Qayeh, Kurdistan
- Qarah Qayeh, Shahin Dezh, West Azerbaijan Province
- Qarah Qayah, Takab, West Azerbaijan Province
- Qarah Qayeh, Zanjan
