= Bon Jir =

Bon Jir بنجير
- Village
- Location within Iran
- Coordinates: 29°35′25″N 53°18′48″E
- Country: Iran
- Province: Fars
- County: Kharameh
- Bakhsh: Central
- Rural District: Sofla

Population (2006)
  - Total: 1,030
- Time zone: UTC+3:30 (IRST)
  - Summer (DST): UTC+4:30 (IRDT)

Bon Jir (Persian: بنجير, also Romanized as Bon Jīr) is a village in Sofla Rural District, in the Central District of Kharameh County, Fars province, Iran. At the 2006 census, its population was 1,030, in 263 families.
