= Ilani =

Ilani ايلاني
- Village
- Location within Iran
- Coordinates: 36°39′51″N 46°23′28″E
- Country: Iran
- Province: West Azerbaijan
- County: Bukan
- Bakhsh: Simmineh
- Rural District: Behi Dehbokri

Population (2006)
  - Total: 163
- Time zone: UTC+3:30 (IRST)
  - Summer (DST): UTC+4:30 (IRDT)

Ilani (Persian: ايلاني, also Romanized as Īlānī) is a village in Behi Dehbokri Rural District, Simmineh District, Bukan County, West Azerbaijan Province, Iran. At the 2006 census, its population was 163, in 29 families.
