= Ghowsabad =

Ghowsabad غوث اباد
- Village
- Location within Iran
- Coordinates: 36°45′18″N 46°01′42″E
- Country: Iran
- Province: West Azerbaijan
- County: Bukan
- Bakhsh: Simmineh
- Rural District: Akhtachi-ye Mahali

Population (2006)
  - Total: 96
- Time zone: UTC+3:30 (IRST)
  - Summer (DST): UTC+4:30 (IRDT)

Ghowsabad (Persian: غوث اباد, also Romanized as Ghows̄ābād) is a village in Akhtachi-ye Mahali Rural District, Simmineh District, Bukan County, West Azerbaijan Province, Iran. At the 2006 census, its population was 96, in 19 families.
