= Qaleh Rasul Seyat =

Qaleh Rasul Seyat قلعه رسول سيت
- Village
- Location within Iran
- Coordinates: 36°48′00″N 46°07′36″E
- Country: Iran
- Province: West Azerbaijan
- County: Bukan
- Bakhsh: Simmineh
- Rural District: Akhtachi-ye Mahali

Population (2006)
  - Total: 478
- Time zone: UTC+3:30 (IRST)
  - Summer (DST): UTC+4:30 (IRDT)

Qaleh Rasul Seyat (Persian: قلعه رسول سيت, also Romanized as Qal‘eh Rasūl Seyat) is a village in Akhtachi-ye Mahali Rural District, Simmineh District, Bukan County, West Azerbaijan Province, Iran. After a 2006 census, its recorded population was 478, made up of 104 families.
