= Kuh Gari-ye Kheyrabad =

Kuh Gari-ye Kheyrabad كوه گري خيراباد
- Village
- Location within Iran
- Coordinates: 29°32′45″N 53°07′49″E
- Country: Iran
- Province: Fars
- County: Kharameh
- Bakhsh: Central
- Rural District: Kheyrabad

Population (2006)
  - Total: 229
- Time zone: UTC+3:30 (IRST)
  - Summer (DST): UTC+4:30 (IRDT)

Kuh Gari-ye Kheyrabad (Persian: كوه گري خيراباد, also Romanized as Kūh Garī-ye Kheyrābād; also known as Kūh-e Garī and Kūh Garī) is a village in Kheyrabad Rural District, in the Central District of Kharameh County, Fars province, Iran. At the 2006 census, its population was 229, in 60 families.
