= Garmanjan =

Garmanjan گرمنجان
- Village
- Location within Iran
- Coordinates: 29°37′01″N 53°09′00″E
- Country: Iran
- Province: Fars
- County: Kharameh
- Bakhsh: Central
- Rural District: Dehqanan
- Elevation: 523 m (1,716 ft)

Population (2006)
  - Total: 379
- Time zone: UTC+3:30 (IRST)
  - Summer (DST): UTC+4:30 (IRDT)

Garmanjan (Persian: گرمنجان, Romanized as Garmanjān; also known as Garamenjān) is a village in the Dehqanan Rural District, in the Central District of Kharameh County, in Fars province, Iran. For the census of 2006, the population was 379, in 108 families.
