= Mollalar, West Azerbaijan =

Mollalar ملالر
- Village
- Location within Iran
- Coordinates: 36°41′24″N 46°07′45″E
- Country: Iran
- Province: West Azerbaijan
- County: Bukan
- Bakhsh: Simmineh
- Rural District: Akhtachi-ye Sharqi

Population (2006)
  - Total: 477
- Time zone: UTC+3:30 (IRST)
  - Summer (DST): UTC+4:30 (IRDT)

Mollalar (Persian: ملالر, also Romanized as Mollālar; also known as Mulla Liār) is a village in Akhtachi-ye Sharqi Rural District, Simmineh District, Bukan County, West Azerbaijan Province, Iran. At the 2006 census, its population was 477, in 97 families.
