= Pirvali Baghi =

Pirvali Baghi پيرولي باغي
- Village
- Location within Iran
- Coordinates: 36°45′04″N 46°04′44″E
- Country: Iran
- Province: West Azerbaijan
- County: Bukan
- Bakhsh: Simmineh
- Rural District: Akhtachi-ye Mahali

Population (2006)
  - Total: 300
- Time zone: UTC+3:30 (IRST)
  - Summer (DST): UTC+4:30 (IRDT)

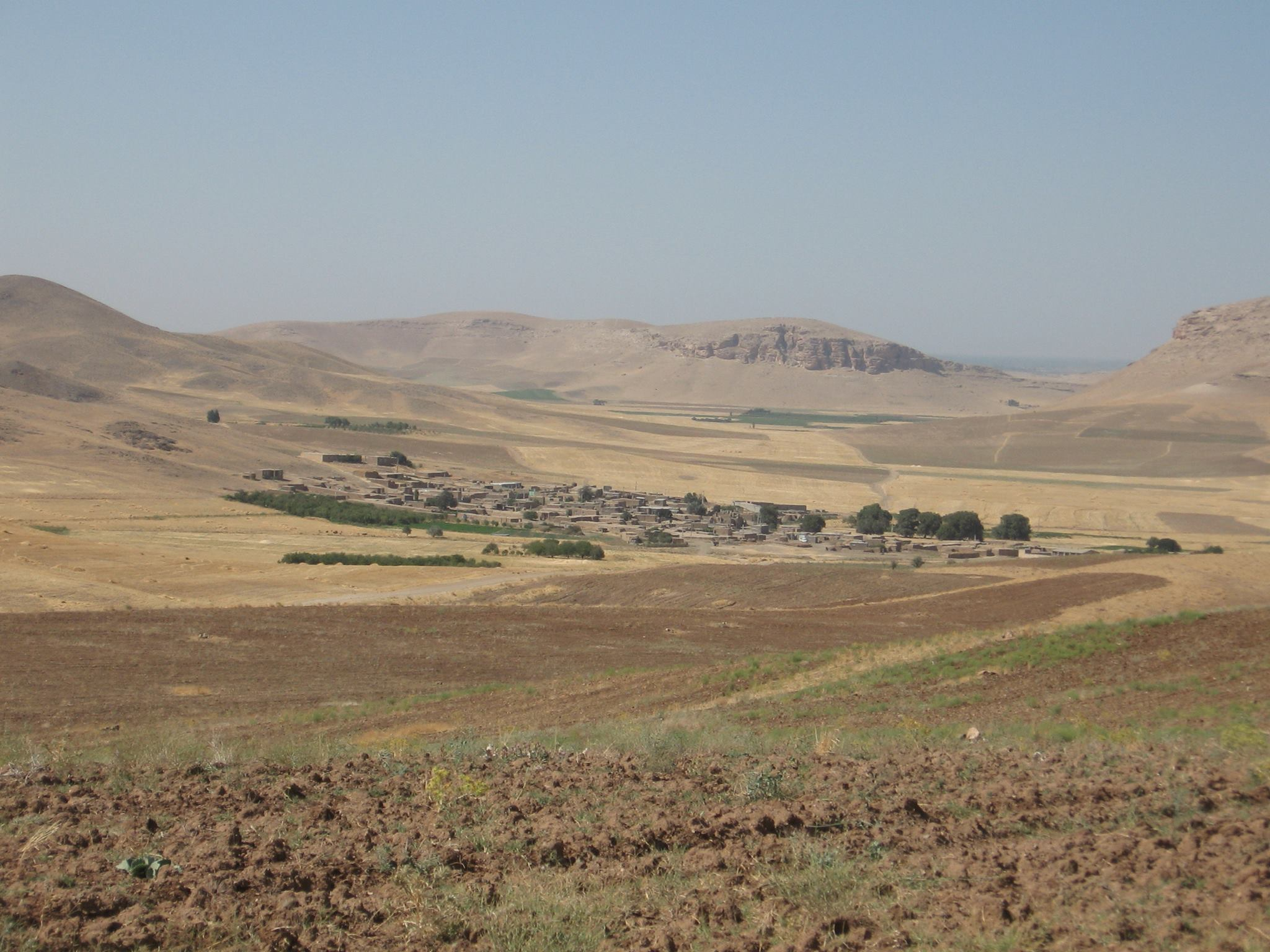

Pirvali Baghi (Persian: پيرولي باغي, also Romanized as Pīrvalī Bāghī) is a village in Akhtachi-ye Mahali Rural District, Simmineh District, Bukan County, West Azerbaijan Province, Iran. At the 2006 census, its population was 300, in 56 families.
