= Rubahqan =

Rubahqan روبهقان
- Village
- Location within Iran
- Coordinates: 29°37′26″N 53°09′19″E
- Country: Iran
- Province: Fars
- County: Kharameh
- Bakhsh: Central
- Rural District: Dehqanan

Population (2006)
  - Total: 714
- Time zone: UTC+3:30 (IRST)
  - Summer (DST): UTC+4:30 (IRDT)

Rubahqan (Persian: روبهقان, also Romanized as Rūbahqān and Rūbehqān; also known as Roobahghan) is a village in Dehqanan Rural District, in the Central District of Kharameh County, Fars province, Iran. During the 2006 census, its population was 714, in 168 families.
