= Ali Kand =

Ali Kand آلي كند
- Village
- Location within Iran
- Coordinates: 36°38′45″N 46°06′54″E
- Country: Iran
- Province: West Azerbaijan
- County: Bukan
- Bakhsh: Simmineh
- Rural District: Akhtachi-ye Sharqi

Population (2006)
  - Total: 139
- Time zone: UTC+3:30 (IRST)
  - Summer (DST): UTC+4:30 (IRDT)

Ali Kand (Persian: آلي كند, also Romanized as ‘Alī Kand) is a village in Akhtachi-ye Sharqi Rural District, Simmineh District, Bukan County, West Azerbaijan Province, Iran. At the 2006 census, its population was 139, in 27 families.
