= Owrta Kand =

Owrta Kand or Urta Kand or Urtakand (Persian: اورتاكند) may refer to:

- Owrta Kand, East Azerbaijan
- Urtakand, Razavi Khorasan
- Urta Kand, Bukan, West Azerbaijan Province
- Urtakand, Chaldoran, West Azerbaijan Province
