= Abshur, Fars =

Village in Fars province, Iran

Abshur Persian: ابشور
- Village
- Location within Iran
- Coordinates: 29°32′48″N 53°04′52″E
- Country: Iran
- Province: Fars
- County: Kharameh
- District: Central
- Rural District: Kheyrabad

Population (2016)
  - Total: 1,485
- Time zone: UTC+3:30 (IRST)

Abshur (Persian: ابشور) (Note: Also romanized as Ābshūr) is a village in, and the capital of, Kheyrabad Rural District of the Central District of Kharameh County, Fars province, Iran. The rural district was previously administered from the city of Kheyrabad-e Tulalli.

== Demographics ==
=== Population ===
At the time of the 2006 National Census, the village's population was 1,169 in 272 households, when it was in Korbal District of Shiraz County. The following census in 2011 counted 1,396 people in 374 households, by which time the district had been separated from the county in the establishment of Kharameh County. The rural district was transferred to the new Central District. The 2016 census measured the population of the village as 1,485 people in 419 households.
