= Kuh kiyare =

Kuh kiyare Persian: کوه خیاره
- Village
- Country: Iran
- Province: Fars
- County: Kharameh
- District: Central
- Rural District: Moezzabad

Population (2016)
  - Total: 1,680
- Time zone: UTC+3:30 (IRST)

Kuh kiyare (Persian: کوه خیاره) is a village in, and the capital of, Moezzabad Rural District of the Central District of Kharameh County, Fars province, Iran.
