= Kani Allah Seyedeh =

Kani Allah Seyedeh كاني اله سيده
- Village
- Location within Iran
- Coordinates: 36°36′39″N 46°27′33″E
- Country: Iran
- Province: West Azerbaijan
- County: Bukan
- Bakhsh: Simmineh
- Rural District: Behi Dehbokri

Population (2006)
  - Total: 97
- Time zone: UTC+3:30 (IRST)
  - Summer (DST): UTC+4:30 (IRDT)

Kani Allah Seyedeh (Persian: كاني اله سيده, also Romanized as Kānī Allāh Seyedeh) is a village in Behi Dehbokri Rural District, Simmineh District, Bukan County, West Azerbaijan Province, Iran. At the 2006 census, its population was 97, in 19 families.
