= Nosrat =

Nosrat نصرت
- Village
- Location within Iran
- Coordinates: 29°38′28″N 53°06′10″E
- Country: Iran
- Province: Fars
- County: Kharameh
- Bakhsh: Central
- Rural District: Dehqanan

Population (2006)
  - Total: 141
- Time zone: UTC+3:30 (IRST)
  - Summer (DST): UTC+4:30 (IRDT)

Nosrat (Persian: نصرت, also Romanized as Noşrat) is a village in Dehqanan Rural District, in the Central District of Kharameh County, Fars province, Iran. At the 2006 census, its population was 141, in 34 families.
