= Tang Qir =

Tang Qir تنگ قير
- Village
- Location within Iran
- Coordinates: 29°32′17″N 53°03′47″E
- Country: Iran
- Province: Fars
- County: Kharameh
- Bakhsh: Central
- Rural District: Kheyrabad

Population (2006)
  - Total: 195
- Time zone: UTC+3:30 (IRST)
  - Summer (DST): UTC+4:30 (IRDT)

Tang Qir (Persian: تنگ قير, also Romanized as Tang Qīr) is a village in Kheyrabad Rural District, in the Central District of Kharameh County, Fars province, Iran. At the 2006 census, its population was 195, in 53 families.
