= Kani Guzlah =

Kani Guzlah كاني گوزله
- Village
- Location within Iran
- Coordinates: 36°49′36″N 46°19′37″E
- Country: Iran
- Province: West Azerbaijan
- County: Bukan
- Bakhsh: Simmineh
- Rural District: Akhtachi-ye Mahali

Population (2006)
  - Total: 111
- Time zone: UTC+3:30 (IRST)
  - Summer (DST): UTC+4:30 (IRDT)

Kani Guzlah (Persian: كاني گوزله, also Romanized as Kānī Gūzlah; also known as Kānī Kūzlah) is a village in Akhtachi-ye Mahali Rural District, Simmineh District, Bukan County, West Azerbaijan Province, Iran. At the 2006 census, its population was 111, in 22 families.
