= Qaleh Mahmudi =

Qaleh Mahmudi قلعه محمودي
- Village
- Location within Iran
- Coordinates: 29°33′40″N 53°25′41″E
- Country: Iran
- Province: Fars
- County: Kharameh
- Bakhsh: Central
- Rural District: Sofla

Population (2006)
  - Total: 54
- Time zone: UTC+3:30 (IRST)
  - Summer (DST): UTC+4:30 (IRDT)

Qaleh Mahmudi (Persian: قلعه محمودي, also Romanized as Qal‘eh Maḩmūdī) is a village in Sofla Rural District, in the Central District of Kharameh County, Fars province, Iran. At the 2006 census, its population was 54, in 15 families.
