= Gavmishan =

Gavmishan (Persian: گاوميشان) may refer to:

- Gavmishan, Fars
- Gavmishan, Bukan, West Azerbaijan Province
- Gavmishan, Mahabad, West Azerbaijan Province
