= Gol Marzanik =

Gol Marzanik گل مرزنيك
- Village
- Location within Iran
- Coordinates: 36°43′43″N 46°08′13″E
- Country: Iran
- Province: West Azerbaijan
- County: Bukan
- Bakhsh: Simmineh
- Rural District: Akhtachi-ye Mahali

Population (2006)
  - Total: 434
- Time zone: UTC+3:30 (IRST)
  - Summer (DST): UTC+4:30 (IRDT)

Gol Marzanik (Persian: گل مرزنيك, also Romanized as Gol Marzanīk; also known as Gol Marzīnak) is a village in Akhtachi-ye Mahali Rural District, Simmineh District, Bukan County, West Azerbaijan Province, Iran. At the 2006 census, its population was 434, in 79 families.
