= Cheshmeh-ye Valiabad Vali =

Cheshmeh-ye Valiabad Vali چشمه ولي ابادوالي
- Village
- Country: Iran
- Province: Fars
- County: Kharameh
- Bakhsh: Central
- Rural District: Korbal

Population (2006)
  - Total: 296
- Time zone: UTC+3:30 (IRST)
  - Summer (DST): UTC+4:30 (IRDT)

Cheshmeh-ye Valiabad Vali (Persian: چشمه ولي ابادوالي, also Romanized as Cheshmeh-ye Valīābād Vālī) is a village in Korbal Rural District, in the Central District of Kharameh County, Fars province, Iran. At the 2006 census, its population was 296, in 67 families.
