= Ashkutan =

Ashkutan اشكوتان
- Village
- Location within Iran
- Coordinates: 36°40′43″N 46°13′29″E
- Country: Iran
- Province: West Azerbaijan
- County: Bukan
- Bakhsh: Simmineh
- Rural District: Akhtachi-ye Sharqi

Population (2006)
  - Total: 170
- Time zone: UTC+3:30 (IRST)
  - Summer (DST): UTC+4:30 (IRDT)

Ashkutan (Persian: اشكوتان, also Romanized as Ashkūtān) is a village in Akhtachi-ye Sharqi Rural District, Simmineh District, Bukan County, West Azerbaijan Province, Iran. At the 2006 census, its population was 170, in 37 families.
