= Bast-e Kheyrabad =

Bast-e Kheyrabad بست خيراباد
- Village
- Location within Iran
- Coordinates: 29°32′28″N 53°02′59″E
- Country: Iran
- Province: Fars
- County: Kharameh
- Bakhsh: Central
- Rural District: Kheyrabad

Population (2006)
  - Total: 319
- Time zone: UTC+3:30 (IRST)
  - Summer (DST): UTC+4:30 (IRDT)

Bast-e Kheyrabad (Persian: بست خيراباد, also Romanized as Bast-e Kheyrābād) is a village in Kheyrabad Rural District, in the Central District of Kharameh County, Fars province, Iran. At the 2006 census, its population was 319, in 85 families.
