= Saqqaabad =

Saqqaabad سقااباد
- Village
- Location within Iran
- Coordinates: 29°38′19″N 53°08′20″E
- Country: Iran
- Province: Fars
- County: Kharameh
- Bakhsh: Central
- Rural District: Dehqanan

Population (2006)
  - Total: 283
- Time zone: UTC+3:30 (IRST)
  - Summer (DST): UTC+4:30 (IRDT)

Saqqaabad (Persian: سقااباد, also Romanized as Saqqāābād and Saqāābād; also known as Saghgha Abad) is a village in Dehqanan Rural District, in the Central District of Kharameh County, Fars province, Iran. At the 2006 census, its population was 283, in 69 families.
