= Ahmadabad-e Korbal =

Ahmadabad-e Korbal احمدابادكربال
- Village
- Location within Iran
- Coordinates: 29°26′52″N 53°08′48″E
- Country: Iran
- Province: Fars
- County: Kharameh
- Bakhsh: Central
- Rural District: Kheyrabad

Population (2006)
  - Total: 576
- Time zone: UTC+3:30 (IRST)
  - Summer (DST): UTC+4:30 (IRDT)

Ahmadabad-e Korbal (Persian: احمدابادكربال, also Romanized as Aḩmadābād-e Korbāl; also known as Aḩmadābād) is a village in Kheyrabad Rural District, in the Central District of Kharameh County, Fars province, Iran. At the 2006 census, its population was 576, in 136 families.
