= Kohneh Mollalar =

Kohneh Mollalar كهنه ملالر
- Village
- Location within Iran
- Coordinates: 36°42′24″N 46°04′35″E
- Country: Iran
- Province: West Azerbaijan
- County: Bukan
- Bakhsh: Simmineh
- Rural District: Akhtachi-ye Sharqi

Population (2006)
  - Total: 67
- Time zone: UTC+3:30 (IRST)
  - Summer (DST): UTC+4:30 (IRDT)

Kohneh Mollalar (Persian: كهنه ملالر, also Romanized as Kohneh Mollālar) is a village in Akhtachi-ye Sharqi Rural District, Simmineh District, Bukan County, West Azerbaijan Province, Iran. At the 2006 census, its population was 67, in 13 families.
