= Qavamabad =

Qavamabad or Qavvamabad or Qawwamabad or Quvvamabad (Persian: قوام اباد) may refer to:

- Qavamabad, Kharameh, Fars Province
- Qavamabad, Pasargad, Fars Province
- Qavamabad-e Chichaklu, Fars Province
- Qavamabad, Isfahan
- Qavamabad, Kerman
- Qavamabad, Rafsanjan, Kerman Province
- Qavamabad, Yazd
