= Dashaghol =

Dashaghol داشاغل
- Village
- Location within Iran
- Coordinates: 36°32′04″N 46°22′42″E
- Country: Iran
- Province: West Azerbaijan
- County: Bukan
- Bakhsh: Simmineh
- Rural District: Behi Dehbokri

Population (2006)
  - Total: 230
- Time zone: UTC+3:30 (IRST)
  - Summer (DST): UTC+4:30 (IRDT)

Dashaghol (Persian: داشاغل, also Romanized as Dāshāghol and Dāsh Āghol) is a village in Behi Dehbokri Rural District, Simmineh District, Bukan County, West Azerbaijan Province, Iran. At the 2006 census, its population was 230, in 48 families.
