= Aspugheh =

Aspugheh اسپوغه
- Village
- Location within Iran
- Coordinates: 36°39′37″N 46°07′55″E
- Country: Iran
- Province: West Azerbaijan
- County: Bukan
- Bakhsh: Simmineh
- Rural District: Akhtachi-ye Sharqi

Population (2006)
  - Total: 166
- Time zone: UTC+3:30 (IRST)
  - Summer (DST): UTC+4:30 (IRDT)

Aspugheh (Persian: اسپوغه, also Romanized as Aspūgheh) is a village in Akhtachi-ye Sharqi Rural District, Simmineh District, Bukan County, West Azerbaijan Province, Iran. At the 2006 census, its population was 166, in 28 families.
