= Qurmish =

Qurmish قورميش
- Village
- Location within Iran
- Coordinates: 36°38′45″N 46°16′44″E
- Country: Iran
- Province: West Azerbaijan
- County: Bukan
- Bakhsh: Simmineh
- Rural District: Behi Dehbokri

Population (2006)
  - Total: 178
- Time zone: UTC+3:30 (IRST)
  - Summer (DST): UTC+4:30 (IRDT)

Qurmish (Persian: قورميش, also Romanized as Qūrmīsh and Qowrmīsh; also known as Gharmish, Kurmish, and Qormīsh) is a village in Behi Dehbokri Rural District, Simmineh District, Bukan County, West Azerbaijan Province, Iran. At the 2006 census, its population was 178, in 35 families.
