= Kani Shaqaqan =

Kani Shaqaqan كاني شقاقان
- Village
- Location within Iran
- Coordinates: 36°39′35″N 46°13′04″E
- Country: Iran
- Province: West Azerbaijan
- County: Bukan
- Bakhsh: Simmineh
- Rural District: Akhtachi-ye Sharqi

Population (2006)
  - Total: 93
- Time zone: UTC+3:30 (IRST)
  - Summer (DST): UTC+4:30 (IRDT)

Kani Shaqaqan (Persian: كاني شقاقان, also Romanized as Kānī Shaqāqān) is a village in Akhtachi-ye Sharqi Rural District, Simmineh District, Bukan County, West Azerbaijan Province, Iran. At the 2006 census, its population was 93, in 19 families.
