= Cheshmeh-ye Ab Gorazi =

Cheshmeh-ye Ab Gorazi چشمه اب گرازي
- Village
- Location within Iran
- Coordinates: 29°22′24″N 53°17′00″E
- Country: Iran
- Province: Fars
- County: Kharameh
- Bakhsh: Central
- Rural District: Korbal

Population (2006)
  - Total: 106
- Time zone: UTC+3:30 (IRST)
  - Summer (DST): UTC+4:30 (IRDT)

Cheshmeh-ye Ab Gorazi (Persian: چشمه اب گرازي, also Romanized as Cheshmeh-ye Āb Gorāzī) is a village in Korbal Rural District, in the Central District of Kharameh County, Fars province, Iran. At the 2006 census, its population was 106, in 18 families.
