= Sari Qamish =

Sari Qamish or Sari Qomish (Persian: ساري قميش) may refer to:

- Sari Qamish, East Azerbaijan
- Sari Qomish, Meyaneh, East Azerbaijan Province
- Sari Qamish, Golestan
- Sari Qamish, Hamadan
- Sari Qomish, West Azerbaijan
- Sari Qomish-e Qeshlaq, West Azerbaijan Province
