= Kafdehak =

Village in Fars province, Iran

Kafdehak Persian: كفدهك
- Village
- Location within Iran
- Coordinates: 29°30′36″N 53°15′01″E
- Country: Iran
- Province: Fars
- County: Kharameh
- District: Central
- Rural District: Kafdehak

Population (2016)
  - Total: 1,556
- Time zone: UTC+3:30 (IRST)

Kafdehak (Persian: كفدهك) (Note: Also known as Kandhak) is a village in, and the capital of, Kafdehak Rural District (Note: Formerly Korbal Rural District) of the Central District of Kharameh County, Fars province, Iran.

== Demographics ==
=== Population ===
At the time of the 2006 National Census, the village's population was 1,520 in 356 households, when it was in Korbal Rural District of Korbal District, Shiraz County. The following census in 2011 counted 1,760 people in 471 households, by which time the district had been separated from the county in the establishment of Kharameh County. The rural district was transferred to the new Central District and renamed Kafdehak Rural District. The 2016 census measured the population of the village as 1,556 people in 476 households. It was the most populous village in its rural district.
