= Mehrabad, Kharameh =

Mehrabad مهراباد
- Village
- Location within Iran
- Coordinates: 29°25′28″N 53°14′02″E
- Country: Iran
- Province: Fars
- County: Kherameh
- Bakhsh: Central
- Rural District: Korbal

Population (2006)
  - Total: 576
- Time zone: UTC+3:30 (IRST)
  - Summer (DST): UTC+4:30 (IRDT)

Mehrabad (Persian: مهراباد, also Romanized as Mehrābād; also known as Mehrābād-e Bālā) is a village in Korbal Rural District, in the Central District of Kherameh County, Fars province, Iran. At the 2006 census, its population was 576, in 122 families.

== See also ==
- List of cities, towns and villages in Fars province
