= Qular =

Qular (Persian: قولار or قولر) may refer to:

- Qular, Bukan (قولر - Qūlar)
- Qular, Chaldoran (قولار - Qūlār)
