= Esmailabad-e Pain =

Esmailabad-e Pain اسمعيل ابادپائين
- Village
- Location within Iran
- Coordinates: 29°35′38″N 53°17′18″E
- Country: Iran
- Province: Fars
- County: Kharameh
- Bakhsh: Central
- Rural District: Sofla

Population (2006)
  - Total: 278
- Time zone: UTC+3:30 (IRST)
  - Summer (DST): UTC+4:30 (IRDT)

Esmailabad-e Pain (Persian: اسمعيل ابادپائين, also Romanized as Esmā‘īlābād-e Pā’īn; also known as Esma‘īlābād, Esmā’īlābād, Esmā‘īlābād-e Korbāl, and Esma‘īlābād Korbal) is a village in Sofla Rural District, in the Central District of Kharameh County, Fars province, Iran. At the 2006 census, its population was 278, in 60 families.
