= Hajjiabad-e Akhtachi =

Village in West Azerbaijan province, Iran

Hajjiabad-e Akhtachi Persian: حاجي اباداختاچي
- Village
- Location within Iran
- Coordinates: 36°48′28″N 46°07′30″E
- Country: Iran
- Province: West Azerbaijan
- County: Bukan
- District: Simmineh
- Rural District: Akhtachi-ye Mahali

Population (2016)
  - Total: 952
- Time zone: UTC+3:30 (IRST)

Hajjiabad-e Akhtachi (Persian: حاجي اباداختاچي) (Note: Also romanized as Hajjiabad-e Okhtachi and Ḩājjīābād-e Okhtāchī) is a village in Akhtachi-ye Mahali Rural District of Simmineh District in Bukan County, West Azerbaijan province, Iran.

== Demographics ==
=== Population ===
At the time of the 2006 National Census, the village's population was 934 in 191 households. The following census in 2011 counted 1,009 people in 231 households. The 2016 census measured the population of the village as 952 people in 322 households.
