= Qazi Akhavi =

Village in West Azerbaijan province, Iran

Qazi Akhavi Persian: قاضي اخوي
- Village
- Location within Iran
- Coordinates: 36°39′04″N 46°24′47″E
- Country: Iran
- Province: West Azerbaijan
- County: Bukan
- District: Simmineh
- Rural District: Behi Dehbokri

Population (2016)
  - Total: 210
- Time zone: UTC+3:30 (IRST)

Qazi Akhavi (Persian: قاضي اخوي) (Note: Also romanized as Qāẕī Akhavī) is a village in Behi Dehbokri Rural District of Simmineh District in Bukan County, West Azerbaijan province, Iran.

== Demographics ==
=== Population ===
At the time of the 2006 National Census, the village's population was 234 in 50 households. The following census in 2011 counted 228 people in 58 households. The 2016 census measured the population of the village as 210 people in 70 households.
