= Sofla, Kharameh =

Village in Fars province, Iran

Sofla Persian: سفلي
- Village
- Location within Iran
- Coordinates: 29°35′32″N 53°20′07″E
- Country: Iran
- Province: Fars
- County: Kharameh
- District: Korbal
- Rural District: Sofla

Population (2016)
  - Total: 888
- Time zone: UTC+3:30 (IRST)

Sofla (Persian: سفلي) (Note: Also romanized as Soflá; also known as Seyfollāh and Sufla) is a village in, and the capital of, Sofla Rural District of Korbal District, Kharameh County, Fars province, Iran.

== Demographics ==
=== Population ===
At the time of the 2006 National Census, the village's population was 1,089 in 241 households, when it was in Shiraz County. The following census in 2011 counted 1,052 people in 319 households, by which time the district had been separated from the county in the establishment of Kharameh County. The 2016 census measured the population of the village as 888 people in 278 households. It was the most populous village in its rural district.
