= Qarah Gol, Bukan =

Village in West Azerbaijan province, Iran

Qarah Gol Persian: قره گل
- Village
- Location within Iran
- Coordinates: 36°51′19″N 46°05′15″E
- Country: Iran
- Province: West Azerbaijan
- County: Bukan
- District: Simmineh
- Rural District: Akhtachi-ye Mahali

Population (2016)
  - Total: 568
- Time zone: UTC+3:30 (IRST)

Qarah Gol (Persian: قره گل) (Note: Also romanized as Qareh Gol) is a village in Akhtachi-ye Mahali Rural District of Simmineh District in Bukan County, West Azerbaijan province, Iran.

== Demographics ==
=== Population ===
At the time of the 2006 National Census, the village's population was 532 in 91 households. The following census in 2011 counted 538 people in 122 households. The 2016 census measured the population of the village as 568 people in 182 households.
