= Qarah Qayah, Fars =

Qarah Qayah قره قيه
- Village
- Location within Iran
- Coordinates: 29°26′21″N 53°31′18″E
- Country: Iran
- Province: Fars
- County: Kharameh
- Bakhsh: Central
- Rural District: Korbal

Population (2006)
  - Total: 108
- Time zone: UTC+3:30 (IRST)
  - Summer (DST): UTC+4:30 (IRDT)

Qarah Qayah (Persian: قره قيه) is a village in Korbal Rural District, in the Central District of Kharameh County, Fars province, Iran. At the 2006 census, its population was 108, in 20 families.
