= Darniyan =

Darniyan or Darnian (Persian: درنيان) may refer to:

- Darnian, Fars
- Darniyan, Hamadan
- Darniyan, Kerman

== See also ==
- Darinan (disambiguation)
