= Gerd Qebran =

Village in West Azerbaijan province, Iran

Gerd Qebran Persian: گردقبران
- Village
- Location within Iran
- Coordinates: 36°37′22″N 46°10′00″E
- Country: Iran
- Province: West Azerbaijan
- County: Bukan
- District: Simmineh
- Rural District: Akhtachi-ye Sharqi

Population (2016)
  - Total: 637
- Time zone: UTC+3:30 (IRST)

Gerd Qebran (Persian: گردقبران) (Note: Also romanized as Gerd Qebrān; also known as Anbār-e ‘Olyā, Gerū Qebrān, and Kord Qebrān) is a village in Akhtachi-ye Sharqi Rural District of Simmineh District in Bukan County, West Azerbaijan province, Iran.

== Demographics ==
=== Population ===
At the time of the 2006 National Census, the village's population was 631 in 102 households. The following census in 2011 counted 577 people in 126 households. The 2016 census measured the population of the village as 637 people in 193 households.
