= Kulabad =

Kulabad (Persian: كول اباد or کول آباد) may refer to:

- Kulabad, Lorestan
- Kulabad, Razavi Khorasan
- Kulabad, West Azerbaijan
