= Kulabad, West Azerbaijan =

Kulabad كول اباد
- Village
- Location within Iran
- Coordinates: 36°46′20″N 46°09′04″E
- Country: Iran
- Province: West Azerbaijan
- County: Bukan
- Bakhsh: Simmineh
- Rural District: Akhtachi-ye Mahali

Population (2006)
  - Total: 149
- Time zone: UTC+3:30 (IRST)
  - Summer (DST): UTC+4:30 (IRDT)

Kulabad (Persian: كول اباد, also Romanized as Kūlābād) is a village in Akhtachi-ye Mahali Rural District, Simmineh District, Bukan County, West Azerbaijan Province, Iran. At the 2006 census, its population was 149, in 27 families.
