= Javanmard =

Village in West Azerbaijan province, Iran

Javanmard Persian: جوانمرد
- Village
- Location within Iran
- Coordinates: 36°35′55″N 46°24′59″E
- Country: Iran
- Province: West Azerbaijan
- County: Bukan
- District: Simmineh
- Rural District: Behi Dehbokri

Population (2016)
  - Total: 646
- Time zone: UTC+3:30 (IRST)

Javanmard (Persian: جوانمرد) (Note: Also romanized as Javānmard) is a village in, and the capital of, Behi Dehbokri Rural District in Simmineh District of Bukan County, West Azerbaijan province, Iran.

== Demographics ==
=== Population ===
At the time of the 2006 National Census, the village's population was 787 in 153 households. The following census in 2011 counted 677 people in 166 households. The 2016 census measured the population of the village as 646 people in 204 households. It was the most populous village in its rural district.
