= Gol Tappeh-ye Qurmish =

Village in West Azerbaijan province, Iran

Gol Tappeh-ye Qurmish Persian: گل تپه قورميش
- Village
- Location within Iran
- Coordinates: 36°37′45″N 46°20′02″E
- Country: Iran
- Province: West Azerbaijan
- County: Bukan
- District: Simmineh
- Rural District: Behi Dehbokri

Population (2016)
  - Total: 394
- Time zone: UTC+3:30 (IRST)

Gol Tappeh-ye Qurmish (Persian: گل تپه قورميش) (Note: Also romanized as Gol Tappeh-ye Qūrmīsh; also known as Kal-e Tappeh Qūrmīsh) is a village in Behi Dehbokri Rural District of Simmineh District in Bukan County, West Azerbaijan province, Iran.

== Demographics ==
=== Population ===
At the time of the 2006 National Census, the village's population was 330 in 61 households. The following census in 2011 counted 444 people in 103 households. The 2016 census measured the population of the village as 394 people in 113 households.
