= Qular, Bukan =

Qular قولر
- Village
- Location within Iran
- Coordinates: 36°42′28″N 46°17′10″E
- Country: Iran
- Province: West Azerbaijan
- County: Bukan
- Bakhsh: Simmineh
- Rural District: Behi Dehbokri

Population (2006)
  - Total: 122
- Time zone: UTC+3:30 (IRST)
  - Summer (DST): UTC+4:30 (IRDT)

Qular (Persian: قولر, also Romanized as Qūlar; also known as Qūyler) is a village in Behi Dehbokri Rural District, Simmineh District, Bukan County, West Azerbaijan Province, Iran. At the 2006 census, its population was 122 people, totaling 23 families.
