= Moezzabad =

Moezzabad or Moez Abad (Persian: معزاباد) may refer to:

- Moezzabad-e Gurgir
- Moezzabad-e Jaberi, a city in Kharameh County, Fars province
- Moezzabad Rural District, an administrative division of Kharameh County, Fars province
