= Aghjivan =

Village in West Azerbaijan province, Iran

Aghjivan Persian: اغجيوان
- Village
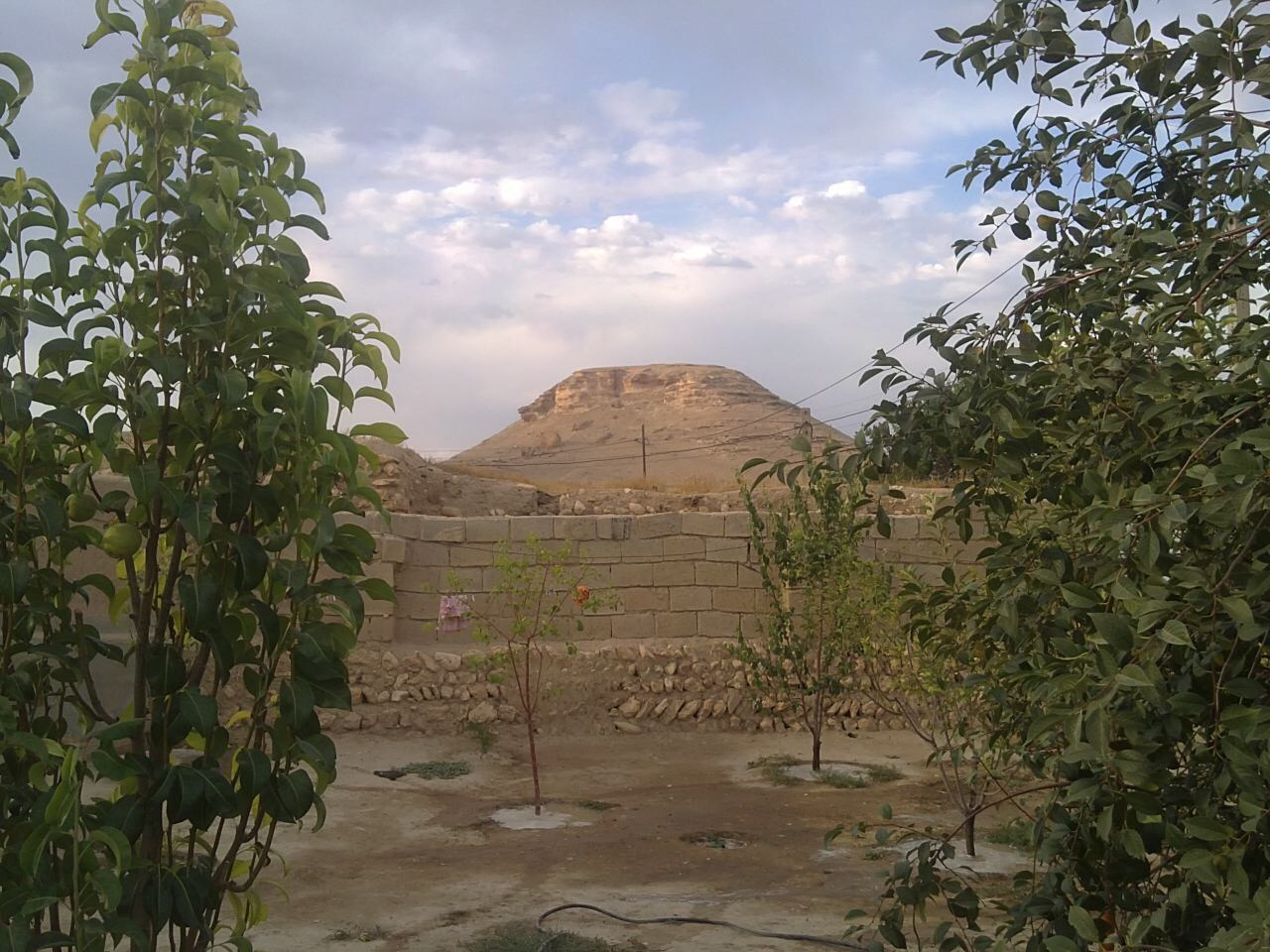

- Location within Iran
- Coordinates: 36°42′41″N 46°23′17″E
- Country: Iran
- Province: West Azerbaijan
- County: Bukan
- District: Simmineh
- Rural District: Behi Dehbokri

Population (2016)
  - Total: 616
- Time zone: UTC+3:30 (IRST)

Aghjivan (Persian: اغجيوان) (Note: Also romanized as Āghjīvān; also known as Āghjavān and Āghjovān) is a village in Behi Dehbokri Rural District of Simmineh District in Bukan County, West Azerbaijan province, Iran.

== Demographics ==
=== Population ===
At the time of the 2006 National Census, the village's population was 661 in 124 households. The following census in 2011 counted 713 people in 182 households. The 2016 census measured the population of the village as 616 people in 191 households.
