= Qarenjeh-ye Kuchek =

Qarenjeh-ye Kuchek قارنجه كوچك
- Village
- Location within Iran
- Coordinates: 36°47′18″N 46°07′47″E
- Country: Iran
- Province: West Azerbaijan
- County: Bukan
- Bakhsh: Simmineh
- Rural District: Akhtachi-ye Mahali

Population (2006)
  - Total: 97
- Time zone: UTC+3:30 (IRST)
  - Summer (DST): UTC+4:30 (IRDT)

Qarenjeh-ye Kuchek (Persian: قارنجه كوچك, also Romanized as Qārenjeh-ye Kūchek) is a village in Akhtachi-ye Mahali Rural District, Simmineh District, Bukan County, West Azerbaijan Province, Iran. At the 2006 census, its population was 97, in 14 families.
