= Urta Kand, Bukan =

Urta Kand اورتاكند
- Village
- Location within Iran
- Coordinates: 36°35′07″N 46°27′06″E
- Country: Iran
- Province: West Azerbaijan
- County: Bukan
- Bakhsh: Simmineh
- Rural District: Behi Dehbokri

Population (2006)
  - Total: 79
- Time zone: UTC+3:30 (IRST)
  - Summer (DST): UTC+4:30 (IRDT)

Urta Kand (Persian: اورتاكند, also Romanized as Ūrtā Kand; also known as Ūrteh Kand) is a village in Behi Dehbokri Rural District, Simmineh District, Bukan County, West Azerbaijan Province, Iran. At the 2006 census, its population was 79, in 24 families.
