= Hajji Lak =

Village in West Azerbaijan province, Iran

Hajji Lak Persian: حاجي لك
- Village
- Location within Iran
- Coordinates: 36°49′47″N 46°07′24″E
- Country: Iran
- Province: West Azerbaijan
- County: Bukan
- District: Simmineh
- Rural District: Akhtachi-ye Mahali

Population (2016)
  - Total: 735
- Time zone: UTC+3:30 (IRST)

Hajji Lak (Persian: حاجي لك) (Note: Also romanized as Ḩājjī Lak) is a village in Akhtachi-ye Mahali Rural District of Simmineh District in Bukan County, West Azerbaijan province, Iran.

== Demographics ==
=== Population ===
At the time of the 2006 National Census, the village's population was 749 in 153 households. The following census in 2011 counted 737 people in 179 households. The 2016 census measured the population of the village as 735 people in 247 households.
