= Qarenjeh-ye Bozorg =

Village in West Azerbaijan, Iran

Qarenjeh-ye Bozorg قارنجه بزرگ
- Village
- Location within Iran
- Coordinates: 36°46′53″N 46°08′06″E
- Country: Iran
- Province: West Azerbaijan
- County: Bukan
- Bakhsh: Simmineh
- Rural District: Akhtachi-ye Mahali

Population (2006)
  - Total: 462
- Time zone: UTC+3:30 (IRST)
  - Summer (DST): UTC+4:30 (IRDT)

Qarenjeh-ye Bozorg (Persian: قارنجه بزرگ, also Romanized as Qārenjeh-ye Bozorg) is a village in Akhtachi-ye Mahali Rural District, Simmineh District, Bukan County, West Azerbaijan Province, Iran. At the 2006 census, its population was 462, in 99 families.
