= Shahrak-e Isar, Kharameh =

Shahrak-e Isar شهرك ايثار
- Village
- Location within Iran
- Coordinates: 29°32′22″N 53°10′27″E
- Country: Iran
- Province: Fars
- County: Kharameh
- Bakhsh: Central
- Rural District: Korbal

Population (2006)
  - Total: 1,800
- Time zone: UTC+3:30 (IRST)
  - Summer (DST): UTC+4:30 (IRDT)

Shahrak-e Isar (Persian: شهرك ايثار, also Romanized as Shahrak-e Īs̄ār) is a village in Korbal Rural District, in the Central District of Kharameh County, Fars province, Iran. At the 2006 census, its population was 1,800, in 420 families.
