= Dash Band =

Village in West Azerbaijan province, Iran

Dash Band Persian: داش‌بند
- Village
- Location within Iran
- Coordinates: 36°38′48″N 46°10′14″E
- Country: Iran
- Province: West Azerbaijan
- County: Bukan
- District: Simmineh
- Rural District: Akhtachi-ye Sharqi

Population (2016)
  - Total: 2,376
- Time zone: UTC+3:30 (IRST)

Dash Band (Persian: داش‌بند) (Note: Also romanized as Dāsh Band) is a village in, and the capital of, Akhtachi-ye Sharqi Rural District in Simmineh District of Bukan County, West Azerbaijan province, Iran.

== Demographics ==
=== Population ===
In the 2006 National Census, the village's population was 1,801 in 353 households. The following census in 2011 counted 1,975 people in 429 households. The 2016 census recorded the population of the village as 2,376 people in 656 households.
