= Salamatabad, Kharameh =

Salamatabad سلامتاباد
- Village
- Location within Iran
- Coordinates: 29°35′33″N 53°15′24″E
- Country: Iran
- Province: Fars
- County: Kharameh
- Bakhsh: Central
- Rural District: Sofla

Population (2006)
  - Total: 560
- Time zone: UTC+3:30 (IRST)
  - Summer (DST): UTC+4:30 (IRDT)

Salamatabad (Persian: سلامتاباد, also Romanized as Salāmatābād; also known as Salāmābād) is a village in Sofla Rural District, in the Central District of Kharameh County, Fars province, Iran. At the 2006 census, its population was 560, in 138 families.
