= Rashidabad, Kharameh =

Rashidabad رشيداباد
- Village
- Location within Iran
- Coordinates: 29°35′30″N 53°19′21″E
- Country: Iran
- Province: Fars
- County: Kharameh
- Bakhsh: Central
- Rural District: Sofla

Population (2006)
  - Total: 88
- Time zone: UTC+3:30 (IRST)
  - Summer (DST): UTC+4:30 (IRDT)

Rashidabad (Persian: رشيداباد, also Romanized as Rashīdābād) is a village in Sofla Rural District, in the Central District of Kharameh County, Fars province, Iran. At the 2006 census, its population was 88, in 21 families.
