= Manuchehri, Iran =

Manuchehri (Persian: منوچهري) may refer to:

- Manuchehri, Fars
- Manuchehri, West Azerbaijan
