= Hammamian =

Village in West Azerbaijan province, Iran

Hammamian Persian: حماميان
- Village
- Location within Iran
- Coordinates: 36°33′54″N 46°11′46″E
- Country: Iran
- Province: West Azerbaijan
- County: Bukan
- District: Simmineh
- Rural District: Akhtachi-ye Sharqi

Population (2016)
  - Total: 1,021
- Time zone: UTC+3:30 (IRST)

Hammamian (Persian: حماميان) (Note: Also romanized as Ḩamāmīān, Ḩamāmiyān, Ḩammāmīān, and Ḩammāmiyān; also known as Hammāliān and Hammiān) is a village in Akhtachi-ye Sharqi Rural District of Simmineh District in Bukan County, West Azerbaijan province, Iran.

== Demographics ==
=== Population ===
At the time of the 2006 National Census, the village's population was 836 in 160 households. The following census in 2011 counted 913 people in 226 households. The 2016 census measured the population of the village as 1,021 people in 308 households.
