= Emamzadeh Aqil, Fars =

Emamzadeh Aqil امامزاده عقيل
- Village
- Location within Iran
- Coordinates: 29°32′14″N 53°19′47″E
- Country: Iran
- Province: Fars
- County: Kharameh
- Bakhsh: Central
- Rural District: Korbal

Population (2006)
  - Total: 14
- Time zone: UTC+3:30 (IRST)
  - Summer (DST): UTC+4:30 (IRDT)

Emamzadeh Aqil (Persian: امامزاده عقيل, also Romanized as Emāmzādeh 'Aqīl) is a village in Korbal Rural District, in the Central District of Kharameh County, Fars province, Iran. At the 2006 census, its population was 14, in 14 families.
