= Gavmishan, Fars =

Gavmishan گاوميشان
- Village
- Location within Iran
- Coordinates: 29°33′36″N 53°25′33″E
- Country: Iran
- Province: Fars
- County: Kharameh
- Bakhsh: Central
- Rural District: Sofla

Population (2006)
  - Total: 174
- Time zone: UTC+3:30 (IRST)
  - Summer (DST): UTC+4:30 (IRDT)

Gavmishan (Persian: گاوميشان, also Romanized as Gāvmīshān; also known as Bīsheh-ye Doshākh-e Bālā, Gāvmīshī, and Qal‘eh-ye Gāvmīshān) is a village in Sofla Rural District, in the Central District of Kharameh County, Fars province, Iran. At the 2006 census, its population was 174, in 45 families.
