= Nachit =

Village in West Azerbaijan province, Iran

Nachit Persian: ناچيت
- Village
- Location within Iran
- Coordinates: 36°34′34″N 46°13′02″E
- Country: Iran
- Province: West Azerbaijan
- County: Bukan
- District: Simmineh
- Rural District: Akhtachi-ye Sharqi

Population (2016)
  - Total: 2,850
- Time zone: UTC+3:30 (IRST)

Nachit (Persian: ناچيت) (Note: Also romanized as Nāchīt; also known as Nichit) is a village in Akhtachi-ye Sharqi Rural District of Simmineh District in Bukan County, West Azerbaijan province, Iran.

== Demographics ==
=== Population ===
At the time of the 2006 National Census, the village's population was 1,552 in 269 households. The following census in 2011 counted 1,833 people in 468 households. The 2016 census measured the population of the village as 2,850 people in 827 households. It was the most populous village in its rural district.
