= Darnian, Fars =

Darnian درنيان
- Village
- Location within Iran
- Coordinates: 29°36′31″N 53°15′03″E
- Country: Iran
- Province: Fars
- County: Kharameh
- Bakhsh: Central
- Rural District: Sofla

Population (2006)
  - Total: 379
- Time zone: UTC+3:30 (IRST)
  - Summer (DST): UTC+4:30 (IRDT)

Darnian (Persian: درنيان, also Romanized as Darnīān and Darniyan; also known as Darnūn) is a village in Sofla Rural District, in the Central District of Kharameh County, Fars province, Iran. At the 2006 census, its population was 379, in 95 families.
