= Salamabad =

Salamabad may refer to:

- Aşağı Salamabad, Azerbaijan
- Yuxarı Salamabad, Azerbaijan
- Salamabad, India, a crossing point on the Line of Control between India and Pakistan
- Salamabad, Ardabil, Iran
- Salamabad, Fars, Iran
- Salamabad, West Azerbaijan, Iran
- Salamabad Union, Bangladesh
