= Torkasheh =

Village in West Azerbaijan province, Iran

Torkasheh Persian: تركاشه
- Village
- Location within Iran
- Coordinates: 36°32′38″N 46°28′26″E
- Country: Iran
- Province: West Azerbaijan
- County: Bukan
- District: Simmineh
- Rural District: Behi Dehbokri

Population (2016)
  - Total: 225
- Time zone: UTC+3:30 (IRST)

Torkasheh (Persian: تركاشه) (Note: Also romanized as Torkāsheh) is a village in Behi Dehbokri Rural District of Simmineh District in Bukan County, West Azerbaijan province, Iran.

== Demographics ==
=== Population ===
At the time of the 2006 National Census, the village's population was 295 in 64 households. The following census in 2011 counted 227 people in 53 households. The 2016 census measured the population of the village as 225 people in 78 households.
