= Shahababad, Fars =

Shahababad شهاب اباد
- Village
- Location within Iran
- Coordinates: 29°37′49″N 53°13′11″E
- Country: Iran
- Province: Fars
- County: Kharameh
- Bakhsh: Central
- Rural District: Dehqanan

Population (2006)
  - Total: 244
- Time zone: UTC+3:30 (IRST)
  - Summer (DST): UTC+4:30 (IRDT)

Shahababad (Persian: شهاب اباد, also Romanized as Shahābābād) is a village in Dehqanan Rural District, in the Central District of Kharameh County, Fars province, Iran. At the 2006 census, its population was 245, in 49 families.
