= Teghnit =

Teghnit (Persian: تغنيت) may refer to:

- Teghnit-e Olya
- Teghnit-e Vasat
