= Uch Tappeh, West Azerbaijan =

Village in West Azerbaijan province, Iran

Uch Tappeh Persian: اوچ تپه
- Village
- Location within Iran
- Coordinates: 36°36′03″N 46°12′46″E
- Country: Iran
- Province: West Azerbaijan
- County: Bukan
- District: Simmineh
- Rural District: Akhtachi-ye Sharqi

Population (2016)
  - Total: 2,297
- Time zone: UTC+3:30 (IRST)

Uch Tappeh (Persian: اوچ تپه) (Note: Also romanized as Ūch Tappeh) is a village in Akhtachi-ye Sharqi Rural District of Simmineh District in Bukan County, West Azerbaijan province, Iran.

== Demographics ==
=== Population ===
At the time of the 2006 National Census, the village's population was 1,716 in 328 households. The following census in 2011 counted 1,787 people in 446 households. The 2016 census measured the population of the village as 2,297 people in 702 households.
