= Qavamabad, Kharameh =

Qavamabad قوام اباد
- Village
- Location within Iran
- Coordinates: 29°34′49″N 53°20′17″E
- Country: Iran
- Province: Fars
- County: Kharameh
- Bakhsh: Central
- Rural District: Sofla

Population (2006)
  - Total: 878
- Time zone: UTC+3:30 (IRST)
  - Summer (DST): UTC+4:30 (IRDT)

Qavamabad (Persian: قوام اباد, also Romanized as Qavāmābād; also known as Ghawam Abad Korbal, Qavāmābād-e Korbāl, and Qavāmābād-e Pā’īn) is a village in Sofla Rural District, in the Central District of Kharameh County, Fars province, Iran. At the 2006 census, its population was 878, in 217 families.
