= Sarab-e Rahim Khan =

Village in West Azerbaijan province, Iran

Sarab-e Rahim Khan Persian: سراب رحيم خان
- Village
- Location within Iran
- Coordinates: 36°48′01″N 46°17′45″E
- Country: Iran
- Province: West Azerbaijan
- County: Bukan
- District: Simmineh
- Rural District: Akhtachi-ye Mahali

Population (2016)
  - Total: 704
- Time zone: UTC+3:30 (IRST)

Sarab-e Rahim Khan (Persian: سراب رحيم خان) (Note: Also romanized as Sarāb-e Raḩīm Khān; also known as Sarāb) is a village in Akhtachi-ye Mahali Rural District of Simmineh District in Bukan County, West Azerbaijan province, Iran.

== Demographics ==
=== Population ===
At the time of the 2006 National Census, the village's population was 728 in 139 households. The following census in 2011 counted 599 people in 137 households. The 2016 census measured the population of the village as 704 people in 220 households.
