= Bid Zard, Kharameh =

Bid Zard بيدزرد
- Village
- Location within Iran
- Coordinates: 29°27′19″N 53°03′21″E
- Country: Iran
- Province: Fars
- County: Kharameh
- Bakhsh: Central
- Rural District: Kheyrabad

Population (2006)
  - Total: 76
- Time zone: UTC+3:30 (IRST)
  - Summer (DST): UTC+4:30 (IRDT)

Bid Zard (Persian: بيدزرد, also Romanized as Bīd Zard) is a village in Kheyrabad Rural District, in the Central District of Kharameh County, Fars province, Iran. At the 2006 census, its population was 76, in 21 families.
