= Dehqanan =

Village in Fars province, Iran

Dehqanan Persian: دهقانان
- Village
- Location within Iran
- Coordinates: 29°36′41″N 53°09′40″E
- Country: Iran
- Province: Fars
- County: Kharameh
- District: Korbal
- Rural District: Dehqanan

Population (2016)
  - Total: 561
- Time zone: UTC+3:30 (IRST)

Dehqanan (Persian: دهقانان) (Note: Also romanized as Dehqānān; also known as Dehghanan) is a village in, and the capital of, Dehqanan Rural District of Korbal District, Kharameh County, Fars province, Iran.

== Demographics ==
=== Population ===
At the time of the 2006 National Census, the village's population was 723 in 181 households, when it was in Shiraz County. The following census in 2011 counted 745 people in 218 households, by which time the district had been separated from the county in the establishment of Kharameh County. The 2016 census measured the population of the village as 561 people in 170 households.
