= Qarenjeh =

Qarenjeh (Persian: قارنجه) may refer to:

- Qarenjeh-ye Bozorg
- Qarenjeh-ye Kuchek
