= Hoseyn Mameh =

Village in West Azerbaijan province, Iran

Hoseyn Mameh Persian: حسين مامه
- Village
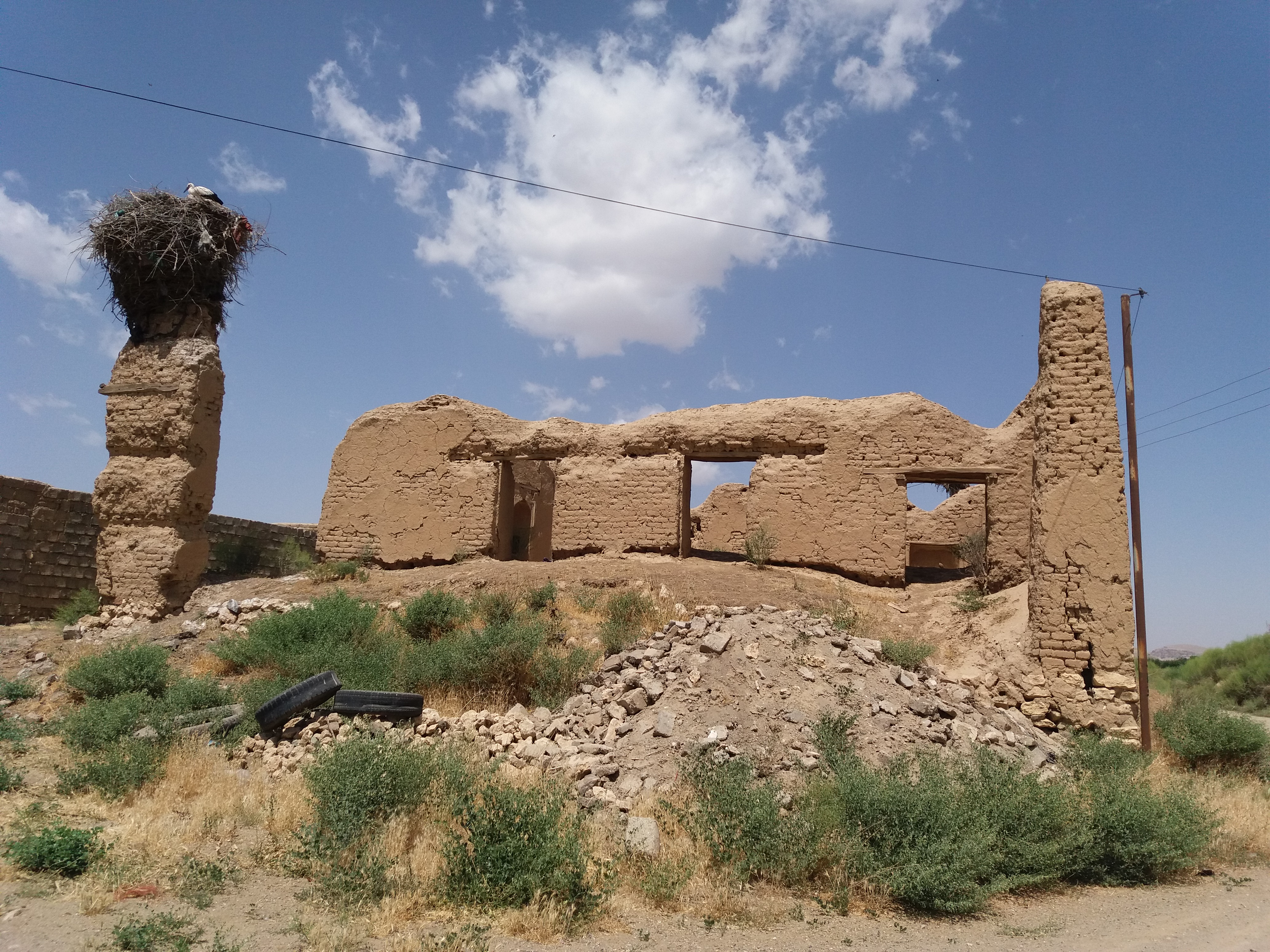

- Location within Iran
- Coordinates: 36°45′33″N 46°08′54″E
- Country: Iran
- Province: West Azerbaijan
- County: Bukan
- District: Simmineh
- Rural District: Akhtachi-ye Mahali

Population (2016)
  - Total: 625
- Time zone: UTC+3:30 (IRST)

Hoseyn Mameh (Persian: حسين مامه) (Note: Also romanized as Hoseyn Māmeh; also known as Ḩoseyn Māheh) is a village in Akhtachi-ye Mahali Rural District of Simmineh District in Bukan County, West Azerbaijan province, Iran.

== Demographics ==
=== Population ===
At the time of the 2006 National Census, the village's population was 702 in 130 households. The following census in 2011 counted 649 people in 147 households. The 2016 census measured the population of the village as 625 people in 193 households.
