= Emamzadeh Aqil =

Emamzadeh Aqil (Persian: امامزاده عقيل) may refer to:

- Emamzadeh Aqil, Fars
- Emamzadeh Aqil, Tehran
