= Sari Qomish, West Azerbaijan =

Village in West Azerbaijan province, Iran

Sari Qomish Persian: ساري قميش
- Village
- Location within Iran
- Coordinates: 36°50′30″N 46°07′49″E
- Country: Iran
- Province: West Azerbaijan
- County: Bukan
- District: Simmineh
- Rural District: Akhtachi-ye Mahali

Population (2016)
  - Total: 1,152
- Time zone: UTC+3:30 (IRST)

Sari Qomish (Persian: ساري قميش) (Note: Also romanized as Sārī Qomīsh) is a village in Akhtachi-ye Mahali Rural District of Simmineh District in Bukan County, West Azerbaijan province, Iran.

== Demographics ==
=== Population ===
At the time of the 2006 National Census, the village's population was 943 in 184 households. The following census in 2011 counted 1,043 people in 247 households. The 2016 census measured the population of the village as 1,152 people in 347 households.
