= Esmailabad-e Korbal =

Esmailabad-e Korbal or Esmailabad Korbal (Persian: اسمعيل ابادكربال) may refer to:

- Esmailabad-e Korbal, Jahrom
- Esmailabad-e Korbal, Kharameh
