= Kharameh =

City in Fars province, Iran

Kharameh Persian: خرامه
- City
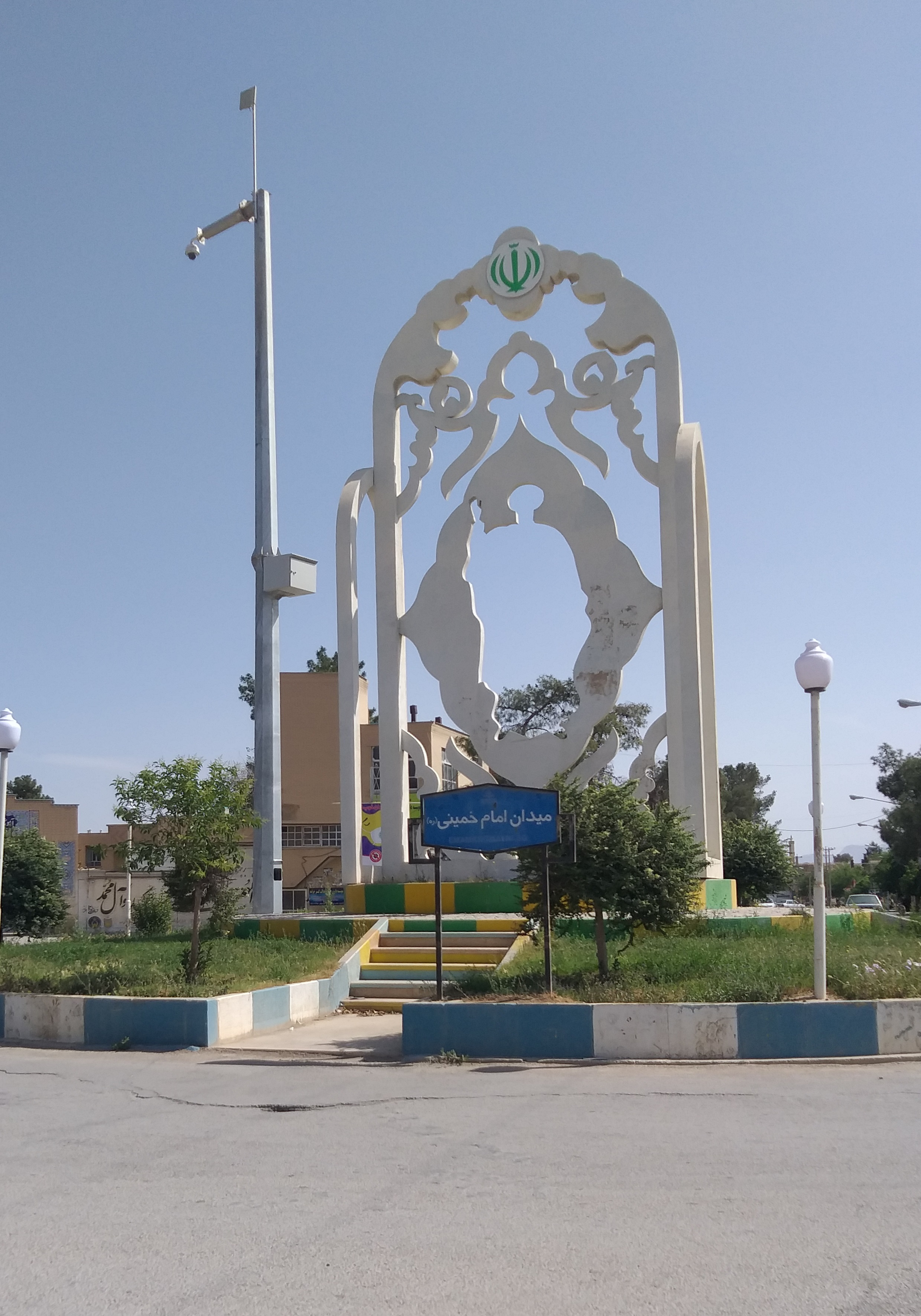

- Location within Iran
- Coordinates: 29°29′57″N 53°18′47″E
- Country: Iran
- Province: Fars
- County: Kharameh
- District: Central

Population (2016)
  - Total: 18,477
- Time zone: UTC+3:30 (IRST)

Kharameh (Persian: خرامه) (Note: Also romanized as Kherāmeh) is a city in the Central District of Kharameh County, Fars province, Iran, serving as capital of both the county and the district. The city is 80 kilometres (50 mi) east of Shiraz, and is surrounded by three lakes: Bakhtegan, Tashk and Maharlu.

== Demographics ==
=== Population ===
At the time of the 2006 National Census, the city's population was 21,683 in 5,189 households, when it was capital of Korbal District of Shiraz County. The following census in 2011 counted 20,920 people in 5,682 households, by which time the district had been separated from the county in the establishment of Kharameh County. Kharameh was transferred to the new Central District as the county's capital, and the capital of Korbal District was transferred to the city of Soltan Shahr. The 2016 census measured the population of the city as 18,477 people in 5,635 households.

== Overview ==
There are several tourist places of interest in Kharameh including Bagh-haye Mehrabad (the Mehrabad Gardens), Tangab, 40 Cheshmeh, Doman nim and Ojagh Seyed.

The main occupation of the inhabitants is agriculture with wheat being the largest produced output.
