= Soltan Shahr =

City in Fars province, Iran

Soltan Shahr Persian: سلطان شهر
- City
- Location within Iran
- Coordinates: 29°37′42″N 53°14′04″E
- Country: Iran
- Province: Fars
- County: Kharameh
- District: Korbal

Population (2016)
  - Total: 1,928
- Time zone: UTC+3:30 (IRST)

Soltan Shahr (Persian: سلطان شهر) (Note: Formerly Soltanabad (سلطان اباد), also romanized as Solţānābād; also known as Sultānābād) is a city in, and the capital of, Korbal District of Kharameh County, Fars province, Iran. The previous capital of the district was the city of Kharameh.

== Demographics ==
=== Population ===
At the time of the 2006 National Census, the population was 2,082 in 506 households, when it was the village of Soltanabad in Dehqanan Rural District of Shiraz County. The following census in 2011 counted 2,485 people in 723 households, by which time the district had been separated from the county in the establishment of Kharameh County. The 2016 census measured the population as 1,928 people in 576 households, when Soltanabad had been elevated to the status of the city of Soltan Shahr.
