= Shahababad =

Shahababad (Persian: شهاب اباد) may refer to:

- Shahababad, Fars
- Shahababad, Kerman
