= Komjan =

Komjan or Kamjan (Persian: كمجان) may refer to:

- Kamjan, Fars
- Komjan, Isfahan
