= Moezzabad-e Jaberi =

City in Fars province, Iran

Moezzabad-e Jaberi Persian: معزاباد جابري
- City
- Location within Iran
- Coordinates: 29°28′55″N 53°22′04″E
- Country: Iran
- Province: Fars
- County: Kharameh
- District: Central

Population (2016)
  - Total: 5,785
- Time zone: UTC+3:30 (IRST)

Moezzabad-e Jaberi (Persian: معزاباد جابري) (Note: Also romanized as Mo‘ezzābād-e Jāberī; also known as Moez Ābād, Mo‘ez Abad Korbal, and Mo‘ezzābād) is a city in the Central District of Kharameh County, Fars province, Iran. As a village, it was the capital of Moezzabad Rural District until its capital was transferred to the village of Hangi-ye Sofla.

== Demographics ==
=== Population ===
At the time of the 2006 National Census, Moezzabad-e Jaberi's population was 5,654 in 1,290 households, when it was a village in Korbal Rural District (Note: Renamed Kafdehak Rural District) of Korbal District, Shiraz County. The following census in 2011 counted 5,935 people in 1,665 households, by which time the district had been separated from the county in the establishment of Kharameh County. The rural district was transferred to the new Central District and renamed Kafdehak Rural District. Moezzabad-e Jaberi was transferred to Moezzabad Rural District created in the district. The 2016 census measured the population of the village as 5,785 people in 1,845 households. It was the most populous village in its rural district.

After the census, Moezzabad-e Jaberi was elevated to the status of a city.
