= Darinan =

Darinan (Persian: درينان) may refer to:

- Darinan, Isfahan
- Darinan, Kerman

== See also ==
- Darniyan (disambiguation)
