= Shahrak-e Isar =

Shahrak-e Isar (Persian: شهرك ايثار) may refer to:

- Shahrak-e Isar, Darab
- Shahrak-e Isar, Kharameh
