= Kamjan, Fars =

Village in Fars province, Iran

Kamjan Persian: كمجان
- Village
- Location within Iran
- Coordinates: 29°38′42″N 53°06′56″E
- Country: Iran
- Province: Fars
- County: Kharameh
- District: Korbal
- Rural District: Dehqanan

Population (2016)
  - Total: 1,734
- Time zone: UTC+3:30 (IRST)

Kamjan (Persian: كمجان) (Note: Also romanized as Kamjān; also known as Gom Jān) is a village in Dehqanan Rural District of Korbal District, Kharameh County, Fars province, Iran.

== Demographics ==
=== Population ===
At the time of the 2006 National Census, the village's population was 1,871 in 478 households, when it was in Shiraz County. The following census in 2011 counted 2,273 people in 594 households, by which time the district had been separated from the county in the establishment of Kharameh County. The 2016 census measured the population of the village as 1,734 people in 539 households. It was the most populous village in its rural district.
