= Rahim Khan, Iran =

Village in West Azerbaijan province, Iran

Rahim Khan Persian: رحيمخان
- Village
- Location within Iran
- Coordinates: 36°47′50″N 46°14′15″E
- Country: Iran
- Province: West Azerbaijan
- County: Bukan
- District: Simmineh
- Rural District: Akhtachi-ye Mahali

Population (2016)
  - Total: 1,820
- Time zone: UTC+3:30 (IRST)

Rahim Khan (Persian: رحيمخان) (Note: Also romanized as Raḩīm Khān) is a village in Akhtachi-ye Mahali Rural District of Simmineh District in Bukan County, West Azerbaijan province, Iran.

== Demographics ==
=== Population ===
At the time of the 2006 National Census, the village's population was 1,738 in 311 households. The following census in 2011 counted 1,804 people in 415 households. The 2016 census measured the population of the village as 1,820 people in 551 households. It was the most populous village in its rural district.
