= Rahim Khan =

Rahim Khan may refer to:

- Rahim Khan of Ganja, ruler of the Ganja Khanate in 1786
- Rahim Khan (field hockey) (born 1971), Pakistan field hockey player
- Rahim Khan (politician) (born 1967), Indian politician in the Karnataka Legislative Assembly
- Rahim Aga Khan (born 1971), eldest son of Prince Karim Aga Khan
- Abdul Rahim Khan-I-Khana (1556–1627), Indian poet, writer and civil servant
- Abdur Rahim Khan (1925–1990), Pakistani general
- Chaudhary Rahim Khan (1923–1987), Indian politician who served in the 8th Lok Sabha from the Faridabad constituency of Haryana
  - Rahim Khan clan, a political family of Haryana, India

== See also ==
- Rahim Khan, Iran, a village in West Azerbaijan Province, Iran
- Rahim Yar Khan, a city in Punjab, Pakistan
