= Kheyrabad-e Tulalli =

City in Fars province, Iran

Kheyrabad-e Tavallali Persian: خيراباد توللي
- City
- Location within Iran
- Coordinates: 29°33′46″N 53°04′34″E
- Country: Iran
- Province: Fars
- County: Kharameh
- District: Central

Population (2016)
  - Total: 3,701
- Time zone: UTC+3:30 (IRST)

Kheyrabad-e Tavallali (Persian: خيرابادتوللي) (Note: Also romanized as Kheyrābād-e Tavallali; also known as Khairābād, Kheyrābād, and Kheyrābād-e Mayāgh) is a city in the Central District of Kharameh County, Fars province, Iran. It was the administrative center for Kheyrabad Rural District until its capital was transferred to the village of Abshur.

== Demographics ==
=== Population ===
At the time of the 2006 National Census, Kheyrabad-e Tulalli's population was 3,268 in 846 households, when it was a village in Kheyrabad Rural District of Korbal District, Shiraz County. The following census in 2011 counted 3,646 people in 1,034 households, by which time the district had been separated from the county in the establishment of Kharameh County. The rural district was transferred to the new Central District. The 2016 census measured the population of the village as 3,701 people in 1,100 households. It was the most populous village in its rural district.

After the census, Kheyrabad-e Tulalli was elevated to the status of a city.
