= Simmineh =

City in West Azerbaijan province, Iran

Simmineh Persian: سیمینه
- City
- Location within Iran
- Coordinates: 36°43′51″N 46°09′10″E
- Country: Iran
- Province: West Azerbaijan
- County: Bukan
- District: Simmineh
- Established as a city: 2002

Population (2016)
  - Total: 1,345
- Time zone: UTC+3:30 (IRST)

Simmineh (Persian: سیمینه) (Note: Also romanized as Simineh and Sīmmīneh; formerly the village of Qarah Musalu (قره موسالو)) is a city in, and the capital of, Simmineh District of Bukan County, West Azerbaijan province, Iran. It also serves as the administrative center for Akhtachi-ye Mahali Rural District. The village of Qarah Musalu was converted to the city of Simmineh in 2002.

== Demographics ==
=== Language ===
The people of Simmineh speak Kurdish.

=== Population ===
At the time of the 2006 National Census, the city's population was 957 in 188 households. The following census in 2011 counted 1,173 people in 274 households. The 2016 census measured the population of the city as 1,345 people in 369 households.
