= Tafihan =

Village in Fars province, Iran

Tafihan Persian: تفیهان
- Village
- Location within Iran
- Coordinates: 29°25′07″N 52°39′26″E
- Country: Iran
- Province: Fars
- County: Shiraz
- District: Central
- Rural District: Bid Zard

Population (2016)
  - Total: 6,170
- Time zone: UTC+3:30 (IRST)

Tafihan (Persian: تفیهان) (Note: Also romanized as Tafihān and Tafīhān; also known as Tafīum, Tafyūn, and Tayūn) is a village in Bid Zard Rural District of the Central District of Shiraz County, Fars province, Iran.

== Demographics ==
=== Population ===
At the time of the 2006 National Census, the village's population was 4,671 in 1,142 households. The following census in 2011 counted 5,510 people in 1,467 households. The 2016 census measured the population of the village as 6,170 people in 1,713 households. It was the most populous village in its rural district.
