= Sari Qomish-e Qeshlaq =

Sari Qomish-e Qeshlaq ساري قميش قشلاق
- Village
- Location within Iran
- Coordinates: 36°28′53″N 46°29′27″E
- Country: Iran
- Province: West Azerbaijan
- County: Bukan
- Bakhsh: Central
- Rural District: Behi-e Feyzolah Beygi

Population (2006)
  - Total: 463
- Time zone: UTC+3:30 (IRST)
  - Summer (DST): UTC+4:30 (IRDT)

Sari Qomish-e Qeshlaq (Persian: ساري قميش قشلاق, also Romanized as Sārī Qomīsh-e Qeshlāq; also known as Sārī Qomīsh) is a village in Behi-e Feyzolah Beygi Rural District, in the Central District of Bukan County, West Azerbaijan Province, Iran. At the 2006 census, its population was 463, in 77 families.
