= Bid Zard-e Olya =

Bid Zard-e Olya بيدزردعليا
- Village
- Location within Iran
- Coordinates: 29°22′35″N 52°40′36″E
- Country: Iran
- Province: Fars
- County: Shiraz
- Bakhsh: Central
- Rural District: Bid Zard

Population (2006)
  - Total: 1,206
- Time zone: UTC+3:30 (IRST)
  - Summer (DST): UTC+4:30 (IRDT)

Bid Zard-e Olya (Persian: بيدزردعليا, also Romanized as Bīd Zard-e 'Olyā; also known as Bīd Zard-e Bālā) is a village in Bid Zard Rural District, in the Central District of Shiraz County, Fars province, Iran. At the 2006 census, its population was 1,206, in 295 families.
