= Qareh Qayah, Kharvana =

Qareh Qayah قره قيه
- Village
- Location within Iran
- Coordinates: 38°40′00″N 46°17′00″E
- Country: Iran
- Province: East Azerbaijan
- County: Varzaqan
- Bakhsh: Kharvana
- Rural District: Dizmar-e Markazi

Population (2006)
  - Total: 37
- Time zone: UTC+3:30 (IRST)
  - Summer (DST): UTC+4:30 (IRDT)

Qareh Qayah (Persian: قره قيه) is a village in Dizmar-e Markazi Rural District, Kharvana District, Varzaqan County, East Azerbaijan Province, Iran. At the 2006 census, its population was 37, in 11 families.
