= Tang Koreh =

Tang Koreh تنگ کره
- Village
- Location within Iran
- Coordinates: 28°29′25″N 53°36′07″E
- Country: Iran
- Province: Fars
- County: Jahrom
- Bakhsh: Central
- Rural District: Jolgah

Population (2006)
  - Total: 302
- Time zone: UTC+3:30 (IRST)
  - Summer (DST): UTC+4:30 (IRDT)

Tang Koreh (Persian: تنگ کره; also known as Kohreh and Rashīdābād) is a village in Jolgah Rural District, in the Central District of Jahrom County, Fars province, Iran. At the 2006 census, its population was 302, in 72 families.
