= Bid-e Zard, Shibkaveh =

Bid-e Zard بيدزرد
- Village
- Location within Iran
- Coordinates: 28°42′07″N 53°56′07″E
- Country: Iran
- Province: Fars
- County: Fasa
- Bakhsh: Shibkaveh
- Rural District: Miyan Deh

Population (2006)
  - Total: 683
- Time zone: UTC+3:30 (IRST)
  - Summer (DST): UTC+4:30 (IRDT)

Bid-e Zard (Persian: بيدزرد, also Romanized as Bīd-e Zard) is a village in Miyan Deh Rural District, Shibkaveh District, Fasa County, Fars province, Iran. At the 2006 census, its population was 683, in 134 families.
