= Qarah Qayeh, Kurdistan =

Qarah Qayeh قره قايه
- Village
- Location within Iran
- Coordinates: 35°55′52″N 47°17′08″E
- Country: Iran
- Province: Kurdistan
- County: Divandarreh
- Bakhsh: Central
- Rural District: Howmeh

Population (2006)
  - Total: 40
- Time zone: UTC+3:30 (IRST)
  - Summer (DST): UTC+4:30 (IRDT)

Qarah Qayeh (Persian: قره قايه, also Romanized as Qarah Qāyeh and Qāreh Qāyeh) is a village in Howmeh Rural District, in the Central District of Divandarreh County, Kurdistan Province, Iran. At the 2006 census, its population was 40, in 6 families. The village is populated by Kurds.
