= Bid Zard-e Asmari =

Coordinates: 31°40′41″N 49°35′04″E

Bid Zard-e Asmari بيدزرداسماري
- Village
- Interactive map of Bid Zard-e Asmari
- Country: Iran
- Province: Khuzestan
- County: Bagh-e Malek
- Bakhsh: Central
- Rural District: Rud Zard

Population (2006)
  - Total: 12
- Time zone: UTC+3:30 (IRST)
  - Summer (DST): UTC+4:30 (IRDT)

Bid Zard-e Asmari (Persian: بيدزرداسماري, also Romanized as Bīd Zard-e Āsmārī) is a village in Rud Zard Rural District, in the Central District of Bagh-e Malek County, Khuzestan Province, Iran. At the 2006 census, its population was 12, in 5 families.
