= Kulabad, Lorestan =

Kulabad کول آباد
- Village
- Location within Iran
- Coordinates: 33°36′53″N 48°58′27″E
- Country: Iran
- Province: Lorestan
- County: Dorud
- Bakhsh: Silakhor
- Rural District: Silakhor

Population (2006)
  - Total: 253
- Time zone: UTC+3:30 (IRST)
  - Summer (DST): UTC+4:30 (IRDT)

Kulabad (Persian: کول آباد, also Romanized as Kūlābād; also known as Kūyābād) is a village in Silakhor Rural District, Silakhor District, Dorud County, Lorestan Province, Iran. At the 2006 census, its population was 253, in 47 families.
