= Owrta Kand, East Azerbaijan =

Owrta Kand اورتاكند
- Village
- Location within Iran
- Coordinates: 37°56′37″N 47°52′56″E
- Country: Iran
- Province: East Azerbaijan
- County: Sarab
- Bakhsh: Central
- Rural District: Sain

Population (2006)
  - Total: 125
- Time zone: UTC+3:30 (IRST)
  - Summer (DST): UTC+4:30 (IRDT)

Owrta Kand (Persian: اورتاكند, also Romanized as Owrtā Kand and Ūrtā Kand) is a village in Sain Rural District, in the Central District of Sarab County, East Azerbaijan Province, Iran. At the 2006 census, its population was 125, in 19 families.
