= Qarah Qayah, Sarab =

Qarah Qayah قره قيه
- Village
- Location within Iran
- Coordinates: 38°03′34″N 47°28′11″E
- Country: Iran
- Province: East Azerbaijan
- County: Sarab
- Bakhsh: Central
- Rural District: Razliq

Population (2006)
  - Total: 291
- Time zone: UTC+3:30 (IRST)
  - Summer (DST): UTC+4:30 (IRDT)

Qarah Qayah (Persian: قره قيه, also Romanized as Qareh Qayeh) is a village in Razliq Rural District, in the Central District of Sarab County, East Azerbaijan Province, Iran. At the 2006 census, its population was 291, in 66 families.
