= Sari Qamish, East Azerbaijan =

Sari Qamish ساري قمش
- Village
- Location within Iran
- Coordinates: 37°13′34″N 47°17′54″E
- Country: Iran
- Province: East Azerbaijan
- County: Charuymaq
- Bakhsh: Shadian
- Rural District: Charuymaq-e Sharqi

Population (2006)
  - Total: 41
- Time zone: UTC+3:30 (IRST)
  - Summer (DST): UTC+4:30 (IRDT)

Sari Qamish (Persian: ساري قمش, also Romanized as Sārī Qamīsh) is a village in Charuymaq-e Sharqi Rural District, Shadian District, Charuymaq County, East Azerbaijan Province, Iran. At the 2006 census, its population was 41, in 8 families.
