= Bid Zardi =

Bid Zardi بيدزردي
- Village
- Location within Iran
- Coordinates: 29°47′14″N 51°08′21″E
- Country: Iran
- Province: Fars
- County: Mamasani
- Bakhsh: Mahvarmilani
- Rural District: Mishan

Population (2006)
  - Total: 52
- Time zone: UTC+3:30 (IRST)
  - Summer (DST): UTC+4:30 (IRDT)

Bid Zardi (Persian: بيدزردي, also Romanized as Bīd Zardī; also known as Bīd Zard) is a village in Mishan Rural District, Mahvarmilani District, Mamasani County, Fars province, Iran. At the 2006 census, its population was 52, in 13 families.
