= Rashidabad, East Azerbaijan =

Rashidabad رشيداباد
- Village
- Location within Iran
- Coordinates: 37°22′07″N 48°05′32″E
- Country: Iran
- Province: East Azerbaijan
- County: Meyaneh
- Bakhsh: Kaghazkonan
- Rural District: Kaghazkonan-e Shomali

Population (2006)
  - Total: 101
- Time zone: UTC+3:30 (IRST)
  - Summer (DST): UTC+4:30 (IRDT)

Rashidabad (Persian: رشيداباد, also Romanized as Rashīdābād; also known as Eleshtava and Yeleshtava) is a small village in Kaghazkonan-e Shomali Rural District, Kaghazkonan District, Meyaneh County, East Azerbaijan Province, Iran. At the 2006 census, its population was 101, in 36 families.

== History ==
Rashidabad began as the sprawling endowment complex Rab Rashidi, founded by the eminent Ilkhanid vizier Rashid‑al‑Din Fazl‑Allah (d. 1318 CE). Situated east of Tabriz, it was conceived as a university‑city with extensive religious, educational, medical, and civic functions. It comprised a main academic quarter, a residential precinct with mosques, baths, caravansaries, bazaars, gardens, qanats, defensive walls, gates, and public buildings.

The complex included specialized neighborhoods: one for Quran scholars (with around 200 reciters), another for jurists and theologians (about 400), plus a hall of medicine with some 50 expert physicians and trainees. By the years 1307–1318 CE, Rashidabad was a vibrant academic metropolis; the largest endowment-funded campus in the Islamic world. Following Rashid‑al‑Din’s execution in 1318 by order of Ilkhan Öljaitü (Aba-Sa'id), the complex entered a phase of neglect. His son Ghiyāth‑al‑Din made efforts to restore it, but internal turmoil and shifting patronage left it in decline.

In 1611, while Tabriz was under Safavid control following Ottoman-Safavid conflicts, Shah Abbas I repurposed the long-ruined Rabʿ‑e Rashidi complex into a fort and governor’s residence, utilizing materials from the Ilkhanid structures. The new construction included towers, water cisterns, a bath, and a mansion.

In 2007, the Deed of Endowment of Rabʿ‑i Rashidi, a 13th-century manuscript detailing the waqf (Islamic endowment) that funded the Rabʿ‑i Rashidi educational complex in Tabriz, was officially inscribed on UNESCO’s Memory of the World Register.
