= Gavmishan, Mahabad =

Gavmishan گاوميشان
- Village
- Location within Iran
- Coordinates: 36°23′34″N 45°44′41″E
- Country: Iran
- Province: West Azerbaijan
- County: Mahabad
- Bakhsh: Khalifan
- Rural District: Kani Bazar

Population (2006)
  - Total: 149
- Time zone: UTC+3:30 (IRST)
  - Summer (DST): UTC+4:30 (IRDT)

Gavmishan (Persian: گاوميشان, also Romanized as Gāvmīshān) is a village in Kani Bazar Rural District, Khalifan District, Mahabad County, West Azerbaijan Province, Iran. At the 2006 census, its population was 149, in 21 families.
