= Bid Zard, Kazerun =

Bidzard بيدزرد
- Village
- Location within Iran
- Coordinates: 29°21′08″N 51°52′47″E
- Country: Iran
- Province: Fars
- County: Kazerun
- Bakhsh: Jereh and Baladeh
- Rural District: Jereh

Population (2006)
  - Total: 684
- Time zone: UTC+3:30 (IRST)
  - Summer (DST): UTC+4:30 (IRDT)

Bidzard (Persian: بيدزرد, also Romanized as Bidzard) is a village in Jereh Rural District, Jereh and Baladeh District, Kazerun County, Fars province, Iran. At the 2006 census, its population was 684, in 134 families.
