= Moezzabad Rural District =

Rural district in Fars province, Iran

Moezzabad Rural District Persian: دهستان معزآباد
- Rural District
- Location within Iran
- Coordinates: 29°26′42″N 53°27′10″E
- Country: Iran
- Province: Fars
- County: Kharameh
- District: Central
- Capital: Hangi-ye Sofla

Population (2016)
  - Total: 8,627
- Time zone: UTC+3:30 (IRST)

Moezzabad Rural District (Persian: دهستان معزآباد) is in the Central District of Kharameh County, Fars province, Iran. Its capital is the village of Hangi-ye Sofla. The previous capital of the rural district was the village of Moezzabad-e Jaberi, now a city.

== History ==
After the 2006 National Census, Korbal District was separated from Shiraz County in the establishment of Kharameh County, and Moezzabad Rural District was established in the new Central District.

== Demographics ==
=== Population ===
At the time of the 2011 census, the rural district's population was 8,710 in 2,406 households. The 2016 census measured the population of the rural district as 8,627 in 2,697 households. The most populous of its six villages was Moezzabad-e Jaberi (now a city), with 5,785 people.
