= Manuchehri, Fars =

Manuchehri منوچهري
- Village
- Country: Iran
- Province: Fars
- County: Darab
- Bakhsh: Rostaq
- Rural District: Rostaq

Population (2006)
  - Total: 42
- Time zone: UTC+3:30 (IRST)
  - Summer (DST): UTC+4:30 (IRDT)

Manuchehri (Persian: منوچهري, also Romanized as Manūchehrī) is a village in Rostaq Rural District, Rostaq District, Darab County, Fars province, Iran. At the 2006 census, its population was 42, in 10 families.
