= Bid Zard, Izeh =

Bid Zard بيدزرد
- Village
- Location within Iran
- Coordinates: 31°40′41″N 49°35′03″E
- Country: Iran
- Province: Khuzestan
- County: Izeh
- Bakhsh: Central
- Rural District: Holayjan

Population (2006)
  - Total: 124
- Time zone: UTC+3:30 (IRST)
  - Summer (DST): UTC+4:30 (IRDT)

Bid Zard (Persian: بيدزرد, also Romanized as Bīd Zard, Bīdzard, and Bid-i-Zard) is a village in Holayjan Rural District, in the Central District of Izeh County, Khuzestan Province, Iran. At the 2006 census, its population was 124, in 23 families.
