= Bid Zard-e Sofla =

Village in Fars province, Iran

Bid Zard-e Sofla Persian: بيدزرد سفلي
- Village
- Location within Iran
- Coordinates: 29°22′55″N 52°40′42″E
- Country: Iran
- Province: Fars
- County: Shiraz
- District: Central
- Rural District: Bid Zard

Population (2016)
  - Total: 2,354
- Time zone: UTC+3:30 (IRST)

Bid Zard-e Sofla (Persian: بيدزردسفلي) (Note: Also romanized as Bīd Zard-e Soflá; also known as Bīd Zard, Bīd Zard-e Pā’īn, and Bīd-i-Zard) is a village in, and the capital of, Bid Zard Rural District of the Central District of Shiraz County, Fars province, Iran.

== Demographics ==
=== Population ===
At the time of the 2006 National Census, the village's population was 2,112 in 495 households. The following census in 2011 counted 2,425 people in 631 households. The 2016 census measured the population of the village as 2,354 people in 551 households.
