= Qavamabad, Kerman =

Qavamabad قوام اباد
- Village
- Location within Iran
- Coordinates: 30°38′45″N 56°46′05″E
- Country: Iran
- Province: Kerman
- County: Kerman
- Bakhsh: Chatrud
- Rural District: Kavirat

Population (2006)
  - Total: 883
- Time zone: UTC+3:30 (IRST)
  - Summer (DST): UTC+4:30 (IRDT)

Qavamabad (Persian: قوام اباد, also Romanized as Qavāmābād; also known as Qowmābād and Qumābād) is a village in Kavirat Rural District, Chatrud District, Kerman County, Kerman Province, Iran. At the 2006 census, its population was 883, in 201 families.
