= Rashidabad, Kermanshah =

Rashidabad رشيداباد
- Village
- Location within Iran
- Coordinates: 34°39′39″N 47°28′51″E
- Country: Iran
- Province: Kermanshah
- County: Sahneh
- Bakhsh: Dinavar
- Rural District: Dinavar

Population (2006)
  - Total: 85
- Time zone: UTC+3:30 (IRST)
  - Summer (DST): UTC+4:30 (IRDT)

Rashidabad (Persian: رشيداباد, also Romanized as Rashīdābād) is a village in Dinavar Rural District, Dinavar District, Sahneh County, Kermanshah Province, Iran. At the 2006 census, its population was 85, in 27 families.
