= Aşağı Salamabad =

- Municipality
- Location within Azerbaijan
- Coordinates: 40°42′44″N 47°12′59″E
- Country: Azerbaijan
- Rayon: Yevlakh

Population
  - Total: 923
- Time zone: UTC+4 (AZT)
  - Summer (DST): UTC+5 (AZT)

Aşağı Salamabad (also, Ashagy Salamabad) is a village and municipality in the Yevlakh Rayon of Azerbaijan. It has a population of 923.
