= Rashidabad, Kurdistan =

Rashidabad رشيد آباد
- Village
- Location within Iran
- Coordinates: 35°57′23″N 47°02′25″E
- Country: Iran
- Province: Kurdistan
- County: Divandarreh
- Bakhsh: Central
- Rural District: Howmeh

Population (2006)
  - Total: 1,197
- Time zone: UTC+3:30 (IRST)
  - Summer (DST): UTC+4:30 (IRDT)

Rashidabad (Persian: رشيد آباد, also Romanized as Rashīdābād) is a village in Howmeh Rural District, in the Central District of Divandarreh County, Kurdistan Province, Iran. At the 2006 census, its population was 1,197, in 249 families. The village is populated by Kurds.
