= Qavamabad, Rafsanjan =

Qavamabad قوام اباد
- Village
- Location within Iran
- Coordinates: 30°28′37″N 55°57′54″E
- Country: Iran
- Province: Kerman
- County: Rafsanjan
- Bakhsh: Central
- Rural District: Razmavaran

Population (2006)
  - Total: 632
- Time zone: UTC+3:30 (IRST)
  - Summer (DST): UTC+4:30 (IRDT)

Qavamabad (Persian: قوام اباد, also Romanized as Qavāmābād; also known as ‘Alīābād) is a village in Razmavaran Rural District, in the Central District of Rafsanjan County, Kerman Province, Iran. At the 2006 census, its population was 632, in 155 families.
