= Teghnit-e Vasat =

Teghnit-e Vasat تغنيت وسط
- Village
- Location within Iran
- Coordinates: 38°59′52″N 44°23′10″E
- Country: Iran
- Province: West Azerbaijan
- County: Chaldoran
- Bakhsh: Central
- Rural District: Chaldoran-e Jonubi

Population (2006)
  - Total: 66
- Time zone: UTC+3:30 (IRST)
  - Summer (DST): UTC+4:30 (IRDT)

Teghnit-e Vasat (Persian: تغنيت وسط, also Romanized as Teghnīt-e Vasaţ; also known as Ūrtākand) is a village in Chaldoran-e Jonubi Rural District, in the Central District of Chaldoran County, West Azerbaijan Province, Iran. According to the 2006 census, its population is 66, in 12 families.
