= Darniyan, Kerman =

Darniyan درنيان
- Village
- Location within Iran
- Coordinates: 28°43′31″N 58°24′10″E
- Country: Iran
- Province: Kerman
- County: Narmashir
- Bakhsh: Rud Ab
- Rural District: Rud Ab-e Gharbi

Population (2006)
  - Total: 8
- Time zone: UTC+3:30 (IRST)
  - Summer (DST): UTC+4:30 (IRDT)

Darniyan (Persian: درنيان, also Romanized as Darnīyān; also known as Darīnān and Dar Nīān) is a village in Rud Ab-e Gharbi Rural District, Rud Ab District, Narmashir County, Kerman Province, Iran. At the 2006 census, its population was 8, in 4 families.
