= Bid Zard Rural District =

Rural district in Fars province, Iran

Bid Zard Rural District Persian: دهستان بيدزرد
- Rural District
- Location within Iran
- Coordinates: 29°24′53″N 52°38′07″E
- Country: Iran
- Province: Fars
- County: Shiraz
- District: Central
- Capital: Bid Zard-e Sofla

Population (2016)
  - Total: 22,063
- Time zone: UTC+3:30 (IRST)

Bid Zard Rural District (Persian: دهستان بيدزرد) is in the Central District of Shiraz County, Fars province, Iran. Its capital is the village of Bid Zard-e Sofla.

== Demographics ==
=== Population ===
At the time of the 2006 National Census, the rural district's population was 18,468 in 4,618 households. There were 20,690 inhabitants in 5,651 households at the following census of 2011. The 2016 census measured the population of the rural district as 22,063 in 6,393 households. The most populous of its 36 villages was Tafihan, with 6,170 people.
