= Kheyrabad Rural District (Kharameh County) =

Rural district in Fars province, Iran

Kheyrabad Rural District Persian: دهستان خيرآباد
- Rural District
- Location within Iran
- Coordinates: 29°30′12″N 53°05′21″E
- Country: Iran
- Province: Fars
- County: Kharameh
- District: Central
- Capital: Abshur

Population (2016)
  - Total: 6,616
- Time zone: UTC+3:30 (IRST)

Kheyrabad Rural District (Persian: دهستان خيرآباد) is in the Central District of Kharameh County, Fars province, Iran. Its capital is the village of Abshur. The rural district was previously administered from the city of Kheyrabad-e Tulalli.

== Demographics ==
=== Population ===
At the time of the 2006 National Census, the rural district's population (as a part of Korbal District of Shiraz County) was 5,841 in 1,475 households. There were 6,514 inhabitants in 1,799 households at the following census of 2011, by which time the district had been separated from the county in the establishment of Kharameh County. The rural district was transferred to the new Central District. The 2016 census measured the population of the rural district as 6,616 in 1,943 households. The most populous of its 17 villages was Kheyrabad-e Tulalli (now a city), with 3,701 people.
