= Dehqanan Rural District =

Rural district in Fars province, Iran

Dehqanan Rural District Persian: دهستان دهقانان
- Rural District
- Location within Iran
- Coordinates: 29°39′16″N 53°09′45″E
- Country: Iran
- Province: Fars
- County: Kharameh
- District: Korbal
- Capital: Dehqanan

Population (2016)
  - Total: 4,803
- Time zone: UTC+3:30 (IRST)

Dehqanan Rural District (Persian: دهستان دهقانان) is in Korbal District of Kharameh County, Fars province, Iran. Its capital is the village of Dehqanan.

== Demographics ==
=== Population ===
At the time of the 2006 National Census, the rural district's population (as a part of Shiraz County) was 7,614 in 1,888 households. There were 8,736 inhabitants in 2,450 households at the following census of 2011, by which time the district had been separated from the county in the establishment of Kharameh County. The 2016 census measured the population of the rural district as 4,803 in 1,476 households. The most populous of its 12 villages was Kamjan, with 1,734 people.
