= Sofla Rural District (Kharameh County) =

Rural district in Fars province, Iran

Sofla Rural District Persian: دهستان سفلي
- Rural District
- Location within Iran
- Coordinates: 29°35′10″N 53°21′39″E
- Country: Iran
- Province: Fars
- County: Kharameh
- District: Korbal
- Capital: Sofla

Population (2016)
  - Total: 7,023
- Time zone: UTC+3:30 (IRST)

Sofla Rural District (Persian: دهستان سفلي) is in Korbal District of Kharameh County, Fars province, Iran. Its capital is the village of Sofla.

== Demographics ==
=== Population ===
At the time of the 2006 National Census, the rural district's population (as a part of Shiraz County) was 6,618 in 1,611 households. There were 8,317 inhabitants in 2,495 households at the following census of 2011, by which time the district had been separated from the county in the establishment of Kharameh County. The 2016 census measured the population of the rural district as 7,023 in 2,287 households. The most populous of its 17 villages was Sofla, with 888 people.
