= Kafdehak Rural District =

Rural district in Fars province, Iran

Kafdehak Rural District Persian: دهستان كفدهك
- Rural District
- Location within Iran
- Coordinates: 29°28′18″N 53°14′29″E
- Country: Iran
- Province: Fars
- County: Kharameh
- District: Central
- Capital: Kafdehak

Population (2016)
  - Total: 7,390
- Time zone: UTC+3:30 (IRST)

Kafdehak Rural District (Persian: دهستان كفدهك) (Note: Formerly Korbal Rural District (دهستان كربال)) is in the Central District of Kharameh County, Fars province, Iran. Its capital is the village of Kafdehak.

== Demographics ==
=== Population ===
At the time of the 2006 National Census, the rural district's population (as Korbal Rural District of Korbal District of Shiraz County) was 15,616 in 3,568 households. There were 8,383 inhabitants in 2,248 households at the following census of 2011, by which time the district had been separated from the county in the establishment of Kharameh County. The rural district was transferred to the new Central District and renamed Kafdehak Rural District. The 2016 census measured the population of the rural district as 7,390 in 2,260 households. The most populous of its 33 villages was Kafdehak, with 1,556 people.
