= Korbal District =

District in Fars province, Iran

Korbal District Persian: بخش کربال
- District
- Location within Iran
- Coordinates: 29°36′43″N 53°16′22″E
- Country: Iran
- Province: Fars
- County: Kharameh
- Capital: Soltan Shahr

Population (2016)
  - Total: 13,754
- Time zone: UTC+3:30 (IRST)

Korbal District (Persian: بخش کربال) is in Kharameh County, Fars province, Iran. Its capital is the city of Soltan Shahr. (Note: Formerly the village of Soltanabad) The district was previously administered from the city of Kharameh.

== Demographics ==
=== Population ===
At the time of the 2006 National Census, the district's population (as a part of Shiraz County) was 14,232 in 3,499 households. The following census in 2011 counted 17,053 people in 4,945 households, by which time the district had been separated from the county in the establishment of Kharameh County. The 2016 census measured the population of the district as 13,754 inhabitants in 4,339 households.

=== Administrative divisions ===
Korbal District Population (Note: As a part of Shiraz County at the 2006 census)
Administrative Divisions	2006	2011	2016
Dehqanan RD	7,614	8,736	4,803
Kheyrabad RD (Note: Transferred to the Central District of Kharameh County)	5,841		
Korbal RD (Note: Renamed Kafdehak Rural District)	15,616		
Sofla RD	6,618	8,317	7,023
Soltan Shahr (city)			1,928
Kharameh (city)	21,683		
Total	57,372	17,053	13,754
RD = Rural District
