= Akhtachi-ye Sharqi Rural District =

Rural district in West Azerbaijan province, Iran

Akhtachi-ye Sharqi Rural District Persian: دهستان آختاچی شرقی
- Rural District
- Location within Iran
- Coordinates: 36°38′N 46°09′E
- Country: Iran
- Province: West Azerbaijan
- County: Bukan
- District: Simmineh
- Established: 1987
- Capital: Dash Band

Population (2016)
  - Total: 11,877
- Time zone: UTC+3:30 (IRST)

Akhtachi-ye Sharqi Rural District (Persian: دهستان آختاچی شرقی) is in Simmineh District of Bukan County, West Azerbaijan province, Iran. Its capital is the village of Dash Band.

== Demographics ==
=== Population ===
At the time of the 2006 National Census, the rural district's population was 9,571 in 1,739 households. There were 9,916 inhabitants in 2,358 households at the following census of 2011. The 2016 census measured the population of the rural district as 11,877 in 3,514 households. The most populous of its 23 villages was Nachit, with 2,850 people.

=== Other villages in the rural district ===
- Gerd Qebran
- Hammamian
- Uch Tappeh
