= Behi Dehbokri Rural District =

Rural district in West Azerbaijan province, Iran

Behi Dehbokri Rural District Persian: دهستان بهي دهبكرئ
- Rural District
- Location within Iran
- Coordinates: 36°37′N 46°22′E
- Country: Iran
- Province: West Azerbaijan
- County: Bukan
- District: Simmineh
- Established: 1987
- Capital: Javanmard

Population (2016)
  - Total: 3,333
- Time zone: UTC+3:30 (IRST)

Behi Dehbokri Rural District (Persian: دهستان بهي دهبكرئ) is in Simmineh District of Bukan County, West Azerbaijan province, Iran. Its capital is the village of Javanmard.

== Demographics ==
=== Population ===
At the time of the 2006 National Census, the rural district's population was 4,357 in 845 households. There were 3,747 inhabitants in 899 households at the following census of 2011. The 2016 census measured the population of the rural district as 3,333 in 1,038 households. The most populous of its 25 villages was Javanmard, with 646 people.

=== Other villages in the rural district ===
- Aghjivan
- Gol Tappeh-ye Qurmish
- Qazi Akhavi
- Torkasheh
