= Akhtachi-ye Mahali Rural District =

Rural district in West Azerbaijan province, Iran

Akhtachi-ye Mahali Rural District Persian: دهستان آختاچی محالی
- Rural District
- Location within Iran
- Coordinates: 36°47′N 46°11′E
- Country: Iran
- Province: West Azerbaijan
- County: Bukan
- District: Simmineh
- Established: 1987
- Capital: Simmineh

Population (2016)
  - Total: 10,117
- Time zone: UTC+3:30 (IRST)

Akhtachi-ye Mahali Rural District (Persian: دهستان آختاچی محالی) is in Simmineh District of Bukan County, West Azerbaijan province, Iran. It is administered from the city of Simmineh. (Note: Formerly the village of Qarah Musalu)

== Demographics ==
=== Population ===
At the time of the 2006 National Census, the rural district's population was 10,516 in 2,016 households. There were 10,146 inhabitants in 2,390 households at the following census of 2011. The 2016 census measured the population of the rural district as 10,117 in 3,228 households. The most populous of its 35 villages was Rahim Khan, with 1,820 people.

=== Other villages in the rural district ===
- Hajji Lak
- Hajjiabad-e Akhtachi
- Hoseyn Mameh
- Qarah Gol, Bukan
- Sarab-e Rahim Khan
- Sari Qomish
