= Central District (Kharameh County) =

District in Fars province, Iran

Central District (Kharameh County) Persian: بخش مرکزی شهرستان خرامه
- District
- Location within Iran
- Coordinates: 29°29′12″N 53°16′37″E
- Country: Iran
- Province: Fars
- County: Kharameh
- Capital: Kharameh

Population (2016)
  - Total: 41,110
- Time zone: UTC+3:30 (IRST)

The Central District of Kharameh County (Persian: بخش مرکزی شهرستان خرامه) is in Fars province, Iran. Its capital is the city of Kharameh.

== History ==
After the 2006 National Census, Korbal District was separated from Shiraz County in the establishment of Kharameh County, which was divided into two districts and five rural districts, with Kharameh as its capital and only city at the time.

After the 2016 census, the villages of Kheyrabad-e Tulalli and Moezzabad-e Jaberi were elevated to city status.

== Demographics ==
=== Population ===
At the time of the 2011 census, the district's population was 44,527 people in 12,135 households. The 2016 census measured the population of the district as 41,110 inhabitants in 12,535 households.

=== Administrative divisions ===
Central District (Kharameh County) Population
Administrative Divisions	2011	2016
Kafdehak RD (Note: Formerly Korbal Rural District)	8,383	7,390
Kheyrabad RD	6,514	6,616
Moezzabad RD	8,710	8,627
Kharameh (city)	20,920	18,477
Kheyrabad-e Tulalli (city) (Note: Became a city after the 2016 census)		
Moezzabad-e Jaberi (city)		
Total	44,527	41,110
RD = Rural District
