= Kharameh County =

County in Fars province, Iran

Kharameh County Persian: شهرستان خرامه
- County
- Location of Kharameh County in Fars province (top right, pink)

- Location of Fars province in Iran
- Coordinates: 29°31′N 53°17′E
- Country: Iran
- Province: Fars
- Capital: Kharameh
- Districts: Central, Korbal

Population (2016)
  - Total: 54,864
- Time zone: UTC+3:30 (IRST)

Kharameh County (Persian: شهرستان خرامه) is in Fars province, Iran. Its capital is the city of Kharameh.

== History ==
After the 2006 National Census, Korbal District was separated from Shiraz County in the establishment of Kharameh County, which was divided into two districts and five rural districts, with Kharameh as its capital and only city at the time.

After the 2011 census, the village of Soltanabad rose to the status of a city as Soltan Shahr. After the 2016 census, the villages of Kheyrabad-e Tulalli and Moezzabad-e Jaberi were elevated to city status.

== Demographics ==
=== Population ===
At the time of the 2011 census, the county's population was 61,580 people in 17,076 households. The 2016 census measured the population of the county as 54,864 in 16,874 households.

=== Administrative divisions ===
Kharameh County's population history and administrative structure over two consecutive censuses are shown in the following table.

Kharameh County Population
Administrative Divisions	2011	2016
Central District	44,527	41,110
Kafdehak RD (Note: Formerly Korbal Rural District)	8,383	7,390
Kheyrabad RD	6,514	6,616
Moezzabad RD	8,710	8,627
Kharameh (city)	20,920	18,477
Kheyrabad-e Tulalli (city) (Note: Became a city after the 2016 census)		
Moezzabad-e Jaberi (city)		
Korbal District	17,053	13,754
Dehqanan RD	8,736	4,803
Sofla RD	8,317	7,023
Soltan Shahr (city) (Note: Formerly Soltanabad)		1,928
Total	61,580	54,864
RD = Rural District

== See also ==
Media related to Kherameh County at Wikimedia Commons
