= Simmineh District =

District in West Azerbaijan province, Iran

Simmineh District Persian: بخش سیمینه
- District
- Location within Iran
- Coordinates: 36°41′N 46°15′E
- Country: Iran
- Province: West Azerbaijan
- County: Bukan
- Established: 1990
- Capital: Simmineh

Population (2016)
  - Total: 26,672
- Time zone: UTC+3:30 (IRST)

Simmineh District (Persian: بخش سیمینه) is in Bukan County, West Azerbaijan province, Iran. Its capital is the city of Simmineh. (Note: Formerly the village of Qarah Musalu)

== Demographics ==
=== Language ===
The people of Simmineh speak Kurdish.

=== Population ===
At the time of the 2006 National Census, the district's population was 25,401 in 4,788 households. The following census in 2011 counted 24,982 people in 5,921 households. The 2016 census measured the population of the district as 26,672 inhabitants in 8,149 households.

=== Administrative divisions ===
Simmineh District Population
Administrative Divisions	2006	2011	2016
Akhtachi-ye Mahali RD	10,516	10,146	10,117
Akhtachi-ye Sharqi RD	9,571	9,916	11,877
Behi Dehbokri RD	4,357	3,747	3,333
Simmineh (city)	957	1,173	1,345
Total	25,401	24,982	26,672
RD = Rural District
