= Bukan County =

County in West Azerbaijan province, Iran

Bukan County Persian: شهرستان بوکان
- County
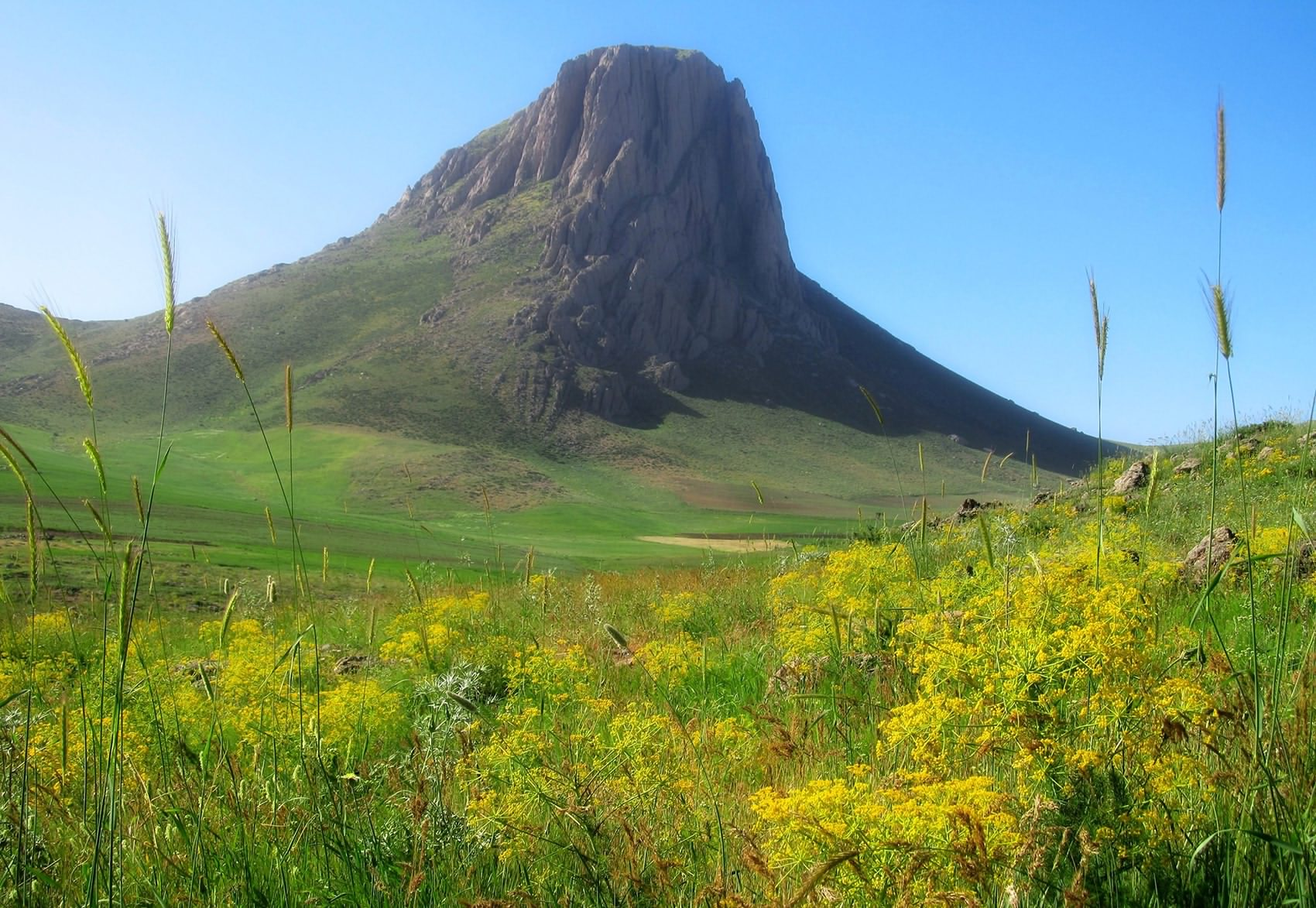
- Kuh Taragheh

- Location of Bukan County in West Azerbaijan province (bottom right, pink)

- Location of West Azerbaijan province in Iran
- Coordinates: 36°32′N 46°03′E
- Country: Iran
- Province: West Azerbaijan
- Established: 1990
- Capital: Bukan
- Districts: Central, Simmineh

Population (2016)
  - Total: 251,409
- Time zone: UTC+3:30 (IRST)

Bukan County (Persian: شهرستان بوکان) is in West Azerbaijan province, Iran. Its capital is the city of Bukan.

== Demographics ==
=== Language ===
The county is mostly populated by Shafi'i Kurds who speak Sorani.

=== Population ===
At the time of the 2006 National Census, the county's population was 202,637 in 42,313 households. The following census in 2011 counted 224,628 people in 56,105 households. The 2016 census measured the population of the county as 251,409 in 74,250 households.

=== Administrative divisions ===
Bukan County's population history and administrative structure over three consecutive censuses are shown in the following table.

Bukan County Population
Administrative Divisions	2006	2011	2016
Central District	177,236	199,646	224,731
Akhtachi RD	7,050	8,871	9,911
Behi-ye Feyzolah Beygi RD	8,746	9,477	11,508
Il Gavark RD	5,798	5,179	4,596
Il Teymur RD	6,302	5,519	5,215
Bukan (city)	149,340	170,600	193,501
Simmineh District	25,401	24,982	26,672
Akhtachi-ye Mahali RD	10,516	10,146	10,117
Akhtachi-ye Sharqi RD	9,571	9,916	11,877
Behi Dehbokri RD	4,357	3,747	3,333
Simmineh (city) (Note: Formerly the village of Qarah Musalu)	957	1,173	1,345
Total	202,637	224,628	251,409
RD = Rural District

== Notable people ==
The world's shortest man originates from Bukan.

== See also ==
Media related to Bukan County at Wikimedia Commons
