= Salarabad =

Salarabad (Persian: سَلار آباد) may refer to:

- Salarabad, East Azerbaijan
- Salarabad, Hamadan
- Salarabad, Kerman
- Salarabad, Kuzaran, Kermanshah Province
- Salarabad, Miyan Darband, Kermanshah Province
- Salarabad, Razavar, Kermanshah Province
- Salarabad, Sonqor, Kermanshah Province
- Salarabad, Khuzestan
- Salarabad-e Chenar, Kohgiluyeh and Boyer-Ahmad Province
- Salarabad, Kurdistan
- Salarabad, Razavi Khorasan
- Salarabad, Tehran
- Salarabad, Zanjan
- Salarabad-e Nadar, Lorestan Province
