= Lotfabad (disambiguation) =

Lotfabad is a city in Razavi Khorasan Province, Iran.

Lotfabad (Persian: لطف اباد) may refer to:

- Lotfabad, East Azerbaijan
- Lotfabad, Anar, Kerman Province
- Lotfabad, Anbarabad, Kerman Province
- Lotfabad, Narmashir, Kerman Province
- Lotfabad, Rafsanjan, Kerman Province
- Lotfabad, Sardasht, Dezful County, Khuzestan Province
- Lotfabad, Seyyedvaliyeddin, Dezful County, Khuzestan Province
- Lotfabad, Nishapur, Razavi Khorasan Province
- Lotfabad District, in Razavi Khorasan Province
