= Qareh Gol, Leylan =

Village in East Azerbaijan province, Iran

Qareh Gol Persian: قره گل
- Village
- Location within Iran
- Coordinates: 36°59′30″N 46°15′09″E
- Country: Iran
- Province: East Azerbaijan
- County: Leylan
- District: Shirin Kand
- Rural District: Leylan-e Sharqi

Population (2016)
  - Total: 770
- Time zone: UTC+3:30 (IRST)

Qareh Gol (Persian: قره گل) is a village in Leylan-e Sharqi Rural District of Shirin Kand District in Leylan County, East Azerbaijan province, Iran.

== Demographics ==
=== Population ===
At the time of the 2006 National Census, the village's population was 654 in 157 households, when it was in Leylan-e Jonubi Rural District (Note: Formerly Leylan Rural District) of Leylan District (Note: Renamed the Central District of Leylan County) in Malekan County. The following census in 2011 counted 773 people in 202 households. The 2016 census measured the population of the village as 770 people in 217 households.

In 2023, the district was separated from the county in the establishment of Leylan County and renamed the Central District. Qareh Gol was transferred to Leylan-e Sharqi Rural District created in the new Shirin Kand District.
