= Gavdul =

Gavdul (Persian: گاو دول) may refer to:

- Gavdul, Ardabil
- Gavdul, East Azerbaijan
- Gavdul, Ilam
- Gavdul-e Gharbi Rural District
- Gavdul-e Markazi Rural District
- Gavdul-e Sharqi Rural District
