= Cheghalu =

Village in East Azerbaijan province, Iran

Cheghalu Persian: چغالو
- Village
- Location within Iran
- Coordinates: 37°01′34″N 46°16′31″E
- Country: Iran
- Province: East Azerbaijan
- County: Leylan
- District: Shirin Kand
- Rural District: Leylan-e Sharqi

Population (2016)
  - Total: 466
- Time zone: UTC+3:30 (IRST)

Cheghalu (Persian: چغالو) (Note: Also romanized as Cheghālū) is a village in, and the capital of, Leylan-e Sharqi Rural District in Shirin Kand District of Leylan County, East Azerbaijan province, Iran.

== Demographics ==
=== Population ===
At the time of the 2006 National Census, the village's population was 485 in 115 households, when it was in Leylan-e Jonubi Rural District (Note: Formerly Leylan Rural District) of Leylan District (Note: Renamed the Central District of Leylan County) in Malekan County. The following census in 2011 counted 450 people in 130 households. The 2016 census measured the population of the village as 466 people in 138 households.

In 2023, the district was separated from the county in the establishment of Leylan County and renamed the Central District. Cheghalu was transferred to Leylan-e Sharqi Rural District created in the new Shirin Kand District.
