= Leylan (disambiguation) =

Leylan is a city in East Azerbaijan Province, Iran.

Leylan (Persian: ليلان) may also refer to various places in Iran:

- Leylan, Hamadan
- Leylan, alternate name of Lilas, Hamadan Province
- Leylan, Markazi
- Leylan, Zanjan
- Leylan District, in East Azerbaijan Province
- Leylan-e Jonubi Rural District, in East Azerbaijan Province
- Leylan-e Shomali Rural District, in East Azerbaijan Province

Leylan can also refer to places outside of Iran:

- Leylan Subdistrict in Iraq
