= Dash Bolagh, Malekan =

Village in East Azerbaijan province, Iran

Dash Bolagh Persian: داشبلاغ
- Village
- Location within Iran
- Coordinates: 37°07′37″N 46°15′19″E
- Country: Iran
- Province: East Azerbaijan
- County: Malekan
- District: Aq Manar
- Rural District: Gavdul-e Jonubi

Population (2016)
  - Total: 184
- Time zone: UTC+3:30 (IRST)

Dash Bolagh (Persian: داشبلاغ) (Note: Also romanized as Dāsh Bolāgh) is a village in Gavdul-e Jonubi Rural District of Aq Manar District in Malekan County, East Azerbaijan province, Iran.

== Demographics ==
=== Population ===
At the time of the 2006 National Census, the village's population was 179 in 44 households, when it was in Gavdul-e Sharqi Rural District of the Central District. The following census in 2011 counted 192 people in 55 households. The 2016 census measured the population of the village as 184 people in 57 households.

In 2023, the rural district was separated from the district in the formation of Aq Manar District, and Dash Bolagh was transferred to Gavdul-e Jonubi Rural District created in the new district.
