= Quzlu, Leylan =

Village in East Azerbaijan province, Iran

Quzlu Persian: قوزلو
- Village
- Location within Iran
- Coordinates: 37°05′36″N 46°24′25″E
- Country: Iran
- Province: East Azerbaijan
- County: Leylan
- District: Shirin Kand
- Rural District: Leylan-e Shomali

Population (2016)
  - Total: 420
- Time zone: UTC+3:30 (IRST)

Quzlu (Persian: قوزلو) (Note: Also romanized as Qūzlū) is a village in Leylan-e Shomali Rural District of Shirin Kand District in Leylan County, East Azerbaijan province, Iran.

== Demographics ==
=== Population ===
At the time of the 2006 National Census, the village's population was 333 in 67 households, when it was in Leylan District (Note: Renamed the Central District of Leylan County) of Malekan County. The following census in 2011 counted 482 people in 128 households. The 2016 census measured the population of the village as 420 people in 138 households.

In 2023, the district was separated from the county in the establishment of Leylan County and renamed the Central District. The rural district was transferred to the new Shirin Kand District.
