= Qush Qayeh =

Village in East Azerbaijan province, Iran

Qush Qayeh Persian: قوش قيه
- Village
- Location within Iran
- Coordinates: 37°06′18″N 46°20′29″E
- Country: Iran
- Province: East Azerbaijan
- County: Leylan
- District: Shirin Kand
- Rural District: Leylan-e Shomali

Population (2016)
  - Total: 940
- Time zone: UTC+3:30 (IRST)

Qush Qayeh (Persian: قوش قيه) (Note: Also romanized as Qūsh Qayeh; also known as Qūsh Qayehsī) is a village in Leylan-e Shomali Rural District of Shirin Kand District in Leylan County, East Azerbaijan province, Iran.

== Demographics ==
=== Population ===
At the time of the 2006 National Census, the village's population was 835 in 177 households, when it was in Leylan District (Note: Renamed the Central District of Leylan County) of Malekan County. The following census in 2011 counted 991 people in 251 households. The 2016 census measured the population of the village as 940 people in 265 households. It was the most populous village in its rural district.

In 2023, the district was separated from the county in the establishment of Leylan County and renamed the Central District. The rural district was transferred to the new Shirin Kand District.
