= Tazeh Kand-e Hurilar =

Village in East Azerbaijan province, Iran

Tazeh Kand-e Hurilar Persian: تازه كندحوريلر
- Village
- Location within Iran
- Coordinates: 37°03′32″N 46°17′52″E
- Country: Iran
- Province: East Azerbaijan
- County: Leylan
- District: Shirin Kand
- Rural District: Leylan-e Shomali

Population (2016)
  - Total: 379
- Time zone: UTC+3:30 (IRST)

Tazeh Kand-e Hurilar (Persian: تازه كندحوريلر) (Note: Also romanized as Tāzeh Kand-e Ḩūrīlar and Tāzehkand-e Ḩowreylar; also known as Tāzeh Kand-e Khowreylar and Tāzeh Kand-e Khvorīlar) is a village in Leylan-e Shomali Rural District of Shirin Kand District in Leylan County, East Azerbaijan province, Iran.

== Demographics ==
=== Population ===
At the time of the 2006 National Census, the village's population was 392 in 91 households, when it was in Leylan District (Note: Renamed the Central District of Leylan County) of Malekan County. The following census in 2011 counted 468 people in 98 households. The 2016 census measured the population of the village as 379 people in 114 households.

In 2023, the district was separated from the county in the establishment of Leylan County and renamed the Central District. The rural district was transferred to the new Shirin Kand District.
