= Qareh Khezer, East Azerbaijan =

Village in East Azerbaijan province, Iran

Qareh Khezer Persian: قره خضر
- Village
- Location within Iran
- Coordinates: 37°01′42″N 46°10′03″E
- Country: Iran
- Province: East Azerbaijan
- County: Leylan
- District: Central
- Rural District: Leylan-e Gharbi

Population (2016)
  - Total: 1,813
- Time zone: UTC+3:30 (IRST)

Qareh Khezer (Persian: قره خضر) (Note: Also romanized as Qareh Kheẕer) is a village in, and the capital of, Leylan-e Gharbi Rural District in the Central District (Note: Formerly Leylan District of Malekan County) of Leylan County, East Azerbaijan province, Iran.

== Demographics ==
=== Population ===
At the time of the 2006 National Census, the village's population was 1,680 in 384 households, when it was in Leylan-e Jonubi Rural District (Note: Formerly Leylan Rural District) of Leylan District (Note: Renamed the Central District of Leylan County) in Malekan County. The following census in 2011 counted 1,390 people in 382 households. The 2016 census measured the population of the village as 1,813 people in 565 households.

In 2023, the district was separated from the county in the establishment of Leylan County and renamed the Central District. Qareh Khezer was transferred to Leylan-e Gharbi Rural District created in the same district.
