= Abdolabad, East Azerbaijan =

Village in East Azerbaijan province, Iran

Abdolabad Persian: عبدل‌آباد
- Village
- Location within Iran
- Coordinates: 37°03′39″N 46°14′05″E
- Country: Iran
- Province: East Azerbaijan
- County: Leylan
- District: Central
- Rural District: Leylan-e Gharbi

Population (2016)
  - Total: 158
- Time zone: UTC+3:30 (IRST)

Abdolabad (Persian: عبدل‌آباد) (Note: Also romanized as ‘Abdolābād) is a village in Leylan-e Gharbi Rural District of the Central District (Note: Formerly Leylan District of Malekan County) in Leylan County, East Azerbaijan province, Iran.

== Demographics ==
=== Population ===
At the time of the 2006 National Census, the village's population was 202 in 46 households, when it was in Leylan-e Jonubi Rural District (Note: Formerly Leylan Rural District) of Leylan District (Note: Renamed the Central District of Leylan County) in Malekan County. The following census in 2011 counted 140 people in 42 households. The 2016 census measured the population of the village as 158 people in 54 households.

In 2023, the district was separated from the county in the establishment of Leylan County and renamed the Central District. Abdolabad was transferred to Leylan-e Gharbi Rural District created in the same district.
