= Bayram Kandi, Malekan =

Village in East Azerbaijan province, Iran

Bayram Kandi Persian: بايرام كندي
- Village
- Location within Iran
- Coordinates: 37°05′00″N 46°13′25″E
- Country: Iran
- Province: East Azerbaijan
- County: Malekan
- District: Aq Manar
- Rural District: Gavdul-e Jonubi

Population (2016)
  - Total: 371
- Time zone: UTC+3:30 (IRST)

Bayram Kandi (Persian: بايرام كندي) (Note: Also romanized as Bāyrām Kandī) is a village in Gavdul-e Jonubi Rural District of Aq Manar District in Malekan County, East Azerbaijan province, Iran.

== Demographics ==
=== Population ===
At the time of the 2006 National Census, the village's population was 354 in 59 households, when it was in Gavdul-e Sharqi Rural District of the Central District. The following census in 2011 counted 333 people in 66 households. The 2016 census measured the population of the village as 371 people in 100 households.

In 2023, the rural district was separated from the district in the formation of Aq Manar District, and Bayram Kandi was transferred to Gavdul-e Jonubi Rural District created in the new district.
