= Turaghay =

Village in East Azerbaijan province, Iran

Turaghay Persian: طوراغاي
- Village
- Location within Iran
- Coordinates: 37°05′14″N 46°18′44″E
- Country: Iran
- Province: East Azerbaijan
- County: Leylan
- District: Shirin Kand
- Rural District: Leylan-e Shomali

Population (2016)
  - Total: 718
- Time zone: UTC+3:30 (IRST)

Turaghay (Persian: طوراغاي)) (Note: Also romanized as Ţowrāghā'ī and Ţūrāghāy) is a village in, and the capital of, Leylan-e Shomali Rural District in Shirin Kand District of Leylan County, East Azerbaijan province, Iran.

== Demographics ==
=== Population ===
At the time of the 2006 National Census, the village's population was 636 in 160 households, when it was in Leylan District (Note: Renamed the Central District of Leylan County) of Malekan County. The following census in 2011 counted 695 people in 197 households. The 2016 census measured the population of the village as 718 people in 219 households.

In 2023, the district was separated from the county in the establishment of Leylan County and renamed the Central District. The rural district was transferred to the new Shirin Kand District.
