= Nosratabad, Malekan =

Village in East Azerbaijan province, Iran

Nosratabad Persian: نصرت اباد
- Village
- Location within Iran
- Coordinates: 37°06′15″N 46°12′13″E
- Country: Iran
- Province: East Azerbaijan
- County: Malekan
- District: Aq Manar
- Rural District: Gavdul-e Jonubi

Population (2016)
  - Total: 223
- Time zone: UTC+3:30 (IRST)

Nosratabad (Persian: نصرت اباد) (Note: Also romanized as Noşratābād; also known as Noşratābād-e Amīr Ghāyeb) is a village in Gavdul-e Jonubi Rural District of Aq Manar District in Malekan County, East Azerbaijan province, Iran.

== Demographics ==
=== Population ===
At the time of the 2006 National Census, the village's population was 173 in 35 households, when it was in Gavdul-e Sharqi Rural District of the Central District. The following census in 2011 counted 200 people in 59 households. The 2016 census measured the population of the village as 223 people in 69 households.

In 2023, the rural district was separated from the district in the formation of Aq Manar District, and Nosratabad was transferred to Gavdul-e Jonubi Rural District created in the new district.
