= Qorban Kandi, Malekan =

Village in East Azerbaijan province, Iran

Qorban Kandi Persian: قربان كندي
- Village
- Location within Iran
- Coordinates: 37°06′50″N 46°13′50″E
- Country: Iran
- Province: East Azerbaijan
- County: Malekan
- District: Aq Manar
- Rural District: Gavdul-e Jonubi

Population (2016)
  - Total: 437
- Time zone: UTC+3:30 (IRST)

Qorban Kandi (Persian: قربان كندي) (Note: Also romanized as Qorbān Kandī) is a village in Gavdul-e Jonubi Rural District of Aq Manar District in Malekan County, East Azerbaijan province, Iran.

== Demographics ==
=== Population ===
At the time of the 2006 National Census, the village's population was 398 in 116 households, when it was in Gavdul-e Sharqi Rural District of the Central District. The following census in 2011 counted 419 people in 115 households. The 2016 census measured the population of the village as 437 people in 124 households.

In 2023, the rural district was separated from the district in the formation of Aq Manar District, and Qorban Kandi was transferred to Gavdul-e Jonubi Rural District created in the new district.
