= Aghkand-e Qareh Khezer =

Village in East Azerbaijan province, Iran

Aghkand-e Qareh Khezer Persian: اغكندقره خضر
- Village
- Location within Iran
- Coordinates: 37°02′25″N 46°08′42″E
- Country: Iran
- Province: East Azerbaijan
- County: Leylan
- District: Central
- Rural District: Leylan-e Gharbi

Population (2016)
  - Total: 565
- Time zone: UTC+3:30 (IRST)

Aghkand-e Qareh Khezer (Persian: اغكندقره خضر) (Note: Also romanized as Āgh Kand-e Qareh Kheẕer; also known as Āqkand-e Qareh Kheẕer) is a village in Leylan-e Gharbi Rural District of the Central District (Note: Formerly Leylan District of Malekan County) in Leylan County, East Azerbaijan province, Iran.

== Demographics ==
=== Population ===
At the time of the 2006 National Census, the village's population was 540 in 129 households, when it was in Leylan-e Jonubi Rural District (Note: Formerly Leylan Rural District) of Leylan District (Note: Renamed the Central District of Leylan County) in Malekan County. The following census in 2011 counted 458 people in 122 households. The 2016 census measured the population of the village as 565 people in 170 households.

In 2023, the district was separated from the county in the establishment of Leylan County and renamed the Central District. Aghkand-e Qareh Khezer was transferred to Leylan-e Gharbi Rural District created in the same district.
