= Damirchi, Malekan =

Village in East Azerbaijan province, Iran

Damirchi Persian: دميرچي
- Village
- Location within Iran
- Coordinates: 37°05′09″N 46°11′10″E
- Country: Iran
- Province: East Azerbaijan
- County: Malekan
- District: Aq Manar
- Rural District: Gavdul-e Jonubi

Population (2016)
  - Total: 1,084
- Time zone: UTC+3:30 (IRST)

Damirchi (Persian: دميرچي) (Note: Also romanized as Damīrchī) is a village in, and the capital of, Gavdul-e Jonubi Rural District in Aq Manar District of Malekan County, East Azerbaijan province, Iran.

== Demographics ==
=== Population ===
At the time of the 2006 National Census, the village's population was 1,018 in 229 households, when it was in Gavdul-e Sharqi Rural District of the Central District. The following census in 2011 counted 1,068 people in 283 households. The 2016 census measured the population of the village as 1,084 people in 310 households.

In 2023, the rural district was separated from the district in the formation of Aq Manar District, and Damirchi was transferred to Gavdul-e Jonubi Rural District created in the new district.
