= Amir Ghayeb =

Village in East Azerbaijan province, Iran

Amir Ghayeb Persian: اميرغايب
- Village
- Location within Iran
- Coordinates: 37°06′50″N 46°12′54″E
- Country: Iran
- Province: East Azerbaijan
- County: Malekan
- District: Aq Manar
- Rural District: Gavdul-e Jonubi

Population (2016)
  - Total: 315
- Time zone: UTC+3:30 (IRST)

Amir Ghayeb (Persian: اميرغايب) (Note: Also romanized as Amīr Ghā'eb and Amīr Ghāyeb) is a village in Gavdul-e Jonubi Rural District of Aq Manar District in Malekan County, East Azerbaijan province, Iran.

== Demographics ==
=== Population ===
At the time of the 2006 National Census, the village's population was 357 in 81 households, when it was in Gavdul-e Sharqi Rural District of the Central District. The following census in 2011 counted 340 people in 89 households. The 2016 census measured the population of the village as 315 people in 95 households.

In 2023, the rural district was separated from the district in the formation of Aq Manar District, and Amir Ghayeb was transferred to Gavdul-e Jonubi Rural District created in the new district.
