= Shirinabad =

Shirinabad (Persian: شيرين اباد) may refer to:

- Shirinabad, East Azerbaijan
- Shirinabad, Golestan
- Shirinabad, Hamadan
- Shirinabad, Malayer, Hamadan Province
- Shirinabad, Ilam
- Shirinabad, Kerman
- Shirinabad, Kermanshah
- Shirinabad, Markazi
- Shirinabad, Razavi Khorasan
