= Qandhar =

Village in East Azerbaijan province, Iran

Qandhar Persian: قندهار
- Village
- Location within Iran
- Coordinates: 37°02′08″N 46°11′22″E
- Country: Iran
- Province: East Azerbaijan
- County: Leylan
- District: Central
- Rural District: Leylan-e Gharbi

Population (2016)
  - Total: 1,436
- Time zone: UTC+3:30 (IRST)

Qandhar (Persian: قندهار) (Note: Also romanized as Qandhār) is a village in Leylan-e Gharbi Rural District of the Central District (Note: Formerly Leylan District of Malekan County) in Leylan County, East Azerbaijan province, Iran.

== Demographics ==
=== Population ===
At the time of the 2006 National Census, the village's population was 1,176 in 237 households, when it was in Leylan-e Jonubi Rural District (Note: Formerly Leylan Rural District) of Leylan District (Note: Renamed the Central District of Leylan County) in Malekan County. The following census in 2011 counted 1,161 people in 315 households. The 2016 census measured the population of the village as 1,436 people in 410 households.

In 2023, the district was separated from the county in the establishment of Leylan County and renamed the Central District. Qandhar was transferred to Leylan-e Gharbi Rural District created in the same district.
