= Qashaqchi =

Village in East Azerbaijan province, Iran

Qashaqchi Persian: قاشقچي
- Village
- Location within Iran
- Coordinates: 37°02′48″N 46°17′51″E
- Country: Iran
- Province: East Azerbaijan
- County: Leylan
- District: Shirin Kand
- Rural District: Leylan-e Shomali

Population (2016)
  - Total: 367
- Time zone: UTC+3:30 (IRST)

Qashaqchi (Persian: قاشقچي) (Note: Also romanized as Qāshaqchī; also known as Qāshūqchī) is a village in Leylan-e Shomali Rural District of Shirin Kand District in Leylan County, East Azerbaijan province, Iran.

== Demographics ==
=== Population ===
At the time of the 2006 National Census, the village's population was 399 in 99 households, when it was in Leylan District (Note: Renamed the Central District of Leylan County) of Malekan County. The following census in 2011 counted 388 people in 106 households. The 2016 census measured the population of the village as 367 people in 113 households.

In 2023, the district was separated from the county in the establishment of Leylan County and renamed the Central District. The rural district was transferred to the new Shirin Kand District.
