= Shariflu =

Village in East Azerbaijan province, Iran

Shariflu Persian: شريفلو
- Village
- Location within Iran
- Coordinates: 36°57′58″N 46°11′31″E
- Country: Iran
- Province: East Azerbaijan
- County: Leylan
- District: Central
- Rural District: Leylan-e Jonubi

Population (2016)
  - Total: 1,024
- Time zone: UTC+3:30 (IRST)

Shariflu (Persian: شريفلو) (Note: Also romanized as Sharīflū) is a village in Leylan-e Jonubi Rural District (Note: Formerly Leylan Rural District) of the Central District (Note: Formerly Leylan District of Malekan County) in Leylan County, East Azerbaijan province, Iran.

== Demographics ==
=== Population ===
At the time of the 2006 National Census, the village's population was 963 in 234 households, when it was in Leylan District (Note: Renamed the Central District of Leylan County) of Malekan County. The following census in 2011 counted 1,073 people in 310 households. The 2016 census measured the population of the village as 1,024 people in 303 households.

In 2023, the district was separated from the county in the establishment of Leylan County and renamed the Central District.
