= Banayem =

Village in East Azerbaijan province, Iran

Banayem Persian: بنايم
- Village
- Location within Iran
- Coordinates: 37°08′18″N 46°16′49″E
- Country: Iran
- Province: East Azerbaijan
- County: Malekan
- District: Aq Manar
- Rural District: Gavdul-e Sharqi

Population (2016)
  - Total: 292
- Time zone: UTC+3:30 (IRST)

Banayem (Persian: بنايم) (Note: Also romanized as Banāyem; also known as Banā'em) is a village in Gavdul-e Sharqi Rural District of Aq Manar District in Malekan County, East Azerbaijan province, Iran.

== Demographics ==
=== Population ===
At the time of the 2006 National Census, the village's population was 309 in 81 households, when it was in the Central District. The following census in 2011 counted 305 people in 84 households. The 2016 census measured the population of the village as 292 people in 96 households.

In 2023, the rural district was separated from the district in the formation of Aq Manar District.
