= Turchi =

Village in East Azerbaijan province, Iran

Turchi Persian: تورچي
- Village
- Location within Iran
- Coordinates: 36°59′07″N 46°11′55″E
- Country: Iran
- Province: East Azerbaijan
- County: Leylan
- District: Central
- Rural District: Leylan-e Jonubi

Population (2016)
  - Total: 1,556
- Time zone: UTC+3:30 (IRST)

Turchi (Persian: تورچي) (Note: Also romanized as Tūrchī) is a village in, and the capital of, Leylan-e Jonubi Rural District (Note: Formerly Leylan Rural District) in the Central District (Note: Formerly Leylan District of Malekan County) of Leylan County, East Azerbaijan province, Iran. The rural district was previously administered from the city of Leylan.

== Demographics ==
=== Population ===
At the time of the 2006 National Census, the village's population was 1,493 in 290 households, when it was in Leylan District (Note: Renamed the Central District of Leylan County) of Malekan County. The following census in 2011 counted 1,657 people in 413 households. The 2016 census measured the population of the village as 1,556 people in 433 households.

In 2023, the district was separated from the county in the establishment of Leylan County and renamed the Central District.
