= Baba Kalak =

Village in East Azerbaijan province, Iran

Baba Kalak Persian: باباكلك
- Village
- Location within Iran
- Coordinates: 37°11′10″N 46°20′42″E
- Country: Iran
- Province: East Azerbaijan
- County: Malekan
- District: Aq Manar
- Rural District: Gavdul-e Sharqi

Population (2016)
  - Total: 427
- Time zone: UTC+3:30 (IRST)

Baba Kalak (Persian: باباكلك) (Note: Also romanized as Bābā Kalak) is a village in Gavdul-e Sharqi Rural District of Aq Manar District in Malekan County, East Azerbaijan province, Iran.

== Demographics ==
=== Population ===
At the time of the 2006 National Census, the village's population was 440 in 93 households, when it was in the Central District. The following census in 2011 counted 377 people in 93 households. The 2016 census measured the population of the village as 427 people in 139 households.

In 2023, the rural district was separated from the district in the formation of Aq Manar District.
