= Quzuchi Avin =

Village in East Azerbaijan province, Iran

Quzuchi Avin Persian: قوزوچي اوين
- Village
- Location within Iran
- Coordinates: 37°09′29″N 46°16′20″E
- Country: Iran
- Province: East Azerbaijan
- County: Malekan
- District: Aq Manar
- Rural District: Gavdul-e Sharqi

Population (2016)
  - Total: 386
- Time zone: UTC+3:30 (IRST)

Quzuchi Avin (Persian: قوزوچي اوين) (Note: Also romanized as Qūzūchī Avīn; also known as Qūzūchī Owlan (قوزوچي يولن)) is a village in Gavdul-e Sharqi Rural District of Aq Manar District in Malekan County, East Azerbaijan province, Iran.

== Demographics ==
=== Population ===
At the time of the 2006 National Census, the village's population was 353 in 93 households, when it was in the Central District. The following census in 2011 counted 363 people in 93 households. The 2016 census measured the population of the village as 386 people in 120 households.

In 2023, the rural district was separated from the district in the formation of Aq Manar District.
