= Shurjeh-ye Turaghay =

Shurjeh-ye Turaghay شورجه طوراغاي
- Village
- Location within Iran
- Coordinates: 37°07′15″N 46°18′21″E
- Country: Iran
- Province: East Azerbaijan
- County: Malekan
- Bakhsh: Leylan
- Rural District: Leylan-e Shomali

Population (2006)
  - Total: 308
- Time zone: UTC+3:30 (IRST)
  - Summer (DST): UTC+4:30 (IRDT)

Shurjeh-ye Turaghay (Persian: شورجه طوراغاي, also Romanized as Shūrjeh-ye Ţūrāghāy and Shūrjeh-ye Ţūrāghā'ī) is a village in Leylan-e Shomali Rural District, Leylan District, Malekan County, East Azerbaijan Province, Iran. As of the 2006 census, its population was 308, in 65 families.
