= Mohsenabad, Leylan =

Village in East Azerbaijan province, Iran

Mohsenabad Persian: محسن اباد
- Village
- Location within Iran
- Country: Iran
- Province: East Azerbaijan
- County: Leylan
- District: Central
- Rural District: Leylan-e Jonubi

Population (2016)
  - Total: 1,044
- Time zone: UTC+3:30 (IRST)

Mohsenabad (Persian: محسن اباد) (Note: Also romanized as Moḩsenābād) is a village in Leylan-e Jonubi Rural District (Note: Formerly Leylan Rural District) of the Central District (Note: Formerly Leylan District of Malekan County) in Leylan County, East Azerbaijan province, Iran.

== Demographics ==
=== Population ===
At the time of the 2006 National Census, the village's population was 990 in 206 households, when it was in Leylan District (Note: Renamed the Central District of Leylan County) of Malekan County. The following census in 2011 counted 1,057 people in 262 households. The 2016 census measured the population of the village as 1,044 people in 281 households.

In 2023, the district was separated from the county in the establishment of Leylan County and renamed the Central District.
