= Shirin Kand =

Shirin Kand (Persian: شيرين كند) may refer to:

- Shirin Kand, Leylan
- Shirin Kand, Maragheh
- Shirin Kand District, an administrative division of Leylan County, East Azerbaijan province, Iran
