= Sharazul =

Sharazul شرازول
- Village
- Location within Iran
- Coordinates: 37°09′13″N 46°05′11″E
- Country: Iran
- Province: East Azerbaijan
- County: Malekan
- Bakhsh: Central
- Rural District: Gavdul-e Gharbi

Population (2006)
  - Total: 217
- Time zone: UTC+3:30 (IRST)
  - Summer (DST): UTC+4:30 (IRDT)

Sharazul (Persian: شرازول, also Romanized as Sharāzūl) is a village in Gavdul-e Gharbi Rural District, in the Central District of Malekan County, East Azerbaijan Province, Iran. At the 2006 census, its population was 217, in 47 families.
