= Parchin Bolagh =

Village in East Azerbaijan province, Iran

Parchin Bolagh Persian: پرچين بلاغ
- Village
- Location within Iran
- Coordinates: 37°13′17″N 46°17′28″E
- Country: Iran
- Province: East Azerbaijan
- County: Malekan
- District: Aq Manar
- Rural District: Gavdul-e Sharqi

Population (2016)
  - Total: 264
- Time zone: UTC+3:30 (IRST)

Parchin Bolagh (Persian: پرچين بلاغ) (Note: Also romanized as Parchīn Bolāgh) is a village in Gavdul-e Sharqi Rural District of Aq Manar District in Malekan County, East Azerbaijan province, Iran.

== Demographics ==
=== Population ===
At the time of the 2006 National Census, the village's population was 261 in 62 households, when it was in the Central District. The following census in 2011 counted 261 people in 63 households. The 2016 census measured the population of the village as 264 people in 80 households.

In 2023, the rural district was separated from the district in the formation of Aq Manar District.
