= Godaklu, East Azerbaijan =

Village in East Azerbaijan province, Iran

Godaklu Persian: گدكلو
- Village
- Location within Iran
- Coordinates: 37°00′55″N 46°10′24″E
- Country: Iran
- Province: East Azerbaijan
- County: Leylan
- District: Central
- Rural District: Leylan-e Gharbi

Population (2016)
  - Total: 1,481
- Time zone: UTC+3:30 (IRST)

Godaklu (Persian: گدكلو) (Note: Also romanized as Godaklū) is a village in Leylan-e Gharbi Rural District of the Central District (Note: Formerly Leylan District of Malekan County) in Leylan County, East Azerbaijan province, Iran.

== Demographics ==
=== Population ===
At the time of the 2006 National Census, the village's population was 1,291 in 285 households, when it was in Leylan-e Jonubi Rural District (Note: Formerly Leylan Rural District) of Leylan District (Note: Renamed the Central District of Leylan County) in Malekan County. The following census in 2011 counted 1,330 people in 373 households. The 2016 census measured the population of the village as 1,481 people in 440 households.

In 2023, the district was separated from the county in the establishment of Leylan County and renamed the Central District. Godaklu was transferred to Leylan-e Gharbi Rural District created in the same district.
