= Arpa Darrehsi, Leylan =

Village in East Azerbaijan province, Iran

Arpa Darrehsi Persian: آرپادره سي
- Village
- Location within Iran
- Coordinates: 37°04′30″N 46°23′48″E
- Country: Iran
- Province: East Azerbaijan
- County: Leylan
- District: Shirin Kand
- Rural District: Leylan-e Shomali

Population (2016)
  - Total: 426
- Time zone: UTC+3:30 (IRST)

Arpa Darrehsi (Persian: آرپادره سي) (Note: Also romanized as Ārpā Darrehsī) is a village in Leylan-e Shomali Rural District of Shirin Kand District in Leylan County, East Azerbaijan province, Iran.

== Demographics ==
=== Population ===
At the time of the 2006 National Census, the village's population was 394 in 72 households, when it was in Leylan District (Note: Renamed the Central District of Leylan County) of Malekan County. The following census in 2011 counted 402 people in 101 households. The 2016 census measured the population of the village as 426 people in 117 households.

In 2023, the district was separated from the county in the establishment of Leylan County and renamed the Central District. The rural district was transferred to the new Shirin Kand District.
