= Shirin Kand, Leylan =

Village in East Azerbaijan province, Iran

Shirin Kand Persian: شيرين كند
- Village
- Location within Iran
- Coordinates: 37°00′07″N 46°16′11″E
- Country: Iran
- Province: East Azerbaijan
- County: Leylan
- District: Shirin Kand
- Rural District: Leylan-e Sharqi

Population (2016)
  - Total: 2,744
- Time zone: UTC+3:30 (IRST)

Shirin Kand (Persian: شيرين كند) (Note: Also romanized as Shīrīn Kand) is a village in Leylan-e Sharqi Rural District of Shirin Kand District in Leylan County, East Azerbaijan province, Iran, serving as capital of the district.

== Demographics ==
=== Population ===
At the time of the 2006 National Census, the village's population was 2,379 in 581 households, when it was in Leylan-e Jonubi Rural District (Note: Formerly Leylan Rural District) of Leylan District (Note: Renamed the Central District of Leylan County) in Malekan County. The following census in 2011 counted 2,627 people in 727 households. The 2016 census measured the population of the village as 2,744 people in 815 households. It was the most populous village in its rural district.

In 2023, the district was separated from the county in the establishment of Leylan County and renamed the Central District. Shirin Kand was transferred to Leylan-e Sharqi Rural District created in the new Shirin Kand District.
