= Qareh Chenaq, East Azerbaijan =

Village in East Azerbaijan province, Iran

Qareh Chenaq Persian: قره چناق
- Village
- Location within Iran
- Coordinates: 37°09′05″N 46°12′52″E
- Country: Iran
- Province: East Azerbaijan
- County: Malekan
- District: Aq Manar
- Rural District: Gavdul-e Sharqi

Population (2016)
  - Total: 390
- Time zone: UTC+3:30 (IRST)

Qareh Chenaq (Persian: قره چناق) (Note: Also romanized as Qareh Chenāq) is a village in Gavdul-e Sharqi Rural District of Aq Manar District in Malekan County, East Azerbaijan province, Iran.

== Demographics ==
=== Population ===
At the time of the 2006 National Census, the village's population was 454 in 112 households, when it was in the Central District. The following census in 2011 counted 444 people in 129 households. The 2016 census measured the population of the village as 390 people in 126 households.

In 2023, the rural district was separated from the district in the formation of Aq Manar District.
