= Owch Bolagh =

Owch Bolagh or Owchbolagh or Uch Bolagh or Uchbolagh (Persian: اوچ بلاغ), also rendered as Auch Bulaq or Uchbulak, may refer to various places in Iran:

- Owch Bolagh, Bileh Savar, Ardabil Province
- Owch Bolagh, Germi, Ardabil Province
- Owch Bolagh, Kowsar, Ardabil Province
- Owch Bolagh, Namin, Ardabil Province
- Owch Bolagh, East Azerbaijan
- Owchbolagh, East Azerbaijan
- Owch Bolagh, Kurdistan
- Owch Bolagh, Zanjan
- Owch Bolagh, Khodabandeh, Zanjan Province
