= Hasanabad, Leylan =

Village in East Azerbaijan province, Iran

Hasanabad Persian: حسن اباد
- Village
- Location within Iran
- Country: Iran
- Province: East Azerbaijan
- County: Leylan
- District: Central
- Rural District: Leylan-e Jonubi

Population (2016)
  - Total: 1,144
- Time zone: UTC+3:30 (IRST)

Hasanabad (Persian: حسن اباد) (Note: Also romanized as Ḩasanābād; also known as Ḩasanābād-e Leylān) is a village in Leylan-e Jonubi Rural District (Note: Formerly Leylan Rural District) of the Central District (Note: Formerly Leylan District of Malekan County) in Leylan County, East Azerbaijan province, Iran.

== Demographics ==
=== Population ===
At the time of the 2006 National Census, the village's population was 974 in 239 households, when it was in Leylan District (Note: Renamed the Central District of Leylan County) of Malekan County. The following census in 2011 counted 1,046 people in 300 households. The 2016 census measured the population of the village as 1,144 people in 341 households.

In 2023, the district was separated from the county in the establishment of Leylan County and renamed the Central District.
