= Leyli Daghi =

Leyli Daghi ليلي داغي
- Village
- Location within Iran
- Coordinates: 37°15′47″N 46°16′41″E
- Country: Iran
- Province: East Azerbaijan
- County: Malekan
- Bakhsh: Central
- Rural District: Gavdul-e Sharqi

Population (2006)
  - Total: 60
- Time zone: UTC+3:30 (IRST)
  - Summer (DST): UTC+4:30 (IRDT)

Leyli Daghi (Persian: ليلي داغي, also Romanized as Leylī Dāghī) is a village in Gavdul-e Sharqi Rural District, in the Central District of Malekan County, East Azerbaijan Province, Iran. At the 2006 census, its population was 60, in 12 families.
