= Hapik Bolaghi =

Village in East Azerbaijan province, Iran

Hapik Bolaghi Persian: هپيك بلاغي
- Village
- Location within Iran
- Coordinates: 37°08′46″N 46°20′22″E
- Country: Iran
- Province: East Azerbaijan
- County: Malekan
- District: Aq Manar
- Rural District: Gavdul-e Sharqi

Population (2016)
  - Total: 339
- Time zone: UTC+3:30 (IRST)

Hapik Bolaghi (Persian: هپيك بلاغي) (Note: Also romanized as Hapīk Bolāghī; also known as Hāpī, Hapi Bolagh (هپي بلاغ), Hapī Bolāghī, and Hapībolāghī) is a village in Gavdul-e Sharqi Rural District of Aq Manar District in Malekan County, East Azerbaijan province, Iran.

== Demographics ==
=== Population ===
At the time of the 2006 National Census, the village's population was 269 in 64 households, when it was in the Central District. The following census in 2011 counted 287 people in 84 households. The 2016 census measured the population of the village as 339 people in 107 households.

In 2023, the rural district was separated from the district in the formation of Aq Manar District.
