= Baba Qazi =

Baba Qazi باباقاضي
- Village
- Location within Iran
- Coordinates: 37°07′24″N 46°22′50″E
- Country: Iran
- Province: East Azerbaijan
- County: Malekan
- Bakhsh: Leylan
- Rural District: Leylan-e Shomali

Population (2006)
  - Total: 94
- Time zone: UTC+3:30 (IRST)
  - Summer (DST): UTC+4:30 (IRDT)

Baba Qazi (Persian: باباقاضي, also Romanized as Bābā Qāẕī) is a village in Leylan-e Shomali Rural District, Leylan District, Malekan County, East Azerbaijan Province, Iran. At the 2006 census, its population was 94, in 18 families.
