= Hurilar =

Hurilar حوري لر
- Village
- Location within Iran
- Coordinates: 37°03′45″N 46°18′21″E
- Country: Iran
- Province: East Azerbaijan
- County: Malekan
- Bakhsh: Leylan
- Rural District: Leylan-e Shomali

Population (2006)
  - Total: 265
- Time zone: UTC+3:30 (IRST)
  - Summer (DST): UTC+4:30 (IRDT)

Hurilar (Persian: حوري لر, also Romanized as Ḩūrīlar; also known as Khūrīlar and Khvorīlar) is a village in Leylan-e Shomali Rural District, Leylan District, Malekan County, East Azerbaijan Province, Iran. At the 2006 census, its population was 265, in 69 families.
