= Qurijan =

Village in East Azerbaijan province, Iran

Qurijan Persian: قوريجان
- Village
- Location within Iran
- Coordinates: 37°10′25″N 46°07′49″E
- Country: Iran
- Province: East Azerbaijan
- County: Malekan
- District: Central
- Rural District: Gavdul-e Markazi

Population (2016)
  - Total: 2,371
- Time zone: UTC+3:30 (IRST)

Qurijan (Persian: قوريجان) (Note: Also romanized as Qūrījān) is a village in Gavdul-e Markazi Rural District of the Central District in Malekan County, East Azerbaijan province, Iran.

== Demographics ==
=== Population ===
At the time of the 2006 National Census, the village's population was 2,378 in 611 households. The following census in 2011 counted 2,553 people in 726 households. The 2016 census measured the population of the village as 2,371 people in 722 households.
