= Qareh Chal =

Village in East Azerbaijan province, Iran

Qareh Chal Persian: قره چال
- Village
- Location within Iran
- Coordinates: 37°07′12″N 46°07′33″E
- Country: Iran
- Province: East Azerbaijan
- County: Malekan
- District: Central
- Rural District: Gavdul-e Markazi

Population (2016)
  - Total: 2,391
- Time zone: UTC+3:30 (IRST)

Qareh Chal (Persian: قره چال) (Note: Also romanized as Qareh Chāl) is a village in Gavdul-e Markazi Rural District of the Central District in Malekan County, East Azerbaijan province, Iran.

== Demographics ==
=== Population ===
At the time of the 2006 National Census, the village's population was 2,234 in 517 households. The following census in 2011 counted 2,441 people in 668 households. The 2016 census measured the population of the village as 2,391 people in 735 households.
