= Aliabad-e Qeshlaq =

Village in East Azerbaijan province, Iran

Aliabad-e Qeshlaq Persian: علی‌آباد قشلاق
- Village
- Location within Iran
- Coordinates: 37°13′54″N 46°04′07″E
- Country: Iran
- Province: East Azerbaijan
- County: Malekan
- District: Central
- Rural District: Gavdul-e Markazi

Population (2016)
  - Total: 1,118
- Time zone: UTC+3:30 (IRST)

Aliabad-e Qeshlaq (Persian: علی‌آباد قشلاق) (Note: Also romanized as ‘Alīābād-e Qeshlāq; formerly known as Qeshlāq-e Gūrān (قشلاق گوران)) is a village in Gavdul-e Markazi Rural District of the Central District in Malekan County, East Azerbaijan province, Iran.

== Demographics ==
=== Population ===
At the time of the 2006 National Census, the village's population was 981 in 259 households. The following census in 2011 counted 1,128 people in 303 households. The 2016 census measured the population of the village as 1,118 people in 318 households.
