= Qoli Kandi =

Qoli Kandi (Persian: قلي كندي) may refer to:

- Qoli Kandi, Charuymaq, East Azerbaijan Province
- Qoli Kandi, Malekan, East Azerbaijan Province
- Qoli Kandi, Hamadan
- Qoli Kandi, Zanjan
