= Salarabad, East Azerbaijan =

Salarabad سالاراباد
- Village
- Location within Iran
- Coordinates: 37°10′38″N 45°58′37″E
- Country: Iran
- Province: East Azerbaijan
- County: Malekan
- Bakhsh: Central
- Rural District: Gavdul-e Gharbi

Population (2006)
  - Total: 82
- Time zone: UTC+3:30 (IRST)
  - Summer (DST): UTC+4:30 (IRDT)

Salarabad (Persian: سالاراباد, also Romanized as Sālārābād) is a village in Gavdul-e Gharbi Rural District, in the Central District of Malekan County, East Azerbaijan Province, Iran. At the 2006 census, its population was 82, in 25 families.
