= Tazeh Qaleh, East Azerbaijan =

Village in East Azerbaijan province, Iran

Tazeh Qaleh Persian: تازه قلعه
- Village
- Location within Iran
- Coordinates: 37°08′03″N 46°04′00″E
- Country: Iran
- Province: East Azerbaijan
- County: Malekan
- District: Central
- Rural District: Gavdul-e Gharbi

Population (2016)
  - Total: 4,058
- Time zone: UTC+3:30 (IRST)

Tazeh Qaleh (Persian: تازه قلعه) (Note: Also romanized as Tāzeh Qal'eh) is a village in Gavdul-e Gharbi Rural District of the Central District in Malekan County, East Azerbaijan province, Iran.

== Demographics ==
=== Population ===
At the time of the 2006 National Census, the village's population was 3,691 in 1,035 households. The following census in 2011 counted 3,827 people in 1,113 households. The 2016 census measured the population of the village as 4,058 people in 1,340 households. It was the most populous village in its rural district.
