= Idahluy-e Bozorg =

Village in East Azerbaijan province, Iran

Idahluy-e Bozorg Persian: ايده لوي بزرگ
- Village
- Location within Iran
- Coordinates: 37°09′36″N 46°18′46″E
- Country: Iran
- Province: East Azerbaijan
- County: Malekan
- District: Aq Manar
- Rural District: Gavdul-e Sharqi

Population (2016)
  - Total: 532
- Time zone: UTC+3:30 (IRST)

Idahluy-e Bozorg (Persian: ايده لوي بزرگ) (Note: Also romanized as Īdahlūy-e Bozorg; also known as Īdahlū-ye Bozorg) is a village in, and the capital of, Gavdul-e Sharqi Rural District in Aq Manar District of Malekan County, East Azerbaijan province, Iran. The previous capital of the rural district was the village of Aq Manar.

== Demographics ==
=== Population ===
At the time of the 2006 National Census, the village's population was 458 in 131 households, when it was in the Central District. The following census in 2011 counted 568 people in 175 households. The 2016 census measured the population of the village as 532 people in 160 households.

In 2023, the rural district was separated from the district in the formation of Aq Manar District.
