= Tazeh Kand-e Sheykh ol Eslam =

Tazeh Kand-e Sheykh ol Eslam تازه كندشيخ الاسلام
- Village
- Location within Iran
- Coordinates: 37°13′58″N 46°11′38″E
- Country: Iran
- Province: East Azerbaijan
- County: Malekan
- Bakhsh: Central
- Rural District: Gavdul-e Markazi

Population (2006)
  - Total: 149
- Time zone: UTC+3:30 (IRST)
  - Summer (DST): UTC+4:30 (IRDT)

Tazeh Kand-e Sheykh ol Eslam (Persian: تازه كندشيخ الاسلام, also Romanized as Tāzeh Kand-e Sheykh ol Eslām; also known as Shīrīnābād) is a village in Gavdul-e Markazi Rural District, in the Central District of Malekan County, East Azerbaijan Province, Iran. At the 2006 census, its population was 149, in 38 families.
