= Mehmandar-e Sofla =

Village in East Azerbaijan province, Iran

Mehmandar-e Sofla Persian: مهماندارسفلي
- Village
- Location within Iran
- Country: Iran
- Province: East Azerbaijan
- County: Malekan
- District: Central
- Rural District: Gavdul-e Markazi

Population (2016)
  - Total: 1,008
- Time zone: UTC+3:30 (IRST)

Mehmandar-e Sofla (Persian: مهماندارسفلي) (Note: Also romanized as Mehmāndār-e Soflá; also known as Mehmāndār-e Pā’īn) is a village in Gavdul-e Markazi Rural District of the Central District in Malekan County, East Azerbaijan province, Iran.

== Demographics ==
=== Population ===
At the time of the 2006 National Census, the village's population was 940 in 201 households. The following census in 2011 counted 998 people in 266 households. The 2016 census measured the population of the village as 1,008 people in 292 households.
