= Sormahlu =

Village in East Azerbaijan province, Iran

Sormahlu Persian: سرمه لو
- Village
- Location within Iran
- Coordinates: 37°06′43″N 46°03′09″E
- Country: Iran
- Province: East Azerbaijan
- County: Malekan
- District: Central
- Rural District: Gavdul-e Gharbi

Population (2016)
  - Total: 618
- Time zone: UTC+3:30 (IRST)

Sormahlu (Persian: سرمه لو) (Note: Also romanized as Sormahlū; also known as Sormalū) is a village in Gavdul-e Gharbi Rural District of the Central District in Malekan County, East Azerbaijan province, Iran.

== Demographics ==
=== Population ===
At the time of the 2006 National Census, the village's population was 595 in 137 households. The following census in 2011 counted 600 people in 158 households. The 2016 census measured the population of the village as 618 people in 158 households.
