= Aruq =

Village in East Azerbaijan province, Iran

Aruq Persian: اروق
- Village
- Location within Iran
- Coordinates: 37°08′07″N 46°08′39″E
- Country: Iran
- Province: East Azerbaijan
- County: Malekan
- District: Central
- Rural District: Gavdul-e Markazi

Population (2016)
  - Total: 4,462
- Time zone: UTC+3:30 (IRST)

Aruq (Persian: اروق) (Note: Also romanized as Ārūq) is a village in, and the capital of, Gavdul-e Markazi Rural District in the Central District of Malekan County, East Azerbaijan province, Iran.

== Demographics ==
=== Population ===
At the time of the 2006 National Census, the village's population was 3,566 in 902 households. The following census in 2011 counted 3,904 people in 1,149 households. The 2016 census measured the population of the village as 4,462 people in 1,288 households.
