= Sheykh ol Eslam, Malekan =

Sheykh ol Eslam شيخ الاسلام
- Village
- Location within Iran
- Coordinates: 37°13′15″N 46°11′15″E
- Country: Iran
- Province: East Azerbaijan
- County: Malekan
- Bakhsh: Central
- Rural District: Gavdul-e Markazi

Population (2006)
  - Total: 374
- Time zone: UTC+3:30 (IRST)
  - Summer (DST): UTC+4:30 (IRDT)

Sheykh ol Eslam (Persian: شيخ الاسلام, also Romanized as Sheykh ol Eslām) is a village in Gavdul-e Markazi Rural District, in the Central District of Malekan County, East Azerbaijan Province, Iran. At the 2006 census, its population was 374, in 114 families.
