= Ahmadabad, Malekan =

Village in East Azerbaijan province, Iran

Ahmadabad Persian: احمداباد
- Village
- Location within Iran
- Coordinates: 37°10′45″N 45°59′29″E
- Country: Iran
- Province: East Azerbaijan
- County: Malekan
- District: Central
- Rural District: Gavdul-e Gharbi

Population (2016)
  - Total: 546
- Time zone: UTC+3:30 (IRST)

Ahmadabad (Persian: احمداباد) (Note: Also romanized as Aḩmadābād) is a village in Gavdul-e Gharbi Rural District of the Central District in Malekan County, East Azerbaijan province, Iran.

== Demographics ==
=== Population ===
At the time of the 2006 National Census, the village's population was 382 in 99 households. The following census in 2011 counted 419 people in 103 households. The 2016 census measured the population of the village as 546 people in 159 households.
