= Yowlqonluy =

Yowlqonluy (Persian: يولقنلوي), also rendered as Yowlqunlu and Yulqunlu, may refer to:

- Yowlqonluy-e Jadid
- Yowlqonluy-e Qadim
