= Tazeh Kand-e Khan Kandi =

Village in East Azerbaijan province, Iran

Tazeh Kand-e Khan Kandi Persian: تازه كندخانكندي
- Village
- Location within Iran
- Coordinates: 37°09′31″N 46°04′21″E
- Country: Iran
- Province: East Azerbaijan
- County: Malekan
- District: Central
- Rural District: Gavdul-e Gharbi

Population (2016)
  - Total: 538
- Time zone: UTC+3:30 (IRST)

Tazeh Kand-e Khan Kandi (Persian: تازه كندخانكندي) (Note: Also romanized as Tāzeh Kand-e Khān Kandī) is a village in Gavdul-e Gharbi Rural District of the Central District in Malekan County, East Azerbaijan province, Iran.

== Demographics ==
=== Population ===
At the time of the 2006 National Census, the village's population was 481 in 108 households. The following census in 2011 counted 520 people in 134 households. The 2016 census measured the population of the village as 538 people in 165 households.
