= Sheykh ol Eslam =

Sheykh ol Eslam (Persian: شيخ الاسلام) may refer to:

- Sheykh ol Eslam, Hashtrud, East Azerbaijan Province
- Sheykh ol Eslam, Malekan, East Azerbaijan Province
- Sheykh ol Eslam, Kurdistan
