= Molla Sarab =

Village in East Azerbaijan province, Iran

Molla Sarab Persian: ملاسراب
- Village
- Location within Iran
- Coordinates: 37°06′23″N 46°06′07″E
- Country: Iran
- Province: East Azerbaijan
- County: Malekan
- District: Central
- Rural District: Gavdul-e Gharbi

Population (2016)
  - Total: 951
- Time zone: UTC+3:30 (IRST)

Molla Sarab (Persian: ملاسراب) (Note: Also romanized as Mollā Sarāb) is a village in Gavdul-e Gharbi Rural District of the Central District in Malekan County, East Azerbaijan province, Iran.

== Demographics ==
=== Population ===
At the time of the 2006 National Census, the village's population was 912 in 195 households. The following census in 2011 counted 1,004 people in 261 households. The 2016 census measured the population of the village as 951 people in 262 households.
