= Meydan Jiq =

Meydan Jiq or Meydanjiq (Persian: ميدانجيق) may refer to:

- Meydan Jiq, Malekan
- Meydan Jiq, Sarab
