= Bayqut =

Village in East Azerbaijan province, Iran

Bayqut Persian: بايقوت
- Village
- Location within Iran
- Coordinates: 37°09′22″N 46°03′19″E
- Country: Iran
- Province: East Azerbaijan
- County: Malekan
- District: Central
- Rural District: Gavdul-e Gharbi

Population (2016)
  - Total: 3,920
- Time zone: UTC+3:30 (IRST)

Bayqut (Persian: بايقوت) (Note: Also romanized as Bāyqūt; Turkish: Bayqut) is a village in, and the capital of, Gavdul-e Gharbi Rural District in the Central District of Malekan County, East Azerbaijan province, Iran.

== Demographics ==
=== Population ===
At the time of the 2006 National Census, the village's population was 3,414 in 792 households. The following census in 2011 counted 3,741 people in 1,001 households. The 2016 census measured the population of the village as 3,920 people in 1,142 households.
