= Gavdul-e Jonubi Rural District =

Rural district in East Azerbaijan province, Iran

Gavdul-e Jonubi Rural District Persian: دهستان گاودول جنوبی
- Rural District
- Location within Iran
- Coordinates: 37°06′N 46°13′E
- Country: Iran
- Province: East Azerbaijan
- County: Malekan
- District: Aq Manar
- Established: 2023
- Capital: Damirchi
- Time zone: UTC+3:30 (IRST)

Gavdul-e Jonubi Rural District (Persian: دهستان گاودول جنوبی) is in Aq Manar District of Malekan County, East Azerbaijan province, Iran. Its capital is the village of Damirchi, whose population at the time of the 2016 National Census was 1,084 people in 310 households.

== History ==
In 2023, Gavdul-e Sharqi Rural District was separated from the Central District in the formation of Aq Manar District, and Gavdul-e Jonubi Rural District was created in the new district.

== Other villages in the rural district ==
- Amir Ghayeb
- Bayram Kandi
- Dash Bolagh
- Nosratabad
- Qorban Kandi
