= Godaklu =

Godaklu (Persian: گدكلو) may refer to:

- Godaklu, East Azerbaijan
- Godaklu, West Azerbaijan
