= Laklar =

Laklar (Persian: لكلر) may refer to:

- Laklar, Hashtrud
- Laklar, Malekan
