= Tappeh-ye Esmailabad =

Village in East Azerbaijan province, Iran

Tappeh-ye Esmailabad Persian: تپه اسماعيل اباد
- Village
- Location within Iran
- Coordinates: 37°05′29″N 46°07′07″E
- Country: Iran
- Province: East Azerbaijan
- County: Malekan
- District: Central
- Rural District: Gavdul-e Markazi

Population (2016)
  - Total: 1,720
- Time zone: UTC+3:30 (IRST)

Tappeh-ye Esmailabad (Persian: تپه اسماعيل اباد) (Note: Also romanized as Tappeh-ye Esmā‘īlābād) is a village in Gavdul-e Markazi Rural District of the Central District in Malekan County, East Azerbaijan province, Iran.

== Demographics ==
=== Population ===
At the time of the 2006 National Census, the village's population was 1,529 in 347 households. The following census in 2011 counted 1,712 people in 490 households. The 2016 census measured the population of the village as 1,720 people in 485 households.
