= Idahluy =

Idahluy (Persian: ايده لوي) may refer to:

- Idahluy-e Bozorg
- Idahluy-e Kuchek
