= Idahluy-e Kuchek =

Village in East Azerbaijan province, Iran

Idahluy-e Kuchek Persian: ایده‌لوی کوچک
- Village
- Location within Iran
- Coordinates: 37°10′12″N 46°20′12″E
- Country: Iran
- Province: East Azerbaijan
- County: Malekan
- District: Aq Manar
- Rural District: Gavdul-e Sharqi

Population (2016)
  - Total: 136
- Time zone: UTC+3:30 (IRST)

Idahluy-e Kuchek (Persian: ایده‌لوی کوچک) (Note: Also romanized as Īdahlūy-e Kūchek; also known as ‘Alīābād and Īdahlū-ye Kūchek) is a village in Gavdul-e Sharqi Rural District of Aq Manar District in Malekan County, East Azerbaijan province, Iran.

== Demographics ==
=== Population ===
At the time of the 2006 National Census, the village's population was 128 in 29 households, when it was in the Central District. The following census in 2011 counted 116 people in 31 households. The 2016 census measured the population of the village as 136 people in 39 households.

In 2023, the rural district was separated from the district in the formation of Aq Manar District.
