= Salari, Iran =

Salari (Persian: سالاري) may refer to:

- Salari, Fars, a place in Fars Province, Iran
- Salari, Lorestan, a village in Lorestan Province, Iran
- Salari, Razavi Khorasan, a village in Razavi Khorasan Province, Iran
