= Yuzbash Kandi =

Village in East Azerbaijan province, Iran

Yuzbash Kandi Persian: يوزباش كندي
- Village
- Location within Iran
- Coordinates: 37°06′07″N 46°06′52″E
- Country: Iran
- Province: East Azerbaijan
- County: Malekan
- District: Central
- Rural District: Gavdul-e Markazi

Population (2016)
  - Total: 1,693
- Time zone: UTC+3:30 (IRST)

Yuzbash Kandi (Persian: يوزباش كندي) (Note: Also romanized as Yūzbāsh Kandī) is a village in Gavdul-e Markazi Rural District of the Central District in Malekan County, East Azerbaijan province, Iran.

== Demographics ==
=== Population ===
At the time of the 2006 National Census, the village's population was 1,699 in 384 households. The following census in 2011 counted 1,829 people in 476 households. The 2016 census measured the population of the village as 1,693 people in 503 households.
