= Sari Qayah =

Sari Qayah or Sari Qayeh or Sariqayeh (Persian: ساري قيه) may refer to:

- Sari Qayah, Ardabil
- Sari Qayah, Hashtrud, East Azerbaijan Province
- Sari Qayeh, Malekan, East Azerbaijan Province
- Sari Qayeh, Maragheh, East Azerbaijan Province
- Sari Qayah, Sarab, East Azerbaijan Province
