= Sharanlu =

Village in East Azerbaijan province, Iran

Sharanlu Persian: شرانلو
- Village
- Location within Iran
- Coordinates: 37°09′26″N 46°01′35″E
- Country: Iran
- Province: East Azerbaijan
- County: Malekan
- District: Central
- Rural District: Gavdul-e Gharbi

Population (2016)
  - Total: 534
- Time zone: UTC+3:30 (IRST)

Sharanlu (Persian: شرانلو) (Note: Also romanized as Sharānlū) is a village in Gavdul-e Gharbi Rural District of the Central District in Malekan County, East Azerbaijan province, Iran.

== Demographics ==
=== Population ===
At the time of the 2006 National Census, the village's population was 423 in 101 households. The following census in 2011 counted 325 people in 82 households. The 2016 census measured the population of the village as 534 people in 140 households.
