= Owchbolagh, East Azerbaijan =

Owchbolagh اوچ بلاغ
- Village
- Location within Iran
- Coordinates: 37°12′32″N 46°17′53″E
- Country: Iran
- Province: East Azerbaijan
- County: Malekan
- Bakhsh: Central
- Rural District: Gavdul-e Sharqi

Population (2006)
  - Total: 118
- Time zone: UTC+3:30 (IRST)
  - Summer (DST): UTC+4:30 (IRDT)

Owchbolagh (Persian: اوچ بلاغ, also Romanized as Owchbolāgh and Ūch Bolāgh) is a village in Gavdul-e Sharqi Rural District, in the Central District of Malekan County, East Azerbaijan Province, Iran. At the 2006 census, its population was 118, in 26 families.
