= Aghcheh Dizaj, Malekan =

Village in East Azerbaijan province, Iran

Aghcheh Dizaj Persian: اغچه ديزج
- Village
- Location within Iran
- Coordinates: 37°08′52″N 46°05′02″E
- Country: Iran
- Province: East Azerbaijan
- County: Malekan
- District: Central
- Rural District: Gavdul-e Gharbi

Population (2016)
  - Total: 2,362
- Time zone: UTC+3:30 (IRST)

Aghcheh Dizaj (Persian: اغچه ديزج) (Note: Also romanized as Āghcheh Dīzaj; and Āghchehdīzaj) is a village in Gavdul-e Gharbi Rural District of the Central District in Malekan County, East Azerbaijan province, Iran.

== Demographics ==
=== Population ===
At the time of the 2006 National Census, the village's population was 2,023 in 533 households. The following census in 2011 counted 2,153 people in 621 households. The 2016 census measured the population of the village as 2,362 people in 770 households.
