= Hoseynabad, Malekan =

Village in East Azerbaijan province, Iran

Hoseynabad Persian: حسين اباد
- Village
- Location within Iran
- Coordinates: 37°04′20″N 46°09′00″E
- Country: Iran
- Province: East Azerbaijan
- County: Malekan
- District: Central
- Rural District: Gavdul-e Markazi

Population (2016)
  - Total: 2,258
- Time zone: UTC+3:30 (IRST)

Hoseynabad (Persian: حسين اباد) (Note: Also romanized as Ḩoseynābād; also known as Husainābād) is a village in Gavdul-e Markazi Rural District of the Central District in Malekan County, East Azerbaijan province, Iran.

== Demographics ==
=== Population ===
At the time of the 2006 National Census, the village's population was 1,918 in 447 households. The following census in 2011 counted 2,119 people in 607 households. The 2016 census measured the population of the village as 2,258 people in 685 households.
