= Majidabad, Malekan =

Village in East Azerbaijan province, Iran

Majidabad Persian: مجيداباد
- Village
- Location within Iran
- Coordinates: 37°11′01″N 45°58′21″E
- Country: Iran
- Province: East Azerbaijan
- County: Malekan
- District: Central
- Rural District: Gavdul-e Gharbi

Population (2016)
  - Total: 568
- Time zone: UTC+3:30 (IRST)

Majidabad (Persian: مجيداباد) (Note: Also romanized as Majīdābād) is a village in Gavdul-e Gharbi Rural District of the Central District in Malekan County, East Azerbaijan province, Iran.

== Demographics ==
=== Population ===
At the time of the 2006 National Census, the village's population was 543 in 136 households. The following census in 2011 counted 540 people in 139 households. The 2016 census measured the population of the village as 568 people in 158 households.
