= Aq Manar =

Village in East Azerbaijan province, Iran

Aq Manar Persian: اق منار
- Village
- Location within Iran
- Coordinates: 37°10′21″N 46°15′15″E
- Country: Iran
- Province: East Azerbaijan
- County: Malekan
- District: Aq Manar
- Rural District: Gavdul-e Sharqi

Population (2016)
  - Total: 1,573
- Time zone: UTC+3:30 (IRST)

Aq Manar (Persian: اق منار) (Note: Also romanized as Āq Manār and Āqmanār) is a village in, and the former capital of, Gavdul-e Sharqi Rural District in Aq Manar District of Malekan County, East Azerbaijan province, Iran, serving as the capital of the district. The capital of the rural district has been transferred to the village of Idahluy-e Bozorg.

== Demographics ==
=== Population ===
At the time of the 2006 National Census, the village's population was 1,461 in 328 households, when it was in the Central District. The following census in 2011 counted 1,669 people in 382 households. The 2016 census measured the population of the village as 1,573 people in 514 households. It was the most populous village in its rural district.

In 2023, the rural district was separated from the district in the formation of Aq Manar District.
