= Lotfabad, East Azerbaijan =

Lotfabad لطف اباد
- Village
- Location within Iran
- Coordinates: 37°00′14″N 46°15′21″E
- Country: Iran
- Province: East Azerbaijan
- County: Malekan
- Bakhsh: Leylan
- Rural District: Leylan-e Jonubi

Population (2006)
  - Total: 289
- Time zone: UTC+3:30 (IRST)
  - Summer (DST): UTC+4:30 (IRDT)

Lotfabad (Persian: لطف اباد, also Romanized as Loţfābād) is a village in Leylan-e Jonubi Rural District, Leylan District, Malekan County, East Azerbaijan Province, Iran. At the 2006 census, its population was 289, in 63 families.
