= Qoli Kandi, Malekan =

Qoli Kandi قلي كندي
- Village
- Location within Iran
- Coordinates: 37°11′43″N 46°09′48″E
- Country: Iran
- Province: East Azerbaijan
- County: Malekan
- Bakhsh: Central
- Rural District: Gavdul-e Markazi

Population (2006)
  - Total: 465
- Time zone: UTC+3:30 (IRST)
  - Summer (DST): UTC+4:30 (IRDT)

Qoli Kandi (Persian: قلي كندي, also Romanized as Qolī Kandī) is a village in Gavdul-e Markazi Rural District, in the Central District of Malekan County, East Azerbaijan Province, Iran. At the 2006 census, its population was 465, in 120 families.
