= Yowlqonluy-e Jadid =

Village in East Azerbaijan province, Iran

Yowlqonluy-e Jadid Persian: يولقنلوي جديد
- Village
- Location within Iran
- Coordinates: 37°10′37″N 46°01′25″E
- Country: Iran
- Province: East Azerbaijan
- County: Malekan
- District: Central
- Rural District: Gavdul-e Gharbi

Population (2016)
  - Total: 2,522
- Time zone: UTC+3:30 (IRST)

Yowlqonluy-e Jadid (Persian: يولقنلوي جديد) (Note: Also romanized as Yowlqonlūy-e Jadīd; also known as Yolghoonlooé Jadid, Yowlqūnlū-ye Jadīd, Yūlqūnlū-ye Jadīd, and Yurgakli) is a village in Gavdul-e Gharbi Rural District of the Central District in Malekan County, East Azerbaijan province, Iran.

== Demographics ==
=== Population ===
At the time of the 2006 National Census, the village's population was 2,254 in 627 households. The following census in 2011 counted 2,524 people in 692 households. The 2016 census measured the population of the village as 2,522 people in 778 households.
