= Leylan-e Sharqi Rural District =

Rural district in East Azerbaijan province, Iran

Leylan-e Sharqi Rural District Persian: دهستان لیلان شرقی
- Rural District
- Location within Iran
- Coordinates: 37°00′N 46°16′E
- Country: Iran
- Province: East Azerbaijan
- County: Leylan
- District: Shirin Kand
- Established: 2023
- Capital: Cheghalu
- Time zone: UTC+3:30 (IRST)

Leylan-e Sharqi Rural District (Persian: دهستان لیلان شرقی) is in Shirin Kand District of Leylan County, East Azerbaijan province, Iran. Its capital is the village of Cheghalu, whose population at the time of the 2016 National Census was 466 people in 138 households.

== History ==
In 2023, Leylan District (Note: Renamed the Central District of Leylan County) was separated from Malekan County in the establishment of Leylan County and renamed the Central District. Leylan-e Sharqi Rural District was created in the new Shirin Kand District.

== Other villages in the rural district ==
- Qareh Gol
