= Laklar, Malekan =

Village in East Azerbaijan province, Iran

Laklar Persian: لكلر
- Village
- Location within Iran
- Coordinates: 37°06′32″N 46°05′00″E
- Country: Iran
- Province: East Azerbaijan
- County: Malekan
- District: Central
- Rural District: Gavdul-e Markazi

Population (2016)
  - Total: 4,767
- Time zone: UTC+3:30 (IRST)

Laklar (Persian: لكلر) is a village in Gavdul-e Markazi Rural District of the Central District in Malekan County, East Azerbaijan province, Iran.

== Demographics ==
=== Population ===
At the time of the 2006 National Census, the village's population was 4,284 in 1,101 households. The following census in 2011 counted 4,601 people in 1,303 households. The 2016 census measured the population of the village as 4,767 people in 1,375 households. It was the most populous village in its rural district.
