= Yowlqonluy-e Qadim =

Village in East Azerbaijan province, Iran

Yowlqonluy-e Qadim Persian: يولقنلوي قديم
- Village
- Location within Iran
- Coordinates: 37°11′16″N 46°02′04″E
- Country: Iran
- Province: East Azerbaijan
- County: Malekan
- District: Central
- Rural District: Gavdul-e Gharbi

Population (2016)
  - Total: 694
- Time zone: UTC+3:30 (IRST)

Yowlqonluy-e Qadim (Persian: يولقنلوي قديم) (Note: Also romanized as Yowlqonlūy-e Qadīm; also known as Kegna Yulghūnli, Kegna Yurgakli, Kohneh Kand, Yolghoonlooé Ghadim, Yowlqūnlū-ye Qadīm, and Yūlqūnlū-ye Qadīm) is a village in Gavdul-e Gharbi Rural District of the Central District in Malekan County, East Azerbaijan province, Iran.

== Demographics ==
=== Population ===
At the time of the 2006 National Census, the village's population was 578 in 156 households. The following census in 2011 counted 660 people in 183 households. The 2016 census measured the population of the village as 694 people in 213 households.
