= Leylan-e Gharbi Rural District =

Rural district in East Azerbaijan province, Iran

Leylan-e Gharbi Rural District Persian: دهستان لیلان غربی
- Rural District
- Location within Iran
- Coordinates: 37°02′N 46°11′E
- Country: Iran
- Province: East Azerbaijan
- County: Leylan
- District: Central
- Established: 2023
- Capital: Qareh Khezer
- Time zone: UTC+3:30 (IRST)

Leylan-e Gharbi Rural District (Persian: دهستان لیلان غربی) is in the Central District (Note: Formerly Leylan District of Malekan County) of Leylan County, East Azerbaijan province, Iran. Its capital is the village of Qareh Khezer, whose population at the time of the 2016 National Census was 1,813 people in 565 households.

== History ==
In 2023, Leylan District (Note: Renamed the Central District of Leylan County) was separated from Malekan County in the establishment of Leylan County and renamed the Central District. Leylan-e Gharbi Rural District was created in the same district.

== Other villages in the rural district ==
- Abdolabad
- Aghkand-e Qareh Khezer
- Godaklu
- Qandhar
