= Bakhtak Leylan Castle =

Castle in East Azerbaijan Province, Iran

- قلعه بختک لیلان
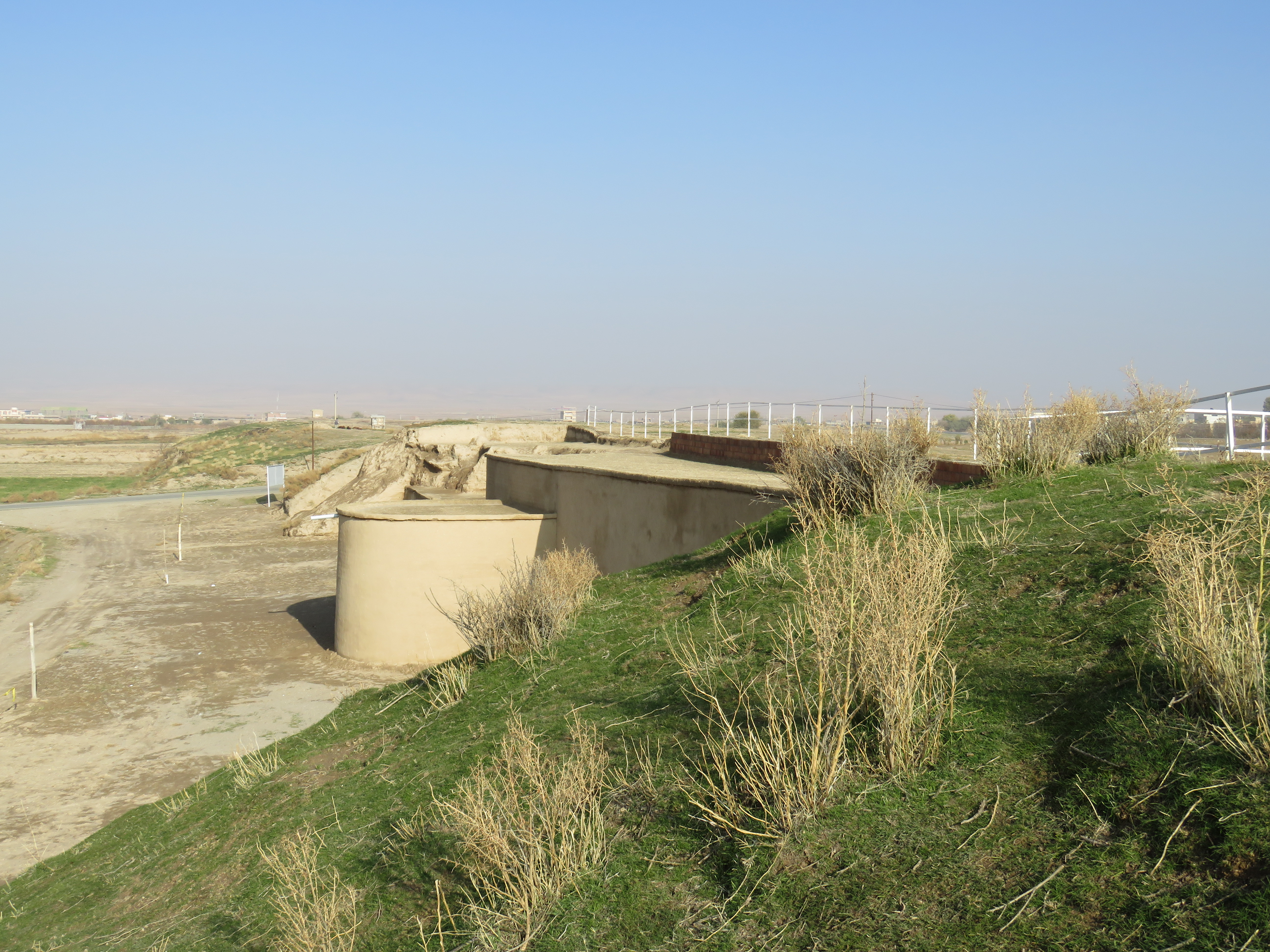

General information
- Type: Castle
- Location: Malekan County, East Azerbaijan Province, Iran
- Coordinates: 37.0119°N 46.1933°E

Bakhtak Leylan Castle (Persian: قلعه بختک لیلان) is a historical castle located in Malekan County in East Azerbaijan Province, The longevity of this fortress dates back to the Prehistoric times of ancient Iran.
