= Mobarak Shahr =

City in East Azerbaijan province, Iran

Mobarak Shahr Persian: مبارک ‌شهر
- City
- Location within Iran
- Coordinates: 37°10′47″N 46°03′40″E
- Country: Iran
- Province: East Azerbaijan
- County: Malekan
- District: Central
- Established as a city: 2013

Population (2016)
  - Total: 4,456
- Time zone: UTC+3:30 (IRST)

Mobarak Shahr (Persian: مبارک ‌شهر) (Note: Formerly Mobarakabad (مبارک‌آباد), also romanized as Mobārakābād) is a city in the Central District of Malekan County, East Azerbaijan province, Iran.

== Demographics ==
=== Population ===
At the time of the 2006 National Census, the population was 3,661 in 889 households, when it was the village of Mobarakabad in Gavdul-e Gharbi Rural District. The following census in 2011 counted 4,198 people in 1,178 households. The 2016 census measured the population as 4,456 people in 1,317 households, by which time the village had been converted to a city as Mobarak Shahr.
