= Meydan Jiq, Malekan =

Village in East Azerbaijan province, Iran

Meydan Jiq Persian: ميدانجيق
- Village
- Location within Iran
- Coordinates: 37°09′01″N 46°07′27″E
- Country: Iran
- Province: East Azerbaijan
- County: Malekan
- District: Central
- Rural District: Gavdul-e Markazi

Population (2016)
  - Total: 2,087
- Time zone: UTC+3:30 (IRST)

Meydan Jiq (Persian: ميدانجيق) (Note: Also romanized as Meydān Jīq and Meydānjīq) is a village in Gavdul-e Markazi Rural District of the Central District in Malekan County, East Azerbaijan province, Iran.

== Demographics ==
=== Population ===
At the time of the 2006 National Census, the village's population was 1,993 in 482 households. The following census in 2011 counted 2,110 people in 635 households. The 2016 census measured the population of the village as 2,087 people in 646 households.
