= Arpa Darrehsi =

Arpa Darrehsi or Arpa Darehsi (Persian: ارپادره سي) may refer to:

- Arpa Darrehsi, Malekan
- Arpa Darrehsi, Tabriz
