= Salari, Fars =

Salari jalil سالاري جلیل
- village
- Salari jalil
- Location within Iran
- Coordinates: 30°27′09″N 51°16′11″E
- Country: Iran
- Province: Fars
- County: Rostam
- Bakhsh: Sorna
- Rural District: Poshtkuh-e Rostam

Population (2006)
  - Total: 190
- Time zone: UTC+3:30 (IRST)
  - Summer (DST): UTC+4:30 (IRDT)

Salari (Persian: سالاري, also Romanized as Sālārī) is a village in Poshtkuh-e Rostam Rural District, Sorna District, Rostam County, Fars province, Iran. At the 2006 census, its population was 190, in 42 families.
