= Sheykh ol Eslam, Hashtrud =

Sheykh ol Eslam شيخ الاسلام
- Village
- Location within Iran
- Coordinates: 37°30′57″N 46°39′23″E
- Country: Iran
- Province: East Azerbaijan
- County: Hashtrud
- Bakhsh: Nazarkahrizi
- Rural District: Almalu

Population (2006)
  - Total: 143
- Time zone: UTC+3:30 (IRST)
  - Summer (DST): UTC+4:30 (IRDT)

Sheykh ol Eslam (Persian: شيخ الاسلام, also Romanized as Sheykh ol Eslām) is a village in Almalu Rural District, Nazarkahrizi District, Hashtrud County, East Azerbaijan Province, Iran. At the 2006 census, its population was 143, in 23 families.
