= Salarabad, Khuzestan =

Salarabad سالاراباد
- Village
- Location within Iran
- Coordinates: 30°37′16″N 50°15′48″E
- Country: Iran
- Province: Khuzestan
- County: Behbahan
- Bakhsh: Central
- Rural District: Howmeh

Population (2006)
  - Total: 513
- Time zone: UTC+3:30 (IRST)
  - Summer (DST): UTC+4:30 (IRDT)

Salarabad (Persian: سالاراباد, also Romanized as Sālārābād) is a village in Howmeh Rural District, in the Central District of Behbahan County, Khuzestan Province, Iran. At the 2006 census, its population was 513, in 89 families.
