= Shirinabad, Razavi Khorasan =

Shirinabad شيرين آباد
- village
- Location within Iran
- Coordinates: 35°52′27″N 59°37′02″E
- Country: Iran
- Province: Razavi Khorasan
- County: Fariman
- Bakhsh: Central
- Rural District: Sang Bast

Population (2006)
  - Total: 30
- Time zone: UTC+3:30 (IRST)
  - Summer (DST): UTC+4:30 (IRDT)

Shirinabad (Persian: شيرين آباد, romanized: šīrīnābād) is a village in Sang Bast Rural District, in the Central District of Fariman County, Razavi Khorasan Province, Iran.

At the 2006 census, its population was 30, in 10 families.
