= Lotfabad, Narmashir =

Lotfabad لطف اباد
- village
- Location within Iran
- Coordinates: 28°55′45″N 58°29′28″E
- Country: Iran
- Province: Kerman
- County: Narmashir
- Bakhsh: Rud Ab
- Rural District: Rud Ab-e Gharbi

Population (2006)
  - Total: 582
- Time zone: UTC+3:30 (IRST)
  - Summer (DST): UTC+4:30 (IRDT)

Lotfabad (Persian: لطف اباد, also Romanized as Loţfābād) is a village in Rud Ab-e Gharbi Rural District, Rud Ab District, Narmashir County, Kerman Province, Iran. A census in 2006 counted 582 people and 143 families in the village.
