= Sarmil =

Sarmil سرميل
- Village
- Location within Iran
- Coordinates: 34°20′07″N 46°08′17″E
- Country: Iran
- Province: Kermanshah
- County: Dalahu
- Bakhsh: Central
- Rural District: Howmeh-ye Kerend

Population (2006)
  - Total: 104
- Time zone: UTC+3:30 (IRST)
  - Summer (DST): UTC+4:30 (IRDT)

Sarmil (Persian: سرميل, also Romanized as Sarmīl, Sar-e Mīl, and Sar-i-Mil; also known as Sar-e Mīl-e Soflá and Shīrīnābād) is a village in Howmeh-ye Kerend Rural District, in the Central District of Dalahu County, Kermanshah province, Iran. At the 2006 census, its population was 104, in 23 families.

It is perhaps worth noticing that in the English-language translation of the 'Treaty of Peace between Turkey and Persia, signed at Zohab on the 17th May, in the year 1639' between Murad IV and Shah Safi that was prepared for the Erzurum Commission by Stratford Canning and Joseph von Hammer in about December 1842 from the copy in the Imperial Library at Vienna, we find: 'Serimnil is fixed as frontier between Dairtenk and Darna. That part of the country of Haronia occupied by the tribes of Djaf and Zilja Uddin will belong to the Sultan. Pezai and Zerdony remain to the Shah.' Dated 'Erzeroum, November 25, 1843,’ James Redhouse’s translation of the subsequent 'Ratification of the Treaty' of 1639 in Ottoman registers, refers to 'the place called Sair-mil being fixed as the boundary of Dairtenk.' The same collection of translated documents prepared for the Commission also includes translated extracts that Redhouse supplied from 'The Annals of Naeemau' and the ‘”Jehaun-Numau" ... by Kiatib Chelebi,’ where we find 'the place called Sar-meel' and 'the place called Sair-meen (Sair-meel, i.e., the chief land-mark).’ See Treaties Concluded between Turkey and Persia in 1639, 1746, and 1822 in The National Archives (TNA) at Kew, FO 881/10007, pp. 4,6, 9, 11.
