= Owch Bolagh, Kurdistan =

Owch Bolagh اوچ بلاغ
- Village
- Location within Iran
- Coordinates: 35°24′24″N 47°50′00″E
- Country: Iran
- Province: Kurdistan
- County: Qorveh
- Bakhsh: Serishabad
- Rural District: Qaslan

Population (2006)
  - Total: 215
- Time zone: UTC+3:30 (IRST)
  - Summer (DST): UTC+4:30 (IRDT)

Owch Bolagh (Persian: اوچ بلاغ, also Romanized as Owch Bolāgh, Owchbolāgh, and Ūch Bolāgh; also known as Ichūbulāq) is a village in Qaslan Rural District, Serishabad District, Qorveh County, Kurdistan Province, Iran. At the 2006 census, its population was 215, in 57 families. The village is populated by Kurds.
