= Shirinabad, Kerman =

Shirinabad شيرين اباد
- Village
- Location within Iran
- Coordinates: 30°29′42″N 57°48′38″E
- Country: Iran
- Province: Kerman
- County: Kerman
- Bakhsh: Shahdad
- Rural District: Takab

Population (2006)
  - Total: 27
- Time zone: UTC+3:30 (IRST)
  - Summer (DST): UTC+4:30 (IRDT)

Shirinabad (Persian: شيرين اباد, also Romanized as Shīrīnābād) is a village in Takab Rural District, Shahdad District, Kerman County, Kerman Province, Iran. At the 2006 census, its population was 27, in 6 families.
