= Gavdul, Ilam =

Gavdul گاو دول
- Village
- Location within Iran
- Coordinates: 33°47′33″N 47°17′09″E
- Country: Iran
- Province: Ilam
- County: Holeylan
- Rural District: Zardalan

Population (2006)
  - Total: 80
- Time zone: UTC+3:30 (IRST)
  - Summer (DST): UTC+4:30 (IRDT)

Gavdul (Persian: گاو دول, also Romanized as Gāvdūl and Gāv Dūl) is a village in Zardalan Rural District, Holeylan County, Ilam Province, Iran. At the 2006 census, its population was 80, in 18 families. The village is populated by Kurds.
