= Salarabad, Kerman =

Salarabad سالاراباد
- Village
- Location within Iran
- Coordinates: 30°24′23″N 57°50′42″E
- Country: Iran
- Province: Kerman
- County: Kerman
- Bakhsh: Shahdad
- Rural District: Takab

Population (2006)
  - Total: 420
- Time zone: UTC+3:30 (IRST)
  - Summer (DST): UTC+4:30 (IRDT)

Salarabad (Persian: سالاراباد, also Romanized as Sālārābād; also known as Sālāābād) is a village in Takab Rural District, Shahdad District, Kerman County, Kerman Province, Iran. At the 2006 census, its population was 420, in 95 families.
