= Godaklu, West Azerbaijan =

Godaklu گدكلو
- Village
- Location within Iran
- Coordinates: 36°39′48″N 46°38′06″E
- Country: Iran
- Province: West Azerbaijan
- County: Shahin Dezh
- Bakhsh: Central
- Rural District: Hulasu

Population (2006)
  - Total: 267
- Time zone: UTC+3:30 (IRST)
  - Summer (DST): UTC+4:30 (IRDT)

Godaklu (Persian: گدكلو, also Romanized as Godaklū; also known as Godallū and Kodallū) is a village in Hulasu Rural District, in the Central District of Shahin Dezh County, West Azerbaijan Province, Iran. At the 2006 census, its population was 267, in 48 families.
