= Shirin Kand, Maragheh =

Shirin Kand شيرين كند
- Village
- Location within Iran
- Coordinates: 37°08′15″N 46°39′13″E
- Country: Iran
- Province: East Azerbaijan
- County: Maragheh
- Bakhsh: Saraju
- Rural District: Quri Chay-ye Gharbi

Population (2006)
  - Total: 11
- Time zone: UTC+3:30 (IRST)
  - Summer (DST): UTC+4:30 (IRDT)

Shirin Kand (Persian: شيرين كند, also Romanized as Shīrīn Kand) is a village in Quri Chay-ye Gharbi Rural District, Saraju District, Maragheh County, East Azerbaijan Province, Iran. At the 2006 census, its population was 11, in 4 families.
