= Owch Bolagh, East Azerbaijan =

Owch Bolagh اوچبلاغ
- Village
- Location within Iran
- Coordinates: 37°00′10″N 47°10′13″E
- Country: Iran
- Province: East Azerbaijan
- County: Charuymaq
- Bakhsh: Shadian
- Rural District: Charuymaq-e Jonubesharqi

Population (2006)
  - Total: 29
- Time zone: UTC+3:30 (IRST)
  - Summer (DST): UTC+4:30 (IRDT)

Owch Bolagh (Persian: اوچبلاغ, also Romanized as Owch Bolāgh; also known as Owch Bolāghī and Ūch Bolāghī) is a village in Charuymaq-e Jonubesharqi Rural District, Shadian District, Charuymaq County, East Azerbaijan Province, Iran. At the 2006 census, its population was 29, in 6 families.
