= Lotfabad-e Shur =

Lotfabad-e Shur لطف ابادشور
- Village
- Location within Iran
- Coordinates: 30°30′29″N 55°59′04″E
- Country: Iran
- Province: Kerman
- County: Rafsanjan
- Bakhsh: Central
- Rural District: Azadegan

Population (2006)
  - Total: 700
- Time zone: UTC+3:30 (IRST)
  - Summer (DST): UTC+4:30 (IRDT)

Lotfabad-e Shur (Persian: لطف ابادشور, also Romanized as Loţfābād-e Shūr; also known as Loţfābād and Lotf Abad Hoomeh) is a village in Azadegan Rural District, in the Central District of Rafsanjan County, Kerman Province, Iran. At the 2006 census, its population was 700, in 162 families.
