= Salarabad, Razavar =

Salarabad سالارآباد
- Village
- Location within Iran
- Coordinates: 34°42′41″N 46°57′00″E
- Country: Iran
- Province: Kermanshah
- County: Kermanshah
- Bakhsh: Central
- Rural District: Razavar

Population (2006)
  - Total: 527
- Time zone: UTC+3:30 (IRST)
  - Summer (DST): UTC+4:30 (IRDT)

Salarabad (Persian: سالارآباد, also Romanized as Sālārābād) is a village in Razavar Rural District, in the Central District of Kermanshah County, Kermanshah Province, Iran. At the 2006 census, its population was 527, in 114 families.
