= Sari Qayah, Sarab =

Sari Qayah ساري قيه
- Village
- Location within Iran
- Coordinates: 37°57′22″N 47°52′57″E
- Country: Iran
- Province: East Azerbaijan
- County: Sarab
- Bakhsh: Central
- Rural District: Sain

Population (2006)
  - Total: 271
- Time zone: UTC+3:30 (IRST)
  - Summer (DST): UTC+4:30 (IRDT)

Sari Qayah (Persian: ساري قيه, also Romanized as Sārī Qayah) is a village in Sain Rural District, in the Central District of Sarab County, East Azerbaijan Province, Iran. At the 2006 census, its population was 271, in 51 families.
