= Qoli Kandi, Charuymaq =

Qoli Kandi قلي كندي
- Village
- Location within Iran
- Coordinates: 37°04′28″N 46°43′25″E
- Country: Iran
- Province: East Azerbaijan
- County: Charuymaq
- Bakhsh: Central
- Rural District: Quri Chay-ye Sharqi

Population (2006)
  - Total: 100
- Time zone: UTC+3:30 (IRST)
  - Summer (DST): UTC+4:30 (IRDT)

Qoli Kandi (Persian: قلي كندي, also Romanized as Qolī Kandī) is a village in Quri Chay-ye Sharqi Rural District, in the Central District of Charuymaq County, East Azerbaijan Province, Iran. At the 2006 census, its population was 100, in 18 families.
