= Lotfabad, Seyyedvaliyeddin =

Lotfabad لطف اباد
- Village
- Country: Iran
- Province: Khuzestan
- County: Dezful
- Bakhsh: Sardasht
- Rural District: Seyyedvaliyeddin

Population (2006)
  - Total: 166
- Time zone: UTC+3:30 (IRST)
  - Summer (DST): UTC+4:30 (IRDT)

Lotfabad (Persian: لطف اباد, also Romanized as Loṭfābād) is a village in Seyyedvaliyeddin Rural District, Sardasht District, Dezful County, Khuzestan Province, Iran. In 2006, its population was 166, in 28 families.
