= Salari, Lorestan =

Salari سالاري
- Village
- Location within Iran
- Coordinates: 33°50′18″N 48°16′16″E
- Country: Iran
- Province: Lorestan
- County: Selseleh
- Bakhsh: Central
- Rural District: Qaleh-ye Mozaffari

Population (2006)
  - Total: 88
- Time zone: UTC+3:30 (IRST)
  - Summer (DST): UTC+4:30 (IRDT)

Salari (Persian: سالاري, also Romanized as Sālārī; also known as Sālārābād-e Nadar) is a village in Qaleh-ye Mozaffari Rural District, in the Central District of Selseleh County, Lorestan Province, Iran. At the 2006 census, its population was 88, in 21 families.
