= Leylan =

City in East Azerbaijan province, Iran

Leylan Persian: ليلان
- City
- Location within Iran
- Coordinates: 37°00′43″N 46°12′19″E
- Country: Iran
- Province: East Azerbaijan
- County: Leylan
- District: Central
- Established as a city: 1997

Population (2016)
  - Total: 6,356
- Time zone: UTC+3:30 (IRST)

Leylan (Persian: ليلان) (Note: Also romanized as Lailān, Laylān, and Leylān) is a city in the Central District (Note: Formerly Leylan District of Malekan County) of Leylan County, East Azerbaijan province, Iran, serving as capital of both the county and the district. It was the administrative center for Leylan Rural District (Note: Renamed Leylan-e Jonubi Rural District) until its capital was transferred to the village of Turchi. The village of Leylan was converted to a city in 1997.

== History ==
The ancient Iranian town of Ganzak is identified as being near Leylan in the Miandoab plain. Ganzak was built by the Achaemenids, and was the seat of the satrap of Media. Later, it served as the capital of the kingdom of Atropatene.

== Demographics ==
=== Population ===
At the time of the 2006 National Census, the city's population was 6,079 in 1,468 households, when it was in Leylan District (Note: Renamed the Central District of Leylan County) of Malekan County. The following census in 2011 counted 6,175 people in 1,858 households. The 2016 census measured the population of the city as 6,356 people in 1,943 households.

In 2023, the district was separated from the county in the establishment of Leylan County and renamed the Central District, with Leylan as the capital of the new county.
