= Gavdul-e Gharbi Rural District =

Rural district in East Azerbaijan province, Iran

Gavdul-e Gharbi Rural District Persian: دهستان گاودول غربي
- Rural District
- Location within Iran
- Coordinates: 37°09′N 46°01′E
- Country: Iran
- Province: East Azerbaijan
- County: Malekan
- District: Central
- Established: 1987
- Capital: Bayqut

Population (2016)
  - Total: 17,573
- Time zone: UTC+3:30 (IRST)

Gavdul-e Gharbi Rural District (Persian: دهستان گاودول غربي) is in the Central District of Malekan County, East Azerbaijan province, Iran. Its capital is the village of Bayqut.

== Demographics ==
=== Population ===
At the time of the 2006 National Census, the rural district's population was 19,256 in 4,880 households. There were 20,762 inhabitants in 5,731 households at the following census of 2011. The 2016 census measured the population of the rural district as 17,573 in 5,368 households. The most populous of its 13 villages was Tazeh Qaleh, with 4,058 people.

=== Other villages in the rural district ===
- Aghcheh Dizaj
- Ahmadabad
- Majidabad
- Molla Sarab
- Sharanlu
- Sormahlu
- Tazeh Kand-e Khan Kandi
- Yowlqonluy-e Jadid
- Yowlqonluy-e Qadim
