= Gavdul-e Markazi Rural District =

Rural district in East Azerbaijan province, Iran

Gavdul-e Markazi Rural District Persian: دهستان گاودول مركزئ
- Rural District
- Location within Iran
- Coordinates: 37°09′N 46°08′E
- Country: Iran
- Province: East Azerbaijan
- County: Malekan
- District: Central
- Established: 1990
- Capital: Aruq

Population (2016)
  - Total: 29,010
- Time zone: UTC+3:30 (IRST)

Gavdul-e Markazi Rural District (Persian: دهستان گاودول مركزئ) is in the Central District of Malekan County, East Azerbaijan province, Iran. Its capital is the village of Aruq.

== Demographics ==
=== Population ===
At the time of the 2006 National Census, the rural district's population was 26,623 in 6,539 households. There were 28,383 inhabitants in 8,060 households at the following census of 2011. The 2016 census measured the population of the rural district as 29,010 in 8,614 households. The most populous of its 22 villages was Laklar, with 4,767 people.

=== Other villages in the rural district ===
- Aliabad-e Qeshlaq
- Hoseynabad
- Mehmandar-e Sofla
- Meydan Jiq
- Qaleh Juq
- Qareh Chal
- Qurijan
- Tappeh-ye Esmailabad
- Yuzbash Kandi
