= Leylan-e Shomali Rural District =

Rural district in East Azerbaijan province, Iran

Leylan-e Shomali Rural District Persian: دهستان ليلان شمالي
- Rural District
- Location within Iran
- Coordinates: 37°05′N 46°20′E
- Country: Iran
- Province: East Azerbaijan
- County: Leylan
- District: Shirin Kand
- Established: 1995
- Capital: Turaghay

Population (2016)
  - Total: 4,172
- Time zone: UTC+3:30 (IRST)

Leylan-e Shomali Rural District (Persian: دهستان ليلان شمالي) is in Shirin Kand District of Leylan County, East Azerbaijan province, Iran. Its capital is the village of Turaghay.

== Demographics ==
=== Population ===
At the time of the 2006 National Census, the rural district's population (as a part of Leylan District (Note: Renamed the Central District of Leylan County) in Malekan County) was 3,838 in 858 households. There were 4,338 inhabitants in 1,117 households at the following census of 2011. The 2016 census measured the population of the rural district as 4,172 in 1,236 households. The most populous of its 11 villages was Qush Qayeh, with 940 people.

In 2023, the district was separated from the county in the establishment of Leylan County and renamed the Central District. The rural district was transferred to the new Shirin Kand District.

=== Other villages in the rural district ===
- Arpa Darrehsi
- Qashaqchi
- Quzlu
- Tazeh Kand-e Hurilar
