= Shirin Kand District =

District in East Azerbaijan province, Iran

Shirin Kand District Persian: بخش شیرین‌کند
- District
- Location within Iran
- Coordinates: 37°03′N 46°20′E
- Country: Iran
- Province: East Azerbaijan
- County: Leylan
- Established: 2023
- Capital: Shirin Kand
- Time zone: UTC+3:30 (IRST)

Shirin Kand District (Persian: بخش شیرین‌کند) is in Leylan County of East Azerbaijan province, Iran. Its capital is the village of Shirin Kand, whose population at the time of the 2016 National Census was 2,744 people in 815 households.

== History ==
In 2023, Leylan District (Note: Renamed the Central District of Leylan County) was separated from Malekan County in the establishment of Leylan County and renamed the Central District. The new county was divided into two districts of two rural districts each, with Leylan as its capital and only city at the time.

== Demographics ==
=== Administrative divisions ===
Shirin Kand District
Administrative Divisions
Leylan-e Sharqi RD
Leylan-e Shomali RD
RD = Rural District
