= Leylan-e Jonubi Rural District =

Rural district in East Azerbaijan province, Iran

Leylan-e Jonubi Rural District Persian: دهستان ليلان جنوبي
- Rural District
- Location within Iran
- Coordinates: 37°00′N 46°13′E
- Country: Iran
- Province: East Azerbaijan
- County: Leylan
- District: Central
- Established: 1987
- Capital: Turchi

Population (2016)
  - Total: 14,853
- Time zone: UTC+3:30 (IRST)

Leylan-e Jonubi Rural District (Persian: دهستان ليلان جنوبي) (Note: Formerly Leylan Rural District (دهستان ليلان)) is in the Central District (Note: Formerly Leylan District of Malekan County) of Leylan County, East Azerbaijan province, Iran. Its capital is the village of Turchi. The rural district was previously administered from the city of Leylan.

== Demographics ==
=== Population ===
At the time of the 2006 National Census, the rural district's population (as a part of Leylan District (Note: Renamed the Central District in Leylan County) in Malekan County) was 13,317 in 3,015 households. There were 13,656 inhabitants in 3,713 households at the following census of 2011. The 2016 census measured the population of the rural district as 14,853 in 4,347 households. The most populous of its 14 villages was Shirin Kand (now the capital of Shirin Kand District), with 2,744 people.

=== Other villages in the rural district ===
- Hasanabad
- Mohsenabad
- Shariflu

In 2023, the district was separated from the county in the establishment of Leylan County and renamed the Central District.
