= Gavdul-e Sharqi Rural District =

Rural district in East Azerbaijan province, Iran

Gavdul-e Sharqi Rural District Persian: دهستان گاودول شرقي
- Rural District
- Location within Iran
- Coordinates: 37°11′N 46°17′E
- Country: Iran
- Province: East Azerbaijan
- County: Malekan
- District: Aq Manar
- Capital: Aq Manar

Population (2016)
  - Total: 7,468
- Time zone: UTC+3:30 (IRST)

Gavdul-e Sharqi Rural District (Persian: دهستان گاودول شرقي) is in Aq Manar District of Malekan County, East Azerbaijan province, Iran. Its capital is the village of Idahluy-e Bozorg. The previous capital of the rural district was the village of Aq Manar.

== Demographics ==
=== Population ===
At the time of the 2006 National Census, the rural district's population (as a part of the Central District) was 7,264 in 1,709 households. There were 7,492 inhabitants in 1,944 households at the following census of 2011. The 2016 census measured the population of the rural district as 7,468 in 2,306 households. The most populous of its 22 villages was Aq Manar, with 1,573 people.

=== Other villages in the rural district ===
- Baba Kalak
- Banayem
- Hapik Bolaghi
- Idahluy-e Kuchek
- Parchin Bolagh
- Qareh Chenaq
- Quzuchi Avin

In 2023, the rural district was separated from the district in the formation of Aq Manar District.
