= Aq Manar District =

District in East Azerbaijan province, Iran

Aq Manar District Persian: بخش آق‌منار
- District
- Location within Iran
- Coordinates: 37°10′N 46°15′E
- Country: Iran
- Province: East Azerbaijan
- County: Malekan
- Established: 2023
- Capital: Aq Manar
- Time zone: UTC+3:30 (IRST)

Aq Manar District (Persian: بخش آق‌منار) is in Malekan County, East Azerbaijan province, Iran. Its capital is the village of Aq Manar, whose population at the time of the 2016 National Census was 1,573 people in 514 households.

== History ==
In 2023, Gavdul-e Sharqi Rural District was separated from the Central District in the formation of Aq Manar District.

== Demographics ==
=== Administrative divisions ===
Aq Manar District
Administrative divisions
Gavdul-e Jonubi RD
Gavdul-e Sharqi RD
RD = Rural District
