= Leylan County =

County in East Azerbaijan province, Iran

Leylan County Persian: شهرستان لیلان
- County
- Location of Leylan County in East Azerbaijan province (bottom left, green)

- Location of East Azerbaijan province in Iran
- Coordinates: 37°02′N 46°16′E
- Country: Iran
- Province: East Azerbaijan
- Established: 2023
- Capital: Leylan
- Districts: Central, Shirin Kand
- Time zone: UTC+3:30 (IRST)

Leylan County (Persian: شهرستان لیلان) is in East Azerbaijan province, Iran. Its capital is the city of Leylan, whose population at the time of the 2016 National Census was 6,356 people in 1,943 households.

== History ==
In 2023, Leylan District (Note: Renamed the Central District of Leylan County) was separated from Malekan County in the establishment of Leylan County and renamed the Central District. The new county was divided into two districts of two rural districts each, with Leylan as its capital and only city at the time.

== Demographics ==
=== Administrative divisions ===
Leylan County's administrative structure is shown in the following table.

Leylan County
Administrative Divisions
Central District (Note: Formerly Leylan District of Malekan County)
Leylan-e Gharbi RD
Leylan-e Jonubi RD (Note: Formerly Leylan Rural District)
Leylan (city)
Shirin Kand District
Leylan-e Sharqi RD
Leylan-e Shomali RD
RD = Rural District

== See also ==
Media related to Leylan County at Wikimedia Commons
