= Central District (Leylan County) =

District in East Azerbaijan province, Iran

Central District (Leylan County) Persian: بخش مرکزی شهرستان لیلان
- District
- Location within Iran
- Coordinates: 37°00′N 46°11′E
- Country: Iran
- Province: East Azerbaijan
- County: Leylan
- Established: 1995
- Capital: Leylan

Population (2016)
  - Total: 25,381 (Note: As Leylan District of Malekan County)
- Time zone: UTC+3:30 (IRST)

The Central District of Leylan County (Persian: بخش مرکزی شهرستان لیلان) (Note: Formerly Leylan District (بخش لیلان) of Malekan County) is in East Azerbaijan province, Iran. Its capital is the city of Leylan.

== History ==
In 2023, Leylan District (Note: Renamed the Central District of Leylan County) was separated from Malekan County in the establishment of Leylan County and renamed the Central District. The new county was divided into two districts of two rural districts each, with Leylan as its capital and only city at the time.

== Demographics ==
=== Population ===
At the time of the 2006 National Census, the district's population (as Leylan District of Malekan County) was 23,234 in 5,341 households. The following census in 2011 counted 24,169 people in 6,688 households. The 2016 census measured the population of the district as 25,381 inhabitants in 7,526 households.

=== Administrative divisions ===
Central District (Leylan County) (Note: As Leylan District of Malekan County at the 2006, 2011, and 2016 censuses)
Administrative Divisions	2006	2011	2016
Leylan-e Gharbi RD (Note: Established after the 2016 census)			
Leylan-e Jonubi RD (Note: Formerly Leylan Rural District)	13,317	13,656	14,853
Leylan-e Shomali RD (Note: Transferred to Shirin Kand District after the 2016 census)	3,838	4,338	4,172
Leylan (city)	6,079	6,175	6,356
Total	23,234	24,169	25,381
RD = Rural District
