= Central District (Malekan County) =

District in East Azerbaijan province, Iran

Central District (Malekan County) Persian: بخش مرکزی شهرستان ملکان
- District
- Location within Iran
- Coordinates: 37°10′N 46°09′E
- Country: Iran
- Province: East Azerbaijan
- County: Malekan
- Established: 1995
- Capital: Malekan

Population (2016)
  - Total: 85,938
- Time zone: UTC+3:30 (IRST)

The Central District of Malekan County (Persian: بخش مرکزی شهرستان ملکان) is in East Azerbaijan province, Iran. Its capital is the city of Malekan.

== History ==
The village of Mobarakabad was elevated to city status as Mobarak Shahr in 2013. In 2023, Gavdul-e Sharqi Rural District was separated from the district in the formation of Aq Manar District.

== Demographics ==
=== Population ===
At the time of the 2006 National Census, the district's population was 77,132 in 19,482 households. The following census in 2011 counted 81,949 people in 23,019 households. The 2016 census measured the population of the district as 85,938 inhabitants in 26,072 households.

=== Administrative divisions ===
Central District (Malekan County) Population
Administrative Divisions	2006	2011	2016
Gavdul-e Gharbi RD	19,256	20,762	17,573
Gavdul-e Markazi RD	26,623	28,383	29,010
Gavdul-e Sharqi RD (Note: Transferred to Aq Manar District after the 2016 census)	7,264	7,492	7,468
Malekan (city)	23,989	25,312	27,431
Mobarak Shahr (city) (Note: Formerly the village of Mobarakabad)			4,456
Total	77,132	81,949	85,938
RD = Rural District
