= Malekan County =

County in East Azerbaijan province, Iran

Malekan County Persian: شهرستان ملکان
- County
- Location of Malekan County in East Azerbaijan province (bottom left, pink)

- Location of East Azerbaijan province in Iran
- Coordinates: 37°06′N 46°12′E
- Country: Iran
- Province: East Azerbaijan
- Established: 1995
- Capital: Malekan
- Districts: Central, Aq Manar

Population (2016)
  - Total: 111,319
- Time zone: UTC+3:30 (IRST)

Malekan County (Persian: شهرستان ملکان) is in East Azerbaijan province, Iran. Its capital is the city of Malekan. The county is one of the most productive regions for grapes in Iran.

== Etymology ==
The word Malekan is derived from Malek Kandi, "the village of the king." However, there are various theories pertaining to the origin of the name "Malekan Kandi". The first hypothesis is that because the grounds were owned by the Qajars, the city had been named after the founder and king of the dynasty. The second conjecture holds that because there have been several kings that have come and gone in the past, it has been named this way. The third and the last supposition is that the name Malek Kandi is derived from the name of a king named Maleknia.

== History ==
In 2013, the village of Mobarakabad was elevated to city status as Mobarak Shahr.

In 2023, Leylan District (Note: Renamed the Central District of Leylan County) was separated from the county in the establishment of Leylan County and renamed the Central District. At the same time, Gavdul-e Sharqi Rural District was separated from the Central District in the formation of Aq Manar District, including the new Gavdul-e Jonubi Rural District.

== Demographics ==
=== Population ===
At the time of the 2006 National Census, the county's population was 100,366 in 24,823 households. The following census in 2011 counted 106,118 people in 29,686 households. The 2016 census measured the population of the county as 111,319 in 33,598 households.

=== Administrative divisions ===
Malekan County's population history and administrative structure over three consecutive censuses are shown in the following table.

Malekan County Population
Administrative Divisions	2006	2011	2016
Central District	77,132	81,949	85,938
Gavdul-e Gharbi RD	19,256	20,762	17,573
Gavdul-e Markazi RD	26,623	28,383	29,010
Gavdul-e Sharqi RD	7,264	7,492	7,468
Malekan (city)	23,989	25,312	27,431
Mobarak Shahr (city) (Note: Formerly the village of Mobarakabad)			4,456
Aq Manar District (Note: Established after the 2016 census)			
Gavdul-e Jonubi RD			
Gavdul-e Sharqi RD			
Leylan District (Note: Transferred to Leylan County after the 2016 census and renamed the Central District)	23,234	24,169	25,381
Leylan-e Jonubi RD (Note: Formerly Leylan Rural District)	13,317	13,656	14,853
Leylan-e Shomali RD	3,838	4,338	4,172
Leylan (city)	6,079	6,175	6,356
Total	100,366	106,118	111,319
RD = Rural District

== See also ==
Media related to Malekan County at Wikimedia Commons
