= Cheraghil =

Jaraghil جراغيل
- Village
- Location within Iran
- Coordinates: 37°44′23″N 46°07′38″E
- Country: Iran
- Province: East Azerbaijan
- County: Azarshahr
- Bakhsh: Howmeh
- Rural District: Yengejeh

Population (2006)
  - Total: 390
- Time zone: UTC+3:30 (IRST)
  - Summer (DST): UTC+4:30 (IRDT)

Jaraghil (Persian: چراغيل, also Romanized as Jarāghīl; also known as Jerāghīl) is a village in Yengejeh Rural District, Howmeh District, Azarshahr County, East Azerbaijan Province, Iran. At the 2006 census, its population was 390, in 103 families. The village is located in the West Village Historic majarshin.
