= Qermezi Gol =

Qermezi Gol قرمزی‌گل
- Village
- Location within Iran
- Coordinates: 37°43′18″N 46°05′03″E
- Country: Iran
- Province: East Azerbaijan
- County: Azarshahr
- Bakhsh: Howmeh
- Rural District: Yengejeh

Population (2006)
  - Total: 269
- Time zone: UTC+3:30 (IRST)
  - Summer (DST): UTC+4:30 (IRDT)

Qermezi Gol (Persian: قرمزی‌گل, also Romanized as Qermezī Gol; also known as Qermezgol and Qermez Gol) is a village in Yengejeh Rural District, Howmeh District, Azarshahr County, East Azerbaijan Province, Iran. At the 2006 census, its population was 269, in 61 families.
