= Jameh Mosque of Gugan =

Shi'ite mosque in Gugan, Azarshahr, Iran

- مسجد جامع گوگان
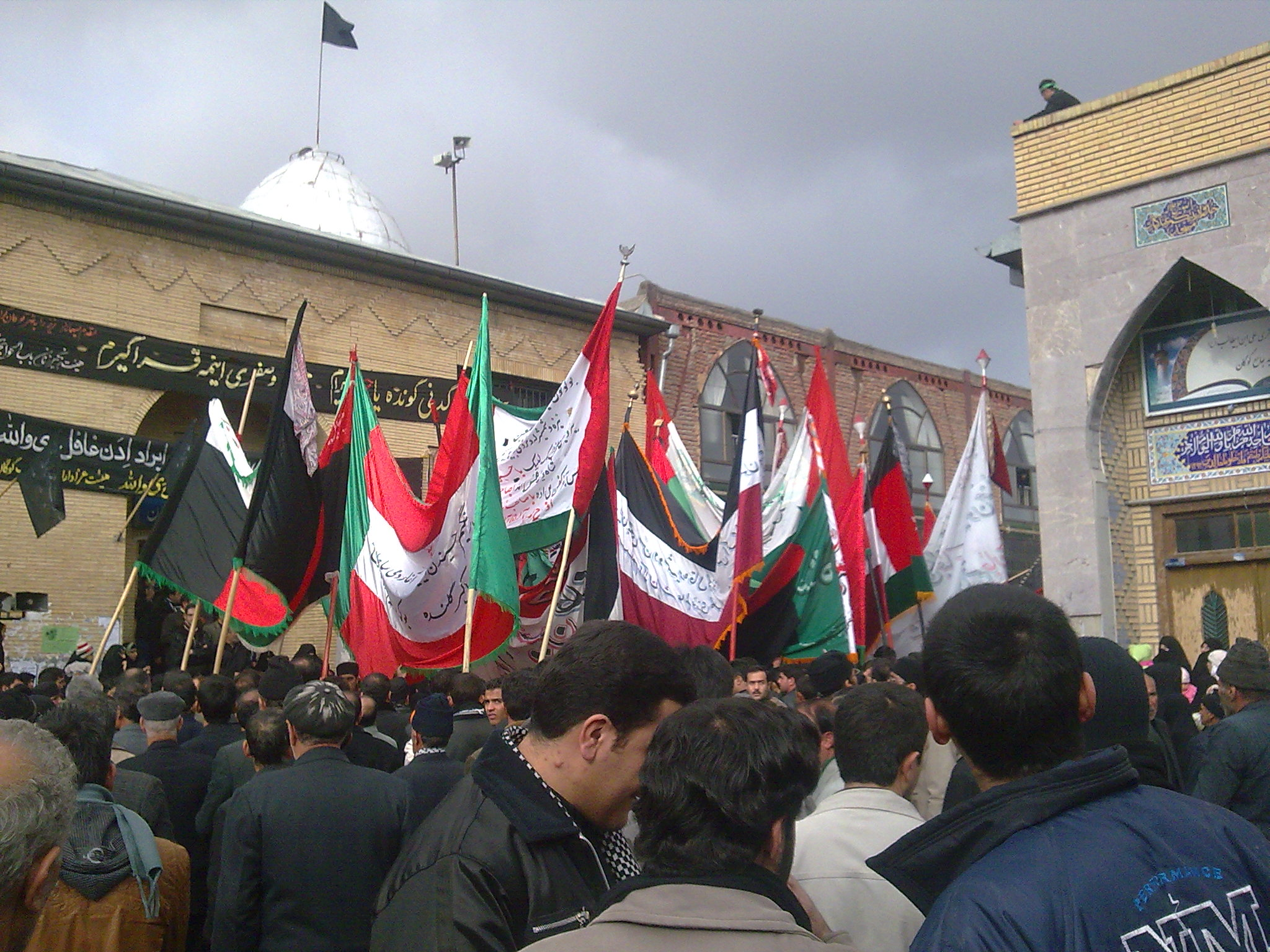

Religion
- Affiliation: Shia Islam
- Ecclesiastical or organizational status: Friday mosque
- Status: Active

Location
- Location: Gugan, Gugan District, Azarshahr County, East Azerbaijan province

Architecture
- Type: Mosque architecture
- Style: Qajar

Iran National Heritage List
- Official name: Jameh Mosque of Gugan
- Type: Built
- Designated: 8 March 2009
- Reference no.: 25184
- Conservation organization: Cultural Heritage, Handicrafts and Tourism Organization of Iran

The Jameh Mosque of Gugan (Persian: مسجد جامع گوگان; Arabic: جامع غوغان) is a Friday mosque, located on the square of namaz, in the city of Gugan, in the Gugan District, in Azarshahr County, in the province of East Azerbaijan, Iran. The mosque was completed during the Qajar era.

The mosque was added to the Iran National Heritage List on 8 March 2009 and is administered by the Cultural Heritage, Handicrafts and Tourism Organization of Iran.

== See also ==
- List of mosques in Iran
- Shia Islam in Iran
