= Gavaher =

Gavaher گواهر
- Village
- Location within Iran
- Coordinates: 37°42′57″N 46°02′22″E
- Country: Iran
- Province: East Azerbaijan
- County: Azarshahr
- Bakhsh: Howmeh
- Rural District: Yengejeh

Population (2006)
  - Total: 158
- Time zone: UTC+3:30 (IRST)
  - Summer (DST): UTC+4:30 (IRDT)

Gavaher (Persian: گواهر, also Romanized as Gavāher; also known as Gavāhīr) is a village in Yengejeh Rural District, Howmeh District, Azarshahr County, East Azerbaijan Province, Iran. At the 2006 census, its population was 158, in 31 families.
