= Pirchupan =

Pirchupan پيرچوپان
- Village
- Location within Iran
- Coordinates: 37°38′14″N 45°53′58″E
- Country: Iran
- Province: East Azerbaijan
- County: Azarshahr
- Bakhsh: Howmeh
- Rural District: Shiramin

Population (2006)
  - Total: 269
- Time zone: UTC+3:30 (IRST)
  - Summer (DST): UTC+4:30 (IRDT)

Pirchupan (Persian: پيرچوپان, also Romanized as Pīrchūpān) is a village in Shiramin Rural District, Howmeh District, Azarshahr County, East Azerbaijan Province, Iran. At the 2006 census, its population was 269, in 73 families.
