= Zinatlu =

Zinatlu زينتلو
- Village
- Location within Iran
- Coordinates: 37°37′10″N 45°43′09″E
- Country: Iran
- Province: East Azerbaijan
- County: Azarshahr
- Bakhsh: Howmeh
- Rural District: Shiramin

Population (2006)
  - Total: 306
- Time zone: UTC+3:30 (IRST)
  - Summer (DST): UTC+4:30 (IRDT)

Zinatlu (Persian: زينتلو, also Romanized as Zīnatlū) is a village in Shiramin Rural District, Howmeh District, Azarshahr County, East Azerbaijan Province, Iran. At the 2006 census, its population was 306, in 60 families.
