= Bavil =

Bavil (Persian: باويل) may refer to:

- Bavil-e Olya
- Bavil-e Sofla
- Bavil Rural District
