= Silab =

Silab, Silabs or Seylab or Seilab or Sailab (Persian: سيلاب) may refer to:

- Seylab, East Azerbaijan
- Silab, Kohgiluyeh and Boyer-Ahmad
- Seylab, Kurdistan
- Silab, West Azerbaijan
- Silicon Labs, a fabless manufacturer of semiconductors
- Sailab-cheni, portable wash basin in India

== See also ==
- Sailaab (disambiguation)
