= Kukhalu =

Kukhalu (Persian: كوخالو) may refer to:

- Kukhalu, Azarshahr
- Kukhalu, Bostanabad
