= Uch Tappeh, East Azerbaijan =

Village in East Azerbaijan, Iran

Uch Tappeh اوچ تپه
- Village
- Location within Iran
- Coordinates: 37°45′44″N 46°11′13″E
- Country: Iran
- Province: East Azerbaijan
- County: Osku
- Bakhsh: Central
- Rural District: Gonbar

Population (2006)
  - Total: 70
- Time zone: UTC+3:30 (IRST)
  - Summer (DST): UTC+4:30 (IRDT)

Uch Tappeh (Persian: اوچ تپه, also Romanized as Ūch Tappeh) is a village in Gonbar Rural District, in the Central District of Osku County, East Azerbaijan Province, Iran. At the 2006 census, its population was 70, in 17 families.
