= Khaslu =

Village in East Azerbaijan province, Iran

Khaslu Persian: خاصلو
- Village
- Location within Iran
- Coordinates: 37°47′39″N 45°52′49″E
- Country: Iran
- Province: East Azerbaijan
- County: Azarshahr
- District: Gugan
- Rural District: Teymurlu

Population (2016)
  - Total: 950
- Time zone: UTC+3:30 (IRST)

Khaslu (Persian: خاصلو) (Note: Also romanized as Khāşlū and Khāşşelū) is a village in Teymurlu Rural District (Note: Formerly Qazi Jahan Rural District) of Gugan District in Azarshahr County, East Azerbaijan province, Iran.

== Demographics ==
=== Population ===
At the time of the 2006 National Census, the village's population was 975 in 283 households. The following census in 2011 counted 938 people in 307 households. The 2016 census measured the population of the village as 950 people in 313 households.
