= Khanamir =

Village in East Azerbaijan province, Iran

Khanamir Persian: خان مير
- Village
- Location within Iran
- Coordinates: 37°46′39″N 45°59′34″E
- Country: Iran
- Province: East Azerbaijan
- County: Azarshahr
- District: Howmeh
- Rural District: Yengejeh

Population (2016)
  - Total: 2,381
- Time zone: UTC+3:30 (IRST)

Khanamir (Persian: خان مير) (Note: Also romanized as Khān Amīr and Khānamīr) is a village in Yengejeh Rural District of Howmeh District in Azarshahr County, East Azerbaijan province, Iran. It was the capital of Khanamir Rural District (Note: Renamed Shahrak Rural District) until its administration was transferred to the city of Mamqan.

== Demographics ==
=== Population ===
At the time of the 2006 National Census, the village's population was 1,803 in 449 households. The following census in 2011 counted 2,239 people in 637 households. The 2016 census measured the population of the village as 2,381 people in 723 households. It was the most populous village in its rural district.
