= Qeshlaq-e Piazi =

Village in East Azerbaijan province, Iran

Qeshlaq-e Piazi Persian: قشلاق پیازی
- Village
- Location within Iran
- Coordinates: 37°46′23″N 45°52′16″E
- Country: Iran
- Province: East Azerbaijan
- County: Azarshahr
- District: Gugan
- Rural District: Dastjerd

Population (2016)
  - Total: 705
- Time zone: UTC+3:30 (IRST)

Qeshlaq-e Piazi (Persian: قشلاق پیازی) (Note: Also romanized as Qeshlāq-e Pīāzī; also known as Qeshlāq) is a village in Dastjerd Rural District of Gugan District in Azarshahr County, East Azerbaijan province, Iran.

== Demographics ==
=== Population ===
At the time of the 2006 National Census, the village's population was 732 in 179 households. The following census in 2011 counted 717 people in 227 households. The 2016 census measured the population of the village as 705 people in 215 households.
