= Qadamgah, East Azerbaijan =

Village in East Azerbaijan province, Iran

Qadamgah Persian: قدمگاه
- Village
- Location within Iran
- Coordinates: 37°40′59″N 46°00′37″E
- Country: Iran
- Province: East Azerbaijan
- County: Azarshahr
- District: Howmeh
- Rural District: Qebleh Daghi

Population (2016)
  - Total: 409
- Time zone: UTC+3:30 (IRST)

Qadamgah (Persian: قدمگاه) (Note: Also romanized as Qadamgāh; also known as Bādām Yār (بادام يار) and Bādāmyār (باداميار)) is a village in Qebleh Daghi Rural District of Howmeh District in Azarshahr County, East Azerbaijan province, Iran.

== Demographics ==
=== Population ===
At the time of the 2006 National Census, the village's population was 589 in 141 households. The following census in 2011 counted 492 people in 137 households. The 2016 census measured the population of the village as 409 people in 132 households.
