= Akhi Jahan =

Village in East Azerbaijan province, Iran

Akhi Jahan Persian: آخی‌جهان
- Village
- Location within Iran
- Coordinates: 37°47′19″N 45°56′45″E
- Country: Iran
- Province: East Azerbaijan
- County: Azarshahr
- District: Howmeh
- Rural District: Qazi Jahan

Population (2016)
  - Total: 2,424
- Time zone: UTC+3:30 (IRST)

Akhi Jahan (Persian: آخی‌جهان) (Note: Also romanized as Ākhī Jahān and Akhījahān; also known as Ākhar-e Jahān) is a village in Qazi Jahan Rural District in Howmeh District of Azarshahr County of East Azerbaijan province, Iran.

== Demographics ==
=== Population ===
At the time of the 2006 National Census, the village's population was 2,290 in 589 households. The following census in 2011 counted 2,481 people in 766 households. The 2016 census measured the population of the village as 2,424 people in 775 households.
