= Dinabad =

Dinabad (Persian: دين آباد) may refer to:

- Dinabad, East Azerbaijan
- Dinabad, Hormozgan
