= Dastjerd, Azarshahr =

Village in East Azerbaijan province, Iran

Dastjerd Persian: دستجرد
- Village
- Location within Iran
- Coordinates: 37°45′25″N 45°53′50″E
- Country: Iran
- Province: East Azerbaijan
- County: Azarshahr
- District: Gugan
- Rural District: Dastjerd

Population (2016)
  - Total: 1,608
- Time zone: UTC+3:30 (IRST)

Dastjerd (Persian: دستجرد) is a village in, and the capital of, Dastjerd Rural District in Gugan District of Azarshahr County, East Azerbaijan province, Iran.

== Demographics ==
=== Population ===
At the time of the 2006 National Census, the village's population was 1,595 in 427 households. The following census in 2011 counted 1,683 people in 533 households. The 2016 census measured the population of the village as 1,608 people in 519 households.
