= Qaraghil =

Village in East Azerbaijan province, Iran

Qaraghil Persian: قراغيل
- Village
- Location within Iran
- Coordinates: 37°48′45″N 45°54′44″E
- Country: Iran
- Province: East Azerbaijan
- County: Azarshahr
- District: Gugan
- Rural District: Teymurlu

Population (2016)
  - Total: 1,723
- Time zone: UTC+3:30 (IRST)

Qaraghil (Persian: قراغيل) (Note: Also romanized as Qarāghīl) is a village in Teymurlu Rural District (Note: Formerly Qazi Jahan Rural District) of Gugan District in Azarshahr County, East Azerbaijan province, Iran.

== Demographics ==
=== Population ===
At the time of the 2006 National Census, the village's population was 1,527 in 332 households. The following census in 2011 counted 1,638 people in 482 households. The 2016 census measured the population of the village as 1,723 people in 478 households. It was the most populous village in its rural district.
