= Shiramin =

Village in East Azerbaijan province, Iran

Shiramin Persian: شیرامین
- Village
- Location within Iran
- Coordinates: 37°38′25″N 45°52′05″E
- Country: Iran
- Province: East Azerbaijan
- County: Azarshahr
- District: Howmeh
- Rural District: Shiramin

Population (2016)
  - Total: 3,282
- Time zone: UTC+3:30 (IRST)

Shiramin (Persian: شیرامین) (Note: Also romanized as Shīr Amīn and Shīrāmīn) is a village in, and the capital of, Shiramin Rural District in Howmeh District of Azarshahr County, East Azerbaijan province, Iran.

== Demographics ==
=== Population ===
At the time of the 2006 National Census, the village's population was 3,280 in 909 households. The following census in 2011 counted 3,406 people in 1,010 households. The 2016 census measured the population of the village as 3,282 people in 1,057 households. It was the most populous village in its rural district.
