= Seghayesh =

Village in East Azerbaijan province, Iran

Seghayesh Persian: صغايش
- Village
- Location within Iran
- Coordinates: 37°43′56″N 46°06′07″E
- Country: Iran
- Province: East Azerbaijan
- County: Azarshahr
- District: Howmeh
- Rural District: Yengejeh

Population (2016)
  - Total: 604
- Time zone: UTC+3:30 (IRST)

Seghayesh (Persian: صغايش) (Note: Also romanized as Şeghāyesh) is a village in Yengejeh Rural District of Howmeh District in Azarshahr County, East Azerbaijan province, Iran.

== Demographics ==
=== Population ===
At the time of the 2006 National Census, the village's population was 660 in 159 households. The following census in 2011 counted 652 people in 188 households. The 2016 census measured the population of the village as 604 people in 187 households.
