= Qaleh-ye Sheykh, East Azerbaijan =

Village in East Azerbaijan province, Iran

Qaleh-ye Sheykh Persian: قلعه شيخ
- Village
- Location within Iran
- Coordinates: 37°46′20″N 45°52′39″E
- Country: Iran
- Province: East Azerbaijan
- County: Azarshahr
- District: Gugan
- Rural District: Dastjerd

Population (2016)
  - Total: 166
- Time zone: UTC+3:30 (IRST)

Qaleh-ye Sheykh (Persian: قلعه شيخ) (Note: Also romanized as Qal‘eh-ye Sheykh; also known as Qal‘eh) is a village in Dastjerd Rural District of Gugan District in Azarshahr County, East Azerbaijan province, Iran.

== Demographics ==
=== Population ===
At the time of the 2006 National Census, the village's population was 196 in 53 households. The following census in 2011 counted 208 people in 61 households. The 2016 census measured the population of the village as 166 people in 58 households.
