= Dizaj-e Aqa Hasan =

Village in East Azerbaijan province, Iran

Dizaj-e Aqa Hasan Persian: ديزج اقاحسن
- Village
- Location within Iran
- Coordinates: 37°46′16″N 45°57′01″E
- Country: Iran
- Province: East Azerbaijan
- County: Azarshahr
- District: Howmeh
- Rural District: Qazi Jahan

Population (2016)
  - Total: 153
- Time zone: UTC+3:30 (IRST)

Dizaj-e Aqa Hasan (Persian: ديزج اقاحسن) (Note: Also romanized as Dīzaj-e Āqā Ḩasan; also known as Dīzaj-e Āqā Ḩoseyn) is a village in Qazi Jahan Rural District in Howmeh District of Azarshahr County of East Azerbaijan province, Iran.

== Demographics ==
=== Population ===
At the time of the 2006 National Census, the village's population was 237 in 66 households. The following census in 2011 counted 257 people in 78 households. The 2016 census measured the population of the village as 153 people in 53 households.
