= Dashkasan, Azarshahr =

Village in East Azerbaijan province, Iran

Dashkasan Persian: داشكسن
- Village
- Location within Iran
- Coordinates: 37°39′28″N 45°50′26″E
- Country: Iran
- Province: East Azerbaijan
- County: Azarshahr
- District: Howmeh
- Rural District: Shiramin

Population (2016)
  - Total: 452
- Time zone: UTC+3:30 (IRST)

Dashkasan (Persian: داشكسن) (Note: Also romanized as Dāshkasan) is a village in Shiramin Rural District of Howmeh District in Azarshahr County, East Azerbaijan province, Iran.

== Demographics ==
=== Population ===
At the time of the 2006 National Census, the village's population was 447 in 117 households. The following census in 2011 counted 454 people in 138 households. The 2016 census measured the population of the village as 452 people in 139 households.
