= Khaneqah, Azarshahr =

Village in East Azerbaijan province, Iran

Khaneqah Persian: خانقاه
- Village
- Location within Iran
- Coordinates: 37°37′30″N 45°49′20″E
- Country: Iran
- Province: East Azerbaijan
- County: Azarshahr
- District: Howmeh
- Rural District: Shiramin

Population (2016)
  - Total: 1,060
- Time zone: UTC+3:30 (IRST)

Khaneqah (Persian: خانقاه) (Note: Also romanized as Khānaqāh, Khāneqāh, and Khānqāh; also known as Khaneghah and Khanagya) is a village in Shiramin Rural District of Howmeh District in Azarshahr County, East Azerbaijan province, Iran.

== Demographics ==
=== Population ===
At the time of the 2006 National Census, the village's population was 1,388 in 370 households. The following census in 2011 counted 1,261 people in 374 households. The 2016 census measured the population of the village as 1,060 people in 359 households.
