= Amir Dizaj =

Village in East Azerbaijan province, Iran

Amir Dizaj Persian: اميرديزج
- Village
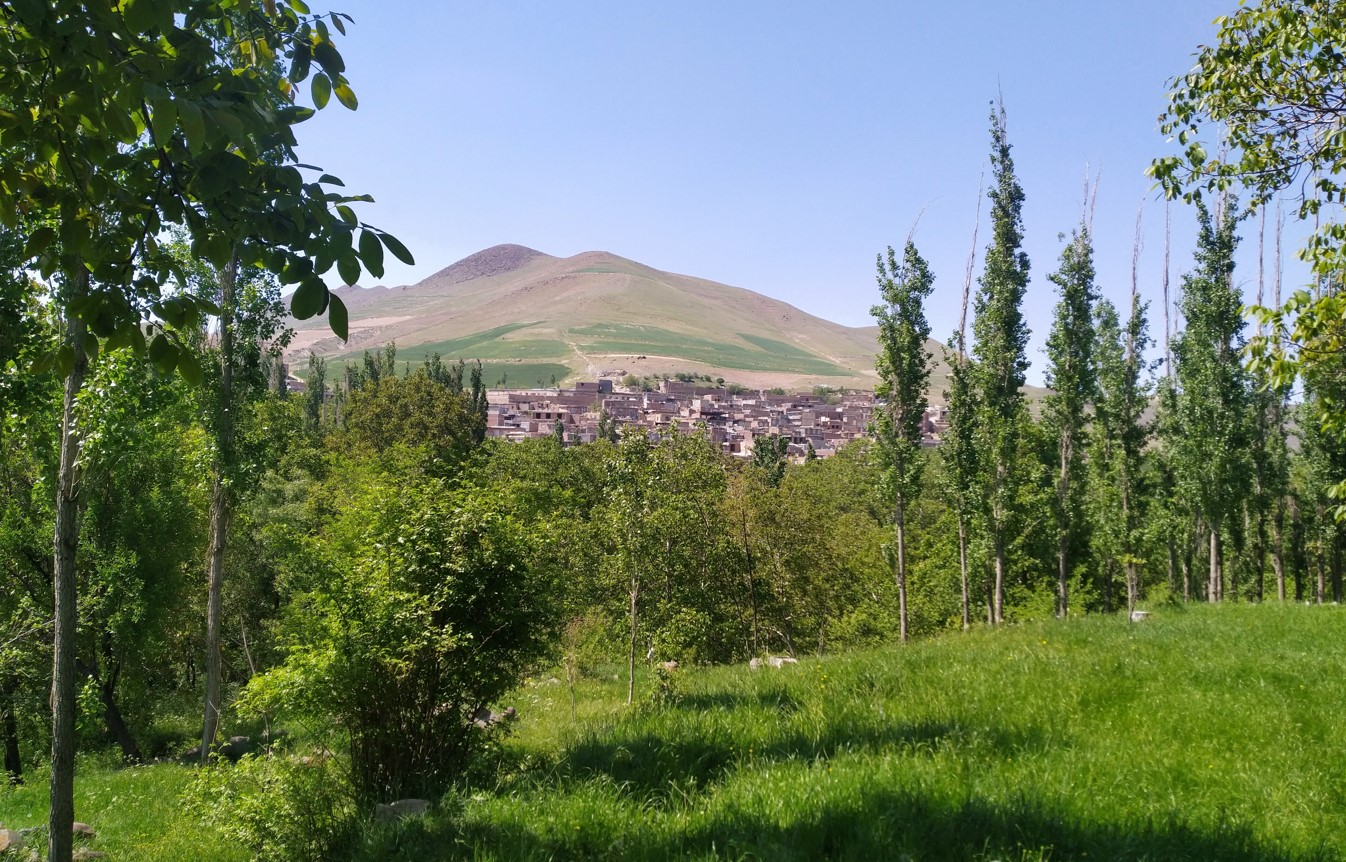
- The village of Amir Dizaj

- Location within Iran
- Coordinates: 37°40′01″N 46°03′07″E
- Country: Iran
- Province: East Azerbaijan
- County: Azarshahr
- District: Howmeh
- Rural District: Qebleh Daghi

Population (2016)
  - Total: 999
- Time zone: UTC+3:30 (IRST)

Amir Dizaj (Persian: اميرديزج) (Note: Also romanized as Amīr Dīzaj and Amīrdīzaj; also known as Ālā Kūzeh (الا کوزه) and Ālāgūzeh) is a village in Qebleh Daghi Rural District of Howmeh District in Azarshahr County, East Azerbaijan province, Iran.

== Demographics ==
=== Population ===
At the time of the 2006 National Census, the village's population was 1,018 in 188 households. The following census in 2011 counted 1,054 people in 228 households. The 2016 census measured the population of the village as 999 people in 253 households.
