= Qandilu =

Qandilu قنديلو
- Village
- Location within Iran
- Coordinates: 37°47′59″N 46°10′25″E
- Country: Iran
- Province: East Azerbaijan
- County: Osku
- Bakhsh: Central
- Rural District: Gonbar

Population (2006)
  - Total: 105
- Time zone: UTC+3:30 (IRST)
  - Summer (DST): UTC+4:30 (IRDT)

Qandilu (Persian: قنديلو, also Romanized as Qandīlū) is a village in Gonbar Rural District, in the Central District of Osku County, East Azerbaijan Province, Iran. At the 2006 census, its population was 105, in 26 families.
