= Ashestan =

Ashestan اشستان
- Village
- Location within Iran
- Coordinates: 37°47′30″N 46°12′49″E
- Country: Iran
- Province: East Azerbaijan
- County: Osku
- Bakhsh: Central
- Rural District: Gonbar

Population (2006)
  - Total: 146
- Time zone: UTC+3:30 (IRST)
  - Summer (DST): UTC+4:30 (IRDT)

Ashestan (Persian: اشستان, also Romanized as Āshestān; also known as Āshīstān) is a village in Gonbar Rural District, in the Central District of Osku County, East Azerbaijan Province, Iran. At the 2006 census, its population was 146, in 33 families.
