= Alvanaq =

Village in East Azerbaijan province, Iran

Alvanaq Persian: الوانق
- Village
- Location within Iran
- Coordinates: 37°35′36″N 45°54′18″E
- Country: Iran
- Province: East Azerbaijan
- County: Azarshahr
- District: Howmeh
- Rural District: Shiramin

Population (2016)
  - Total: 512
- Time zone: UTC+3:30 (IRST)

Alvanaq (Persian: الوانق) (Note: Also romanized as Alvānaq) is a village in Shiramin Rural District of Howmeh District in Azarshahr County, East Azerbaijan province, Iran.

== Demographics ==
=== Population ===
At the time of the 2006 National Census, the village's population was 555 in 173 households. The following census in 2011 counted 519 people in 182 households. The 2016 census measured the population of the village as 512 people in 178 households.
