= Firuz Salar =

Village in East Azerbaijan province, Iran

Firuz Salar Persian: فيروزسالار
- Village
- Location within Iran
- Coordinates: 37°47′21″N 45°55′57″E
- Country: Iran
- Province: East Azerbaijan
- County: Azarshahr
- District: Gugan
- Rural District: Dastjerd

Population (2016)
  - Total: 2,582
- Time zone: UTC+3:30 (IRST)

Firuz Salar (Persian: فيروزسالار) (Note: Also romanized as Fīrūz Sālār) is a village in Dastjerd Rural District of Gugan District in Azarshahr County, East Azerbaijan province, Iran.

== Demographics ==
=== Population ===
At the time of the 2006 National Census, the village's population was 2,405 in 626 households. The following census in 2011 counted 2,924 people in 869 households. The 2016 census measured the population of the village as 2,582 people in 839 households. It was the most populous village in its rural district.
