= Haft Cheshmeh, Azarshahr =

Village in East Azerbaijan province, Iran

Haft Cheshmeh Persian: هفت چشمه
- Village
- Location within Iran
- Coordinates: 37°38′07″N 45°57′31″E
- Country: Iran
- Province: East Azerbaijan
- County: Azarshahr
- District: Howmeh
- Rural District: Qebleh Daghi

Population (2016)
  - Total: 1,526
- Time zone: UTC+3:30 (IRST)

Haft Cheshmeh (Persian: هفت چشمه) (Note: Also known as Gaftracheshma, Guftachashmeh, and Haft Chāshmeh) is a village in Qebleh Daghi Rural District of Howmeh District in Azarshahr County, East Azerbaijan province, Iran.

== Demographics ==
=== Population ===
At the time of the 2006 National Census, the village's population was 1,755 in 387 households. The following census in 2011 counted 1,671 people in 441 households. The 2016 census measured the population of the village as 1,526 people in 460 households.
