= Teymurlu =

Teymurlu or Teimoor Loo (Persian: تيمورلو) may refer to:

- Teymurlu, Azarshahr, East Azerbaijan Province
- Teymurlu, Osku, East Azerbaijan Province
- Teymurlu, Zanjan
- Teymurlu Rural District, in East Azerbaijan Province
