= Yengejeh, Azarshahr =

Village in East Azerbaijan province, Iran

Yengejeh Persian: ینگجه
- Village
- Location within Iran
- Coordinates: 37°45′29″N 46°00′32″E
- Country: Iran
- Province: East Azerbaijan
- County: Azarshahr
- District: Howmeh
- Rural District: Yengejeh

Population (2016)
  - Total: 2,119
- Time zone: UTC+3:30 (IRST)

Yengejeh (Persian: ینگجه) (Note: Also known as Engija, Engijeh, and Yengījeh) is a village in, and the capital of, Yengejeh Rural District in Howmeh District of Azarshahr County, East Azerbaijan province, Iran.

== Demographics ==
=== Population ===
At the time of the 2006 National Census, the village's population was 2,190 in 599 households. The following census in 2011 counted 2,056 people in 630 households. The 2016 census measured the population of the village as 2,119 people in 667 households.
