= Kordabad, East Azerbaijan =

Village in East Azerbaijan province, Iran

Kordabad Persian: كرداباد
- Village
- Location within Iran
- Coordinates: 37°43′35″N 46°11′02″E
- Country: Iran
- Province: East Azerbaijan
- County: Osku
- District: Central
- Rural District: Gonbar

Population (2016)
  - Total: 2,396
- Time zone: UTC+3:30 (IRST)

Kordabad (Persian: كرداباد) (Note: Also romanized as Kordābād; also known as Kordūr) is a village in Gonbar Rural District of the Central District in Osku County, East Azerbaijan province, Iran.

== Demographics ==
=== Population ===
At the time of the 2006 National Census, the village's population was 2,150 in 410 households. The following census in 2011 counted 2,379 people in 653 households. The 2016 census measured the population of the village as 2,396 people in 679 households.
