= Arbat, Osku =

Village in East Azerbaijan province, Iran

Arbat Persian: اربط
- Village
- Location within Iran
- Coordinates: 37°46′32″N 46°07′30″E
- Country: Iran
- Province: East Azerbaijan
- County: Osku
- District: Central
- Rural District: Gonbar

Population (2016)
  - Total: 391
- Time zone: UTC+3:30 (IRST)

Arbat (Persian: اربط) (Note: Also romanized as Arbaţ; also known as Arbad) is a village in, and the capital of, Gonbar Rural District in the Central District of Osku County, East Azerbaijan province, Iran.

== Demographics ==
=== Population ===
At the time of the 2006 National Census, the village's population was 442 in 112 households. The following census in 2011 counted 399 people in 114 households. The 2016 census measured the population of the village as 391 people in 129 households.
