= 2019 Iran floods =

2019 flash floods across Iran

2019 Iran Floods
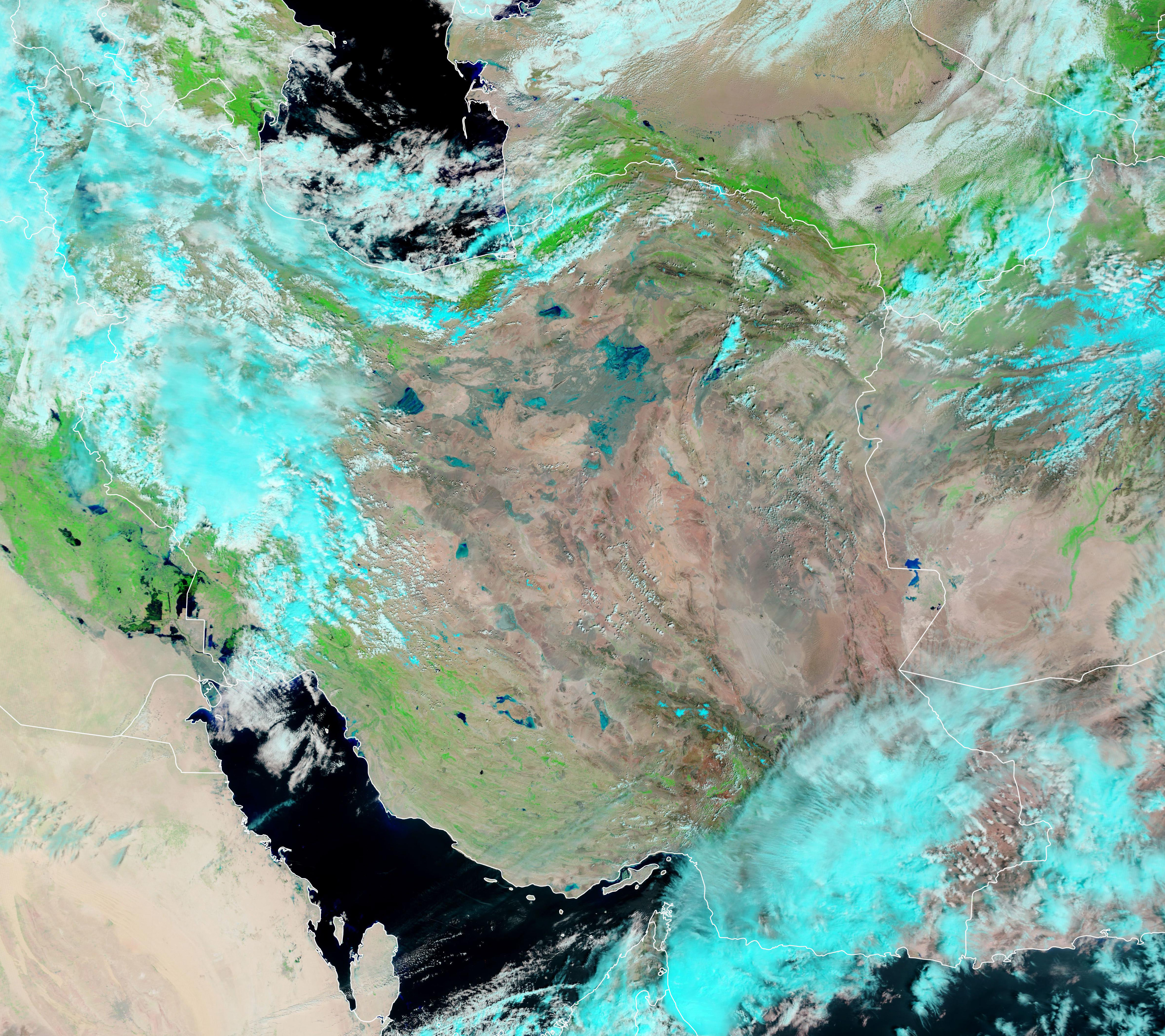
- Date: 19 March 2019 – 29 April 2019
- Location: Fars province Golestan province Mazandaran province Khuzestan province Lorestan province Ilam province and 20 other provinces.
- Deaths: 77+ deaths, 791 injured,
- Property damage: $4.1 billion (2019 USD): About 1,900 cities and villages damaged; 78 roads had been blocked and 84 bridges in flood-stricken areas affected

From mid-March to April 2019 widespread flash flooding affected large parts of Iran, most severely in Golestan, Fars, Khuzestan, Lorestan, and other provinces. Iran has been hit by three major waves of rain and flooding over the course of two weeks which led to flooding in at least 26 of Iran's 31 provinces and at least 70 people died nationwide as of 6 April, according to the officials. The first wave of rain began on 17 March, leading to flooding in two northern provinces, Golestan and Mazandaran with the former province receiving as much as 70 percent of its average annual rainfall in single day. Several large dams have been overflowed, particularly in Khuzestan and Golestan, therefore many villages and several cities have been evacuated. About 1,900 cities and villages across country have been damaged by severe floods as well as hundreds of millions of dollars of damage to water and agriculture infrastructure. 78 roads were blocked and the reliability of 84 bridges was questioned.

Severity of the floods was greatly increased by converting flood routes and dry river beds for urban development without providing proper drainage infrastructure. According to an Iranian official, due to record rainfalls, more than 140 rivers have burst their banks and about 409 landslides have happened in the country. The impact of the floods was heightened because of the Nowruz holiday; many Iranians were traveling and many deaths occurred due to flash flooding on roads and highways. Around 12,000 km of roads were damaged by the flooding, about 36% of Iran's national road network. The floods caused US$4.1 billion in damages, in which US$1.5 billion was the agricultural damage. Further, according to Red Crescent, two million people are in need of humanitarian aid due to the devastating floods.

Civil and armed forces have been mobilized since 24 March after the command of Ali Khamenei, Iran's Supreme Leader, and vice President, Eshaq Jahangiri, along with several ministers as well as army commanders have traveled to the areas affected by floods. However, the lack of government aid and delayed response at the first days quickly heightened political tensions throughout the nation. Many Iranians including politicians took to social media platforms to criticize the handling of the floods by the government, specifically President Hassan Rouhani. Civilian outrage ultimately led to deadly clashes between protesters and government soldiers. The floods prompted a large outcry against the government rule which was perceived as worsening the floods through destructive measures such as the destruction of natural plant coverage, obstruction of flood outlets, and converting flood routes and dry river beds to residential areas following the Islamic Revolution.

== Locations ==
=== Golestan and Mazandaran ===
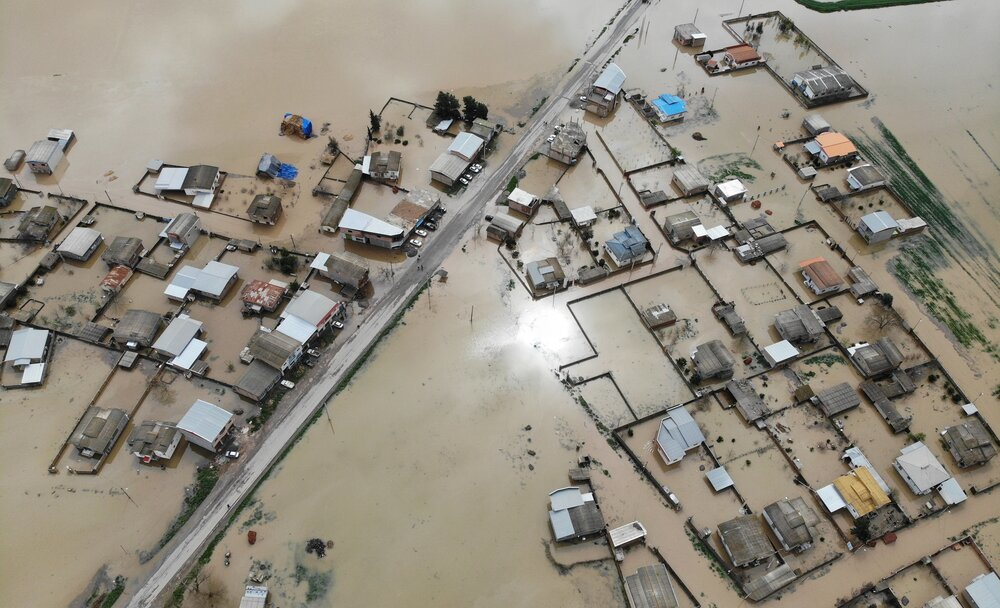
Flooding in Aqqala, Golestan

On 20 March 2019, massive rainfall in the two provinces of Golestan and Mazandaran in Iran brought about heavy flooding. These floods resulted in financial damages to the people living in these areas and also the deaths of two children. State-run media reports indicated that flash floods had surfaced in 70 villages in Golestan and more than 200 villages in Mazandaran. Iran's Minister of Energy also reported that 360 villages in Golestan province and 193 villages in Mazandaran province had lost electricity due to floods. Coincident with Iran's national holiday, Nowruz.

The first wave of rain began on 17 March, leading to flooding in two northern provinces, Golestan and Mazandaran with the former province receiving as much as 70 percent of its average annual rainfall in a single day. Several large dams have overflowed, particularly in Khuzestan and Golestan, therefore, many villages and several cities were evacuated. In many areas, homes and lands have been partially or totally submerged for several days. Portions of Golestan province received 50-70 percent of their average annual rainfall over a five-day period. Some areas recorded approximately 300 mm (12 in) of rainfall, equivalent to a year's-worth of rain. These amounts exceed any accumulations in the region in at least 70 years. The flooding in Golestan and Mazandaran provinces is considered a 1-in-100-year event.

On 6 April 2019, about two weeks after the flood, the town of Aqqala in the northern province of Golestan, is still covered with lethal flood. Local authorities say "they have to wait for the water to vaporize".

The governor of Golestan province was also reportedly on vacation outside the country during the floods. Later, he was dismissed by the vice President.

=== Shiraz ===
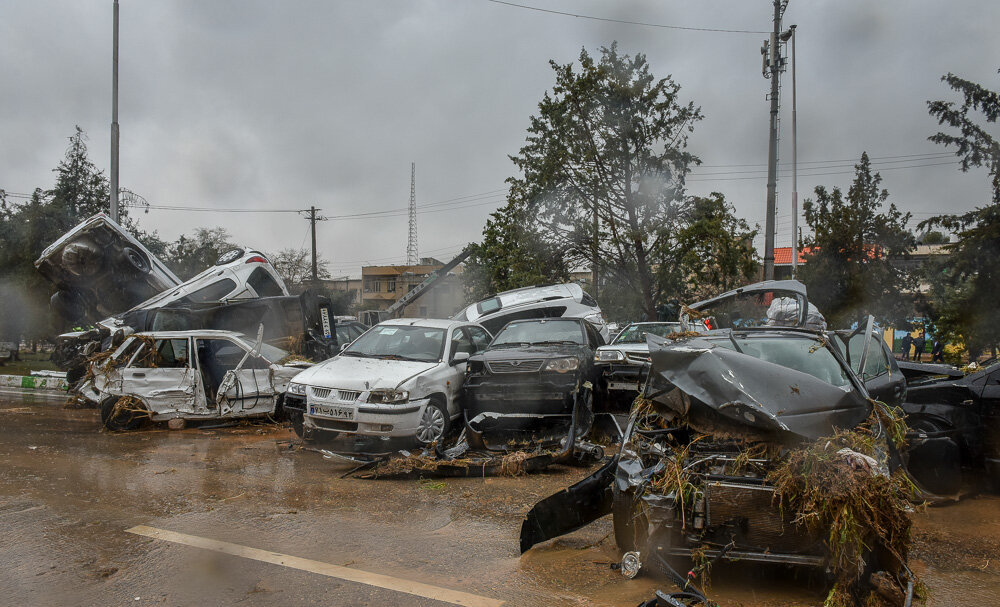
Damage of flooding in Shiraz

On 25 March, flash floods following heavy rains in Southwestern Iran in the vicinity of the city of Shiraz killed 19 people and injured more than 200 others. Many people were traveling for the Nowruz holiday, and were injured or killed when their cars were swept off of roads. Rain was short but heavy, lasting in two bursts of approximately 15 minutes each; however, the impact was exacerbated by the heavy road traffic at the time. Iran's Meteorological Organisation gave warnings for further floods, as heavy rains were expected to last at least until 27 March. The leader of the Iranian Ministry of Energy has stated that climate change was a contributing factor to the flooding. As of 26 March 2019, 20 of Iran's 31 provinces are either currently flooded or facing the possibility of imminent flooding.

According to a dissident news organization, local sources reported that as many as 150 people were killed in the floods in Shiraz on 25 March. Official reports, however, indicated that a total of 21 people were killed in Fars province, which includes Shiraz, by 5 April.

A brief but intense rainfall caused a sudden flash flood that submerged the main highway between Shiraz and Esfahan, trapping many travelers who had been leaving the city after Nowruz celebrations. City officials did not warn the people of Shiraz of the deadly weather conditions resulting in many deaths.

The initial investigations of the Shiraz flash floods showed that a water canal adjacent to the Quran Gate was paved over in the early 2000s for use as a road by the Shiraz municipality. The road expansion did not include a sufficient drainage system.

=== Lorestan ===
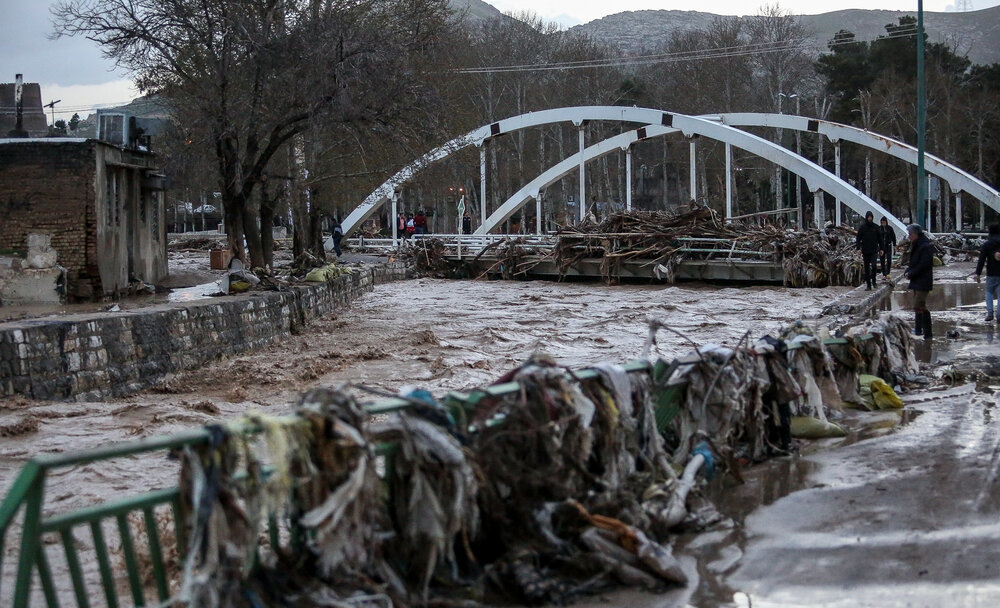
Flooding in Pol-e dokhtar, Lorestan province.

The railway between Tehran and southwestern Iran had already been shut down on 1 April following initial floods.

Heavy rains on 3 April, have completely overwhelmed several towns in the mountainous Lorestan province. The town of Poldokhtar in Lorestan province was engulfed by flood water. After the floodwaters subsided, cars and homes remained sunken in thick layers of mud. According to a dissident news agency, an internal police report stated that at least 90 people were killed when floods engulfed the western city of Poldokhtar in Lorestan province. According to the IRGC-affiliated Tasnim News Agency, Heydari said that the conditions in Poldokhtar were "horrific".

At least 150,000 people were evacuated within the province.

=== Khuzestan ===
Due to heavy rain fall in Zagros Mountains, Dez River and Karkheh River overflowed and water accumulated in Dez Dam and Karkheh Dam so that Karkhe dam's reservoir located in Khuzestan province, reached to 8400 m^{3}/sec. As dams reached to their maximum capacity, power ministry of Iran managed to release water.

On 31 March the Government of Iran declared a state of emergency for Khuzestan province. President Hassan Rouhani deployed "all available capacities" to assist victims.

Khuzestan's governor Gholamreza Shariati ordered six towns and cities and about 70 villages located along the Karkheh River have to be evacuated, but about Ahvaz, Khuzestan's capital is not an injunction for evacuation. 47 camps in the province have been prepared to house for 30,400 people.

In order to prevent disaster occurrence, the Karkheh Dam, which was at near capacity, was opened to discharge excessive water.

On 8 April 2019, 20 lifeboats for rescue works in Iran floods was donated by Germany. Khuzestan Red Crescent Society Director Ali Khodadadi said officials will use them for rescue operations in Dasht-e-Azadegan, Shush, Shushtar, Ahvaz and other regions located in the southwestern Khuzestan province.

During the second week of April, about 200 villages had been evacuated, with 46,000 people displaced and living in emergency shelters. In total, 6 cities and 210 villages were inundated.

In Ahvaz, 110 patients were evacuated from a hospital for the mentally ill on 8 April, according to a government news agency.

=== Tehran ===
A major rockfall caused by heavy rains on 31 March injured five people.

=== Kermanshah ===
At least 19,000 people were evacuated from their homes following floods on 31 March.

=== Isfahan ===
On 31 March, Golpayegan Dam located in Isfahan province near the borders with Markazi and Lorestan provinces filled, therefore the people residing in the areas near the downstream of the dam and river banks were warned to evacuate their homes.

=== Other cities ===
On 25 March, there was a warning because of flood in some 26 provinces of 31 and villages near rivers and dams in several provinces have been ordered to evacuate from rising water. In Hamedan, heavy snowfall was reported to have destroyed buildings. Water levels in Lake Urmia, in northwestern Iran, rose by 42 cm by 5 April.

On 14 April, Officials warned people living in the east of Iran, because of heavy rains forecast.

== Causes ==
Using NASA's data, an atmospheric river (AR), named AR Dena, was found responsible for the record floods of March 2019 in Iran. This rare AR started its long, 9000 km journey from the Atlantic Ocean and travelled across North Africa before its final landfall over the Zagros Mountains. Water transport by AR Dena was equivalent to more than 150 times the aggregated flow of the four major rivers in the region (Tigris, Euphrates, Karun and Karkheh). This event was a compelling example of rapid dry-to-wet transitions and intensification of extremes, resulting from the climate change.

== Climate change ==
According to an Aljazeera report, the recent floods arose from climate change and global warming. The head of Iran's meteorology service stated that a decades-long drought has not been solved by the flood.

== Damage ==
Province	Deaths	Agricultural damage (preliminary)
Fars province	23	US$77.4 million
Lorestan	15	US$94.1 million
Golestan province	8	US$480.0 million
Mazandaran	6	US$166.4 million
Hamadan	5	N/A
North Khorasan	3	US$28.9 million
Rasht/Qazvin	2	N/A
Kohgiluyeh and Boyer-Ahmad	2	US$58.2 million
Khuzestan	1	US$138.2 million
Kermanshah	1	US$33.0 million
Semnan province	1	US$5.7 million
Qom	1	N/A
Razavi Khorasan	1	N/A
Chaharmahal and Bakhtiari	0	US$45.3 million
Isfahan	0	US$22.8 million
Sistan and Balochistan	0	US$5.9 million
Total	77+	1.1+ billion USD

The flooding caused the destruction of hundreds of millions of dollars of infrastructure and the collapse of at least 314 bridges across the country. Twenty-three of the nation's thirty-one provinces were affected. Agriculture suffered tremendous damage, with losses in the sector reaching 46 trillion rials (US$1.1 billion) by 3 April. Golestan accounted for the largest portion at 20 trillion rials (US$480 million). At least 25,000 houses were completely destroyed, while another 60,000 sustained some form of damage. 44 public libraries in Iran also suffered flood damage. According to reports from Aljazeera, out of 800 villages affected by the flood in Golestan, 95 villages are yet to recover from it.

Mohamad Hossein Talebian, deputy chairman of Iran's Cultural Heritage Organization reported on 27 March that "cracks on the ancient reliefs in Naqsh-e Rustam in Fars province are widening in a critical way." Social media reports revealed a waterfall made by the floods that has been washing away parts of the monument. In April 1398, the floods caused severe damage to the city of Khorramabad. The construction of a new and non-expert bridge on the Khorramabad River with a very low altitude from the river level has exacerbated and flooded the streets of Khorramabad city. The Iranian authorities say that currently, a projected bill of at least $2.5 billion is needed to fix the damage, according to NBC News.

According to Talebian, "The Persepolis remains intact as its ancient water ducts have drained flood water." The ancient water ducts also protected the Tomb of Cyrus the Great and saved the internationally acclaimed site from destruction by the floods. Excavations of Great Wall of Gorgan were also damaged due to its close proximity to a dry riverbed which experienced flooding. The floods have damaged the Aq Qala bridge in northern Iran and several other centuries-old bridges in Isfahan and Shoushtar. According to the guardian, the damages have been so severe that the Iranian authorities have stopped foreign journalists from visiting the areas that are affected the worst.

On 15 April 2019 it was reported that a leisure center that belonged to Iran's security forces was one of the "major structures" responsible for the recent deadly flood.

== Relief efforts ==
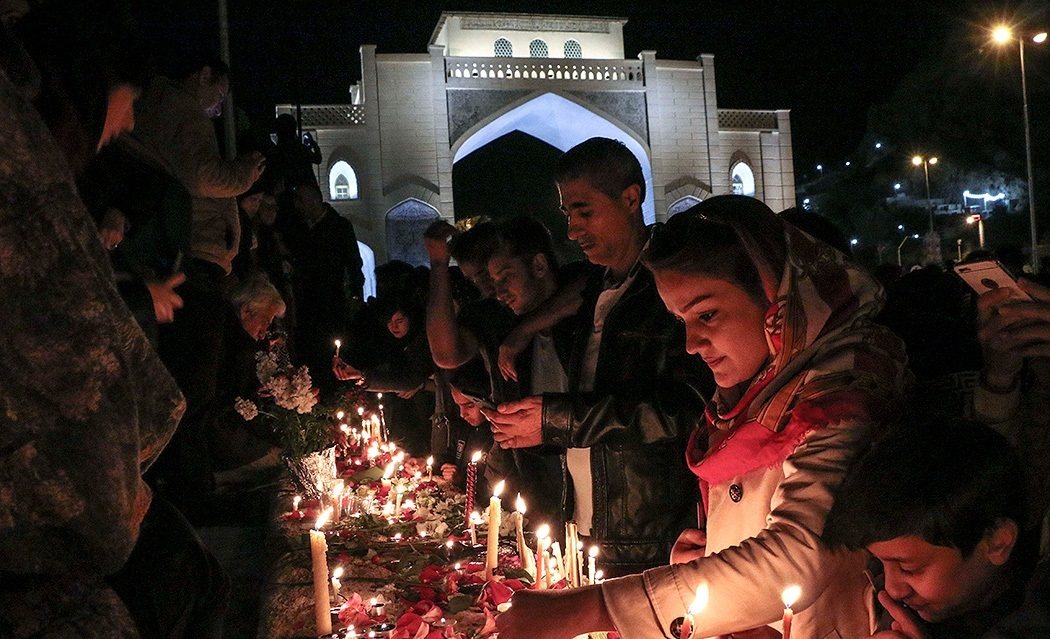
People in Shiraz light candles at Quran Gate

On 23 March, Iran's supreme leader, Ali Khamenei, commanded the Armed Forces of the Islamic Republic of Iran to participate in the relief efforts. Civil and armed forces have been mobilized since 24 March and Eshaq Jahangiri with several ministers as well as army commanders have traveled to the areas affected by floods to help people.

On 25 March, Shortly after the floods began the Rouhani administration proceeded to ban all third party charities to help the flood relief effort citing that all donations must be made directly to the Iranian government thus preventing foreign aid from reaching the country. On 6 April, as the Iran government has promised, all damages will be recompensed, actually for farmers.

On 25 March, Chief Justice of Iran, Ebrahim Raisi stated that "Any shortcomings regarding the handling of the floods, failure to provide relief and aid to the survivors will be investigated".

On 7 April, according to Iranian Red Cross, "14,238 units of tents, 58,494 packs of blankets, 32,961 packs of ground sheets, 43,509 kg of plastic sheets, 3,083 pcs of heaters, 2,851 health sets, 1355 kitchen sets, 227,696 bottles of mineral water, 125,993 canned food, 235,405 loaves of bread, 1,877 kg of date, 41,992 kg of rice, 9,485 kg of edible oil, 3955 boxes of Biscuits, 8,710 kg of sugar, 11,753 kg of beans and 84,580 food packages" have been distributed. In total, "537,000 kgs of food and living items have been transferred through 556 flight hours and 1,970 relief and rescue workers were transported". The relief services include proving basic supports such as food and water "for more than 257,000 people and proving temporally shelters for more than 98,000 persons." In addition, "1138 persons were transferred to safe areas and 89 persons transferred to the clinics." According to Iranian Red Cross, several thousands of vital requirements have been distributed among those affected by floods.

On 9 April, following the Relief efforts in Golestan province, Deputy Commander of Neynava Division of the IRGC Colonel Seyed Mousa Hosseini promised that in order to enliven people, their efforts such as feeding, relief aid, and housing is keeping until normally everyday life appears. Shahid Shoushtari field hospital belong to the IRGC Ground Force and the specialized hospital of the IRGC's Navy have been established respectively in Aqqala and also Siminshahr and Golmishan, about 78328 injured people have been cured. He added that "In the engineering sector, the IRGC's Brigade 45 of Engineers built 20 bridges on the road between Gomishan to Bandar Turkmen in less than 60 hours."

Relief efforts including clearing rubble, diverting water, building dykes, and distributing supplies are performing by local communities, soldiers and volunteers. On 9 April, volunteer team including 90 trained rescue people from West Azerbaijan province went to flood-stricken regions.

In order to help to flood-stricken people, the Execution of Imam Khomeini's Order (EIKO) known as Setad has prepared essential equipment containing fresh food, blankets, drinking water, and even toys for children. Also EIKO furnished facilities (fridges, washing machines, carpets, and other necessary elements) for 15000 families and provided 4,000 cattle of 9,000 killed by the flood for families living in villages. Some temporary clinics have been established to cure wounded and give medicine. The Barakat Foundation performed most of aids as the representative of EIKO. In other hands, the organization ensured, when people return to their normal life, EIKO will be able to "provide some 3,000 job opportunities" for citizens. In Khouzistan exposed to flood risk, 140,000 rural homes were insured by Barakat Foundation.

=== International aid ===
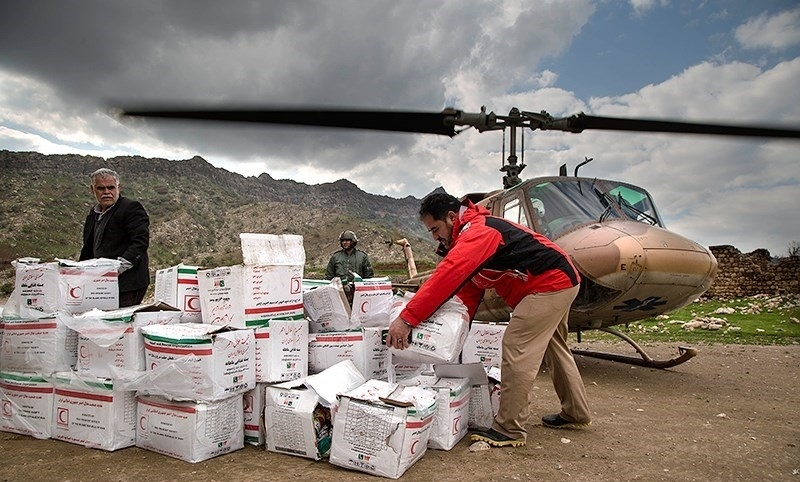
Iranian Red Crescent Society distributes aids

Pakistan's National Disaster Management Authority, on the order of country's Prime Minister Imran Khan, sent 32 tonnes of relief goods to Iran. The consignment comprising two shipments contained 500 tents, 3,300 blankets and emergency medical kits. The relief goods were transferred using two C-130 aircraft. Previously Pakistan's Foreign Office (FO) spokesperson, Dr. Muhammad Faisal, condoled with the families of the victims. The spokesperson further claimed that Pakistan is ready to provide humanitarian assistance to Iran in rescue effort. He claimed that people of Pakistan stand in solidarity with Iranian people in their difficult time.

The European Union pledged to donate 1.2 million Euros to help with relief efforts.

On 13 April, The aid convoy including more than 100 vehicles which was sent by Iraq's Harakat Hezbollah al-Nujaba, a major Shia resistance group arrived in Iran. The consignments have been donated to Iran's flood-stricken people living in Khuzestan and Lorestan provinces.

On 13 April Ali Asghar Peyvandi, the head of Iranian Red Crescent Society, said that despite non-cash assistance such as blankets, tents, sanitary wares donated from Kuwait, Turkey, Azerbaijan, France, Germany, Armenia, Pakistan, foreign cash aid has not been deposited to the Iranian Red Crescent account, So far, we have not received even a dollar or one euro. He mentioned that the reason for this is closure of the SWIFT and Iranian Red Crescent account as a result of Sanctions. Also, it is not possible for the Iranians abroad and International Committee of the Red Cross to deposit cash aid to the Iranian Red Crescent account.

In order to assist people who have been affected by the heavy flood in Iran, the WHO on 10 April 2019, has deployed important medical supplies in the country.

== Controversy ==
President Hassan Rouhani was heavily criticized for his delayed response. Rouhani suffered greater scrutiny after it was revealed that he was on vacation on Iran's Qeshm Island in the Persian Gulf and returned to Tehran while the floods had begun subsiding. The lack of aid and the presence of the Iranian government quickly prompted outrage among the victims of the floods. Iranians across the nation expressed their frustration by a Persian hashtag translated as "Where is Rouhani?" Iranians also began calling for Rouhani's resignation. "Mr. Rouhani, you better submit your resignation from wherever you are. Your appearance will only open up people's wounds," read another tweet. The governor of Golestan province was also reportedly on vacation outside the country during the floods. Foreign journalists were not allowed to covering the flood-stricken areas according to Atlantic Council.

Many Iranians took to social media platforms to criticize the handling of the floods by the regime specifically Rouhani. Swedish-Iranian academic and researcher Ahmad Reza Jalali, currently on death row after being sentenced at the Islamic Revolutionary Court in Tehran, gave an interview to U.S. government-funded Radio Farda attributing the destruction of natural plant coverage, obstruction of flood outlets, and converting flood routes and dry river beds to residential areas following the Islamic Revolution were the causes of the flash floods in Shiraz.

In April 2019, two weeks after the flood, Mohammad Pakpour, a commander of Iran's Islamic Revolutionary Guards Corps (IRGC) told the reporters there had been "no management" of the rescue or aid operations in Pol-e Dokhtar and that government officials would not "dare" to go the area because the "people are in a rebellious mood".

Mohammad Javad Zarif, Iran's foreign minister, and Ali Larijani, speaker of the Parliament, have condemned the United States which prevents the delivery of relief aid from the International Red Cross by its sanctions against Iran. Zarif said that "This isn't just economic warfare; it's economic terrorism". On the other hand, Mike Pompeo, United States Secretary of State, denied accusations and blamed Iran's government for mismanagement.

On 12 April 2019, angry flood stricken people in Ahwaz, the capital of southern province of Khuzestan, took to the streets protesting the government's inaction to divert flood into the lagoons of Hour Al-Azim away from towns and villages.

== See also ==
- 2017 Northwest Iran floods
