= Esfanjan, East Azerbaijan =

Village in East Azerbaijan province, Iran

Esfanjan Persian: اسفنجان
- Village
- Location within Iran
- Coordinates: 37°54′14″N 46°10′27″E
- Country: Iran
- Province: East Azerbaijan
- County: Osku
- District: Central
- Rural District: Sahand

Population (2016)
  - Total: 3,544
- Time zone: UTC+3:30 (IRST)

Esfanjan (Persian: اسفنجان) (Note: Also romanized as Esfanjān) is a village in, and the capital of, Sahand Rural District in the Central District of Osku County, East Azerbaijan province, Iran.

== Demographics ==
=== Population ===
At the time of the 2006 National Census, the village's population was 3,660 in 1,060 households. The following census in 2011 counted 3,832 people in 1,206 households. The 2016 census measured the population of the village as 3,544 people in 1,168 households. It was the most populous village in its rural district.
