= Shahrak Rural District (Azarshahr County) =

Rural district in East Azerbaijan province, Iran

Shahrak Rural District Persian: دهستان شهرک
- Rural District
- Location within Iran
- Coordinates: 37°50′N 45°59′E
- Country: Iran
- Province: East Azerbaijan
- County: Azarshahr
- District: Mamqan
- Established: 2003
- Capital: Mamqan

Population (2016)
  - Total: 0
- Time zone: UTC+3:30 (IRST)

Shahrak Rural District (Persian: دهستان شهرک) (Note: Formerly Khanamir Rural District (دهستان خان مير)) is in Mamqan District (Note: Formerly the Central District) of Azarshahr County, East Azerbaijan province, Iran. It is administered from the city of Mamqan. The previous capital of the rural district was the village of Khanamir, now in Yengejeh Rural District.

== Demographics ==
=== Population ===
At the time of the 2006 National Censuses of 2006 and 2011, the rural district's population was below the reporting threshold. The 2016 census measured the population of the rural district as zero.
