= Dinabad, East Azerbaijan =

Village in East Azerbaijan province, Iran

Dinabad Persian: دين اباد
- Village
- Location within Iran
- Coordinates: 37°39′45″N 45°59′06″E
- Country: Iran
- Province: East Azerbaijan
- County: Azarshahr
- District: Howmeh
- Rural District: Qebleh Daghi

Population (2016)
  - Total: 477
- Time zone: UTC+3:30 (IRST)

Dinabad (Persian: دين اباد) (Note: Also romanized as Dīnābād) is a village in Qebleh Daghi Rural District of Howmeh District in Azarshahr County, East Azerbaijan province, Iran.

== Demographics ==
=== Population ===
At the time of the 2006 National Census, the village's population was 582 in 152 households. The following census in 2011 counted 579 people in 174 households. The 2016 census measured the population of the village as 477 people in 142 households.
