= Seylab, East Azerbaijan =

Village in East Azerbaijan province, Iran

Seylab Persian: سيلاب
- Village
- Location within Iran
- Coordinates: 37°35′52″N 45°52′11″E
- Country: Iran
- Province: East Azerbaijan
- County: Azarshahr
- District: Howmeh
- Rural District: Shiramin

Population (2016)
  - Total: 1,530
- Time zone: UTC+3:30 (IRST)

Seylab (Persian: سيلاب) (Note: Also romanized as Seilab, Seylāb, and Sīlāb) is a village in Shiramin Rural District of Howmeh District in Azarshahr County, East Azerbaijan province, Iran.

== Demographics ==
=== Population ===
At the time of the 2006 National Census, the village's population was 1,414 in 379 households. The following census in 2011 counted 1,554 people in 495 households. The 2016 census measured the population of the village as 1,530 people in 494 households.
