= Dash Almalu =

Village in East Azerbaijan province, Iran

Dash Almalu Persian: داش‌آلمالو
- Village
- Location within Iran
- Coordinates: 37°41′02″N 46°06′04″E
- Country: Iran
- Province: East Azerbaijan
- County: Azarshahr
- District: Howmeh
- Rural District: Yengejeh

Population (2016)
  - Total: 932
- Time zone: UTC+3:30 (IRST)

Dash Almalu (Persian: داش‌آلمالو) (Note: Also romanized as Dāsh Ālmālū; also known as Ālmālū Dāsh) is a village in Yengejeh Rural District of Howmeh District in Azarshahr County, East Azerbaijan province, Iran.

== Demographics ==
=== Population ===
At the time of the 2006 National Census, the village's population was 788 in 148 households. The following census in 2011 counted 873 people in 212 households. The 2016 census measured the population of the village as 932 people in 252 households.
