= Dastjerd Rural District =

Dastjerd Rural District (Persian: دهستان دستجرد) may refer to:

- Dastjerd Rural District (Azarshahr County)
- Dastjerd Rural District (Qazvin Province)
- Dastjerd Rural District (Qom Province)
