= Gogan =

Gogan may refer to:

- Good Governance Ambassadors of Nigeria
- Gugan, a city in East Azerbaijan Province, Iran
- Gogan, Mureș, a village in the commune Bahnea, Mureș county, Romania
- Gogan, Rongelap, an islet in Rongelap atoll, Marshall Islands
