= Makran Trench =

Subduction zone in the Gulf of Oman

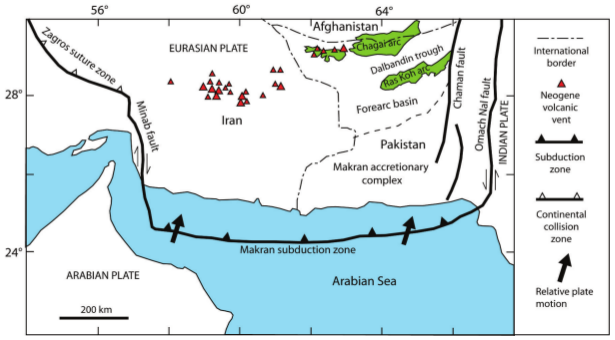
Makran subduction zone, Persian Gulf–Arabian Sea

The Makran Trench is the physiographic expression of a subduction zone along the northeastern margin of the Gulf of Oman adjacent to the southwestern coast of Balochistan of Pakistan and the southeastern coast of Iran. In this region the oceanic crust of the Arabian plate is being subducted beneath the continental crust of the Eurasian plate.

== Tectonics ==
In the Makran region, the Arabian plate subducts beneath the Eurasian plate at ~2-4 cm/yr. This subduction is associated with an accretionary wedge of sediments which has developed since the Cenozoic. To the west, the Makran Trench is connected by the Minab Fault system to the Zagros fold and thrust belt. To the east, the Makran Trench is bounded by the transpressional strike-slip Ornach-Nal and Chaman Faults, which connect to the Himalayan orogeny. The Makran Subduction Zone is often split into two segments: the east and west. The Sonne fault divides the two. Though largely much quieter than many other subduction zones, studies reveal that the Makran Trench may be capable of very large earthquakes, even extending into the magnitude 9 range.

== Fluids, gas and mud volcanoes ==
The Makran accretionary complex is characterized by a number of features associated with escaping water and methane. Mud volcanoes are found onshore in both Iran and Pakistan, and cold seeps exist offshore. The formation of an island (Zalzala Jazeera) after the 2013 Balochistan earthquakes is thought to be the result of a mud volcano. An island (Malan island) formed as a mud volcano subsided under water due to gas release and mud extrusion. Heavy rain from monsoon season built pressure to the aquifer, enhancing the release of gas.

== Earthquakes ==
- 1945 Balochistan earthquake: A magnitude 8.1 event occurred on 28 November, causing a tsunami on the Makran coast.
- 5 August 1947: Mw 6.8 event just off the coast of western Pakistan
- 7 December 1989: Mw 6.0 event near the coast of southern Iran
- 7 February 2017: Mw 6.3 event just off the coast of western Pakistan

== See also ==
- Offshore Indus Basin
- Pamir Mountains
- Panjshir Valley
