= Amqan =

Village in East Azerbaijan province, Iran

Amqan Persian: امقان
- Village
- Location within Iran
- Coordinates: 37°49′53″N 46°15′49″E
- Country: Iran
- Province: East Azerbaijan
- County: Osku
- District: Central
- Rural District: Sahand

Population (2016)
  - Total: 728
- Time zone: UTC+3:30 (IRST)

Amqan (Persian: امقان) (Note: Also romanized as Āmaqān, Āmeqān, and Āmqān; also known as Āghmeqān, Amagan, Amahan, and Ameghan) is a village in Sahand Rural District of the Central District in Osku County, East Azerbaijan province, Iran.

== Demographics ==
=== Population ===
At the time of the 2006 National Census, the village's population was 794 in 185 households. The following census in 2011 counted 761 people in 220 households. The 2016 census measured the population of the village as 728 people in 229 households.
