= Kharaju, Azarshahr =

Village in East Azerbaijan province, Iran

Kharaju Persian: خراجو
- Village
- Location within Iran
- Coordinates: 37°43′30″N 45°58′59″E
- Country: Iran
- Province: East Azerbaijan
- County: Azarshahr
- District: Howmeh
- Rural District: Qebleh Daghi

Population (2016)
  - Total: 892
- Time zone: UTC+3:30 (IRST)

Kharaju (Persian: خراجو) (Note: Also romanized as Kharājū) is a village in Qebleh Daghi Rural District of Howmeh District in Azarshahr County, East Azerbaijan province, Iran.

== Demographics ==
=== Population ===
At the time of the 2006 National Census, the village's population was 709 in 183 households. The following census in 2011 counted 823 people in 238 households. The 2016 census measured the population of the village as 892 people in 281 households.
