= 2017 Northwest Iran floods =

Natural disaster in Iran

2017 Iran's North West
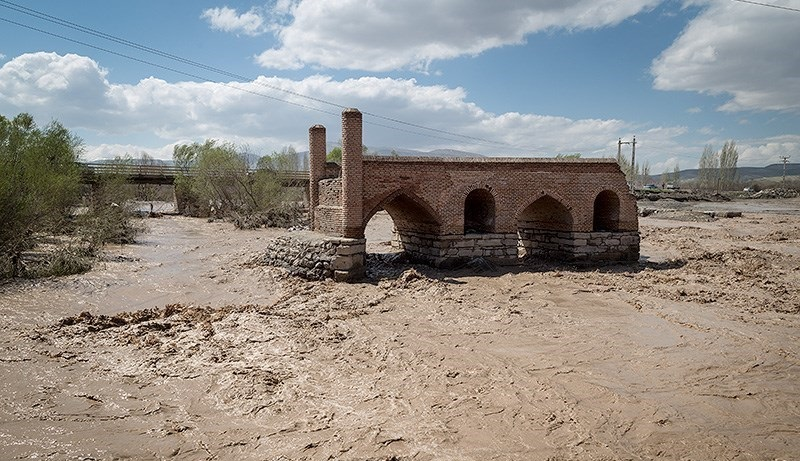
- Date: 14 April 2017
- Location: West Azerbaijan province East Azerbaijan province Kurdistan province
- Deaths: 42 deaths

The 2017 Northwest Iran floods were flash floods caused by heavy rains in northwest Iran on April 14, 2017. Flooding was observed in East Azerbaijan, West Azerbaijan, Kordestan, and Zanjan provinces. The flood claimed the lives of more than 40 people, and it was deadliest in East Azerbaijan province, where it left 37 dead.

== Cause ==
The flood followed after a heavy rain fell for about a day. The rainfall had a maximum total of 47.1 mm in Azarshahr, which was accompanied by 90 km/h wind.

== Casualties ==
More than 40 people lost their lives in this flood. The majority of casualties were reported from East Azerbaijan province including 17 people who trapped in the flash flood while commuting under a bridge over Seil Chaii in the entrance of Ghallehzar village. While normal traffic to the road was not blocked, cars were commuting through the road next to the flooded river. In a sudden flash flood, 5 cars were driven away by the floodwaters and all 17 passengers inside the cars were killed. The highest casualty incident occurred in Chenar, Ajab Shir where 21 residents were swept away in a flash flood. In the days after the flood, the bodies of 17 victims were recovered. The survivors in Chenar village claimed that there was no flood warning issued.

== See also ==
- 2019 Iran floods
