= Qazi Jahan =

Village in East Azerbaijan province, Iran

Qazi Jahan Persian: قاضی‌جهان
- Village
- Location within Iran
- Coordinates: 37°46′31″N 45°56′33″E
- Country: Iran
- Province: East Azerbaijan
- County: Azarshahr
- District: Howmeh
- Rural District: Qazi Jahan

Population (2016)
  - Total: 3,359
- Time zone: UTC+3:30 (IRST)

Qazi Jahan (Persian: قاضی‌جهان) (Note: Also romanized as Qāẕī Jahān) is a village in, and the capital of, Qazi Jahan Rural District in Howmeh District of Azarshahr County, East Azerbaijan province, Iran.

== Demographics ==
=== Population ===
At the time of the 2006 National Census, the village's population was 3,128 in 874 households. The following census in 2011 counted 3,283 people in 1,030 households. The 2016 census measured the population of the village as 3,359 people in 1,107 households. It was the most populous village in its rural district.
