= Javad Hajizadeh Koljahi =

Iranian politician (b. 1958)

- جواد حاجی زاده کلجاهی
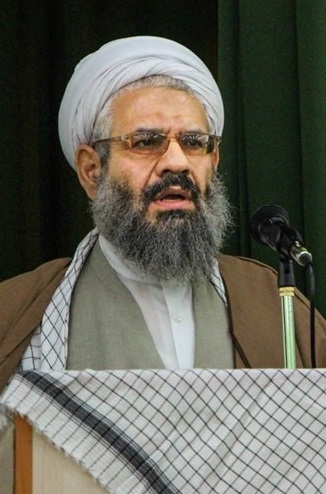

Member of the Assembly of Experts
- Constituency: East Azerbaijan
- Majority: 198,687

Personal details
- Born: 1958 (age 67–68) Kalahjah, East Azerbaijan province
- Parent: Kazem (father)
- Education: Qom Hawza

Javad Hajizadeh Koljahi (Persian: جواد حاجی زاده کلجاهی (born in 1958 in Kalahjah) is a Shiite cleric and Friday prayer leader of Maragheh who was elected as a representative of East Azerbaijan Province in the sixth session of the Assembly of Experts by winning 198,687 votes.

== Biography ==
Javad Hajizadeh was born in 1958 in the village of Kolja in Osku County. He entered the Tabriz Seminary in 1970 and was ordained as a cleric in 1976 by Seyyed Hassan Angji. He has continued his education at the Qom Seminary since 1977.

== Professors ==
- Mohammad Taqi Sotoudeh
- Ansari Shirazi
- Javad Tabrizi
- Javadi Amoli
- Hassanzadeh Amoli

== Authors ==
Dozens of articles, versions of Javad Tabrizi's jurisprudence and principles courses, as well as the book Marriage in Islam have been published by him.

== Executive Responsibilities ==
- Tabriz Air Defense
- Friday prayer leader of Ahar County

== See also ==
- List of members in the Fifth Term of the Council of Experts
