= Kharaju (disambiguation) =

Kharaju is a city and the capital of Saraju District, in Maragheh County, East Azerbaijan Province, Iran.

Kharaju may also refer to:

- Kharaju, Azarshahr, a village in Qebleh Daghi Rural District, Howmeh District, Azarshahr County, East Azerbaijan Province, Iran.

== See also ==
- Kharajuz or Qareh Gowzlu, Zanjan, a village in Qoltuq Rural District, in the Central District of Zanjan County, Zanjan Province, Iran
