= Dizaj, Osku =

Village in East Azerbaijan province, Iran

Dizaj Persian: ديزج
- Village
- Location within Iran
- Coordinates: 37°55′38″N 46°03′52″E
- Country: Iran
- Province: East Azerbaijan
- County: Osku
- District: Central
- Rural District: Bavil

Population (2016)
  - Total: 2,946
- Time zone: UTC+3:30 (IRST)

Dizaj (Persian: ديزج امیرمدار) (Note: Also romanized as Dīzaji; also known as Dīzaj Amīr, Dīzaj-e Amīr Madār, and Dizeh) is a village in Bavil Rural District of the Central District in Osku County, East Azerbaijan province, Iran.

== Demographics ==
=== Population ===
At the time of the 2006 National Census, the village's population was 2,990 in 818 households. The following census in 2011 counted 3,123 people in 930 households. The 2016 census measured the population of the village as 2,946 people in 942 households.
