= Astara =

Astara may refer to:

== Places in Iran ==
- Astara, Iran, a city in Gilan Province
- Astara County, in Gilan Province
- Astara (electoral district), in Gilan Province
- Astara, East Azerbaijan, a village

== Places in Azerbaijan ==
- Astara District
- Astara, Azerbaijan, capital of Astara Rayon

== Other uses ==
- Kristin Astara, an American wrestler
