= Eskandan =

Village in East Azerbaijan province, Iran

Eskandan Persian: اسكندان
- Village
- Location within Iran
- Coordinates: 37°52′04″N 46°12′55″E
- Country: Iran
- Province: East Azerbaijan
- County: Osku
- District: Central
- Rural District: Sahand

Population (2016)
  - Total: 894
- Time zone: UTC+3:30 (IRST)

Eskandan (Persian: اسكندان) (Note: Also romanized as Eskandān; also known as Iskandan and Iskania) is a village in Sahand Rural District of the Central District in Osku County, East Azerbaijan province, Iran.

== Demographics ==
=== Population ===
At the time of the 2006 National Census, the village's population was 837 in 231 households. The following census in 2011 counted 898 people in 257 households. The 2016 census measured the population of the village as 894 people in 307 households.
