= Kushan-e Mirza Rahim =

Village in East Azerbaijan province, Iran

Kushan-e Mirza Rahim Persian: كوشن ميرزارحيم
- Village
- Location within Iran
- Coordinates: 37°55′29″N 46°05′08″E
- Country: Iran
- Province: East Azerbaijan
- County: Osku
- District: Central
- Rural District: Bavil

Population (2016)
  - Total: 118
- Time zone: UTC+3:30 (IRST)

Kushan-e Mirza Rahim (Persian: كوشن ميرزارحيم) (Note: Also romanized as Kūshan-e Mīrzā Raḥīm) is a village in Bavil Rural District of the Central District in Osku County, East Azerbaijan province, Iran.

== Demographics ==
=== Population ===
At the time of the 2006 National Census, the village's population was 81 in 24 households. The following census in 2011 counted 42 people in 15 households. The 2016 census measured the population of the village as 118 people in 40 households.
