= Bayram, East Azerbaijan =

Village in East Azerbaijan province, Iran

Bayram Persian: بايرام
- Village
- Location within Iran
- Coordinates: 37°56′13″N 46°04′13″E
- Country: Iran
- Province: East Azerbaijan
- County: Osku
- District: Central
- Rural District: Bavil

Population (2016)
  - Total: 2,982
- Time zone: UTC+3:30 (IRST)

Bayram (Persian: بايرام) (Note: Also romanized as Bāyrām) is a village in Bavil Rural District of the Central District in Osku County, East Azerbaijan province, Iran.

== Demographics ==
=== Population ===
At the time of the 2006 National Census, the village's population was 2,671 in 771 households. The following census in 2011 counted 2,815 people in 856 households. The 2016 census measured the population of the village as 2,982 people in 977 households. It was the most populous village in its rural district.
