= Gonbar =

Village in East Azerbaijan province, Iran

Gonbar Persian: گنبر
- Village
- Location within Iran
- Coordinates: 37°42′58″N 46°13′23″E
- Country: Iran
- Province: East Azerbaijan
- County: Osku
- District: Central
- Rural District: Gonbar

Population (2016)
  - Total: 3,460
- Time zone: UTC+3:30 (IRST)

Gonbar (Persian: گنبر) (Note: Also known as Gonbarf and Gonbarof) is a village in Gonbar Rural District of the Central District in Osku County, East Azerbaijan province, Iran.

Gonbar is famous for its mild summer climate. It attracts numerous tourists from nearby cities, particularly from Tabriz. The main occupation of the people is agriculture and gardening. Walnuts are a major product.

== Demographics ==
=== Population ===
At the time of the 2006 National Census, the village's population was 3,091 in 639 households. The following census in 2011 counted 3,301 people in 786 households. The 2016 census measured the population of the village as 3,460 people in 1,002 households. It was the most populous village in its rural district.
