= Ghallehzar =

Village in East Azerbaijan province, Iran

Ghallehzar Persian: غله زار
- Village
- Location within Iran
- Coordinates: 37°45′32″N 45°56′33″E
- Country: Iran
- Province: East Azerbaijan
- County: Azarshahr
- District: Howmeh
- Rural District: Qazi Jahan

Population (2016)
  - Total: 147
- Time zone: UTC+3:30 (IRST)

Ghallehzar (Persian: غله زار) (Note: Also romanized as Ghallehzār) is a village in Qazi Jahan Rural District in Howmeh District of Azarshahr County of East Azerbaijan province, Iran.

== Demographics ==
=== Population ===
At the time of the 2006 National Census, the village's population was 198 in 47 households. The following census in 2011 counted 162 people in 44 households. The 2016 census measured the population of the village as 147 people in 43 households.
