= Kahnamu =

Village in East Azerbaijan province, Iran

Kahnamu Persian: کهنمو
- Village
- Location within Iran
- Coordinates: 37°51′36″N 46°11′39″E
- Country: Iran
- Province: East Azerbaijan
- County: Osku
- District: Central
- Rural District: Sahand

Population (2016)
  - Total: 2,305
- Time zone: UTC+3:30 (IRST)

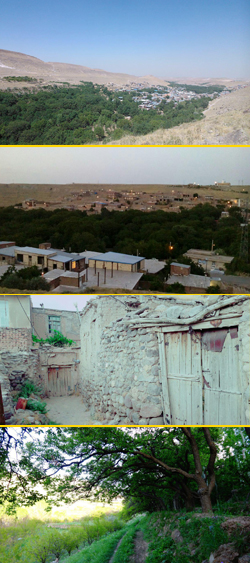
Various locations in Kahnamu

Kahnamu (Persian: کهنمو) (Note: Also romanized as Kahnamū) is a village in Sahand Rural District of the Central District in Osku County, East Azerbaijan province, Iran.

== Demographics ==
=== Population ===
At the time of the 2006 National Census, the village's population was 2,210 in 644 households. The following census in 2011 counted 2,407 people in 773 households. The 2016 census measured the population of the village as 2,305 people in 752 households.
