= Nadilu =

Village in East Azerbaijan province, Iran

Nadilu Persian: ناديلو
- Village
- Location within Iran
- Coordinates: 37°43′31″N 45°57′50″E
- Country: Iran
- Province: East Azerbaijan
- County: Azarshahr
- District: Howmeh
- Rural District: Qebleh Daghi

Population (2016)
  - Total: 3,436
- Time zone: UTC+3:30 (IRST)

Nadilu (Persian: ناديلو) (Note: Also romanized as Nādīllū and Nādīlū) is a village in, and the capital of, Qebleh Daghi Rural District in Howmeh District of Azarshahr County, East Azerbaijan province, Iran. It was the capital of the district until its administration was transferred to the city of Azarshahr.

== Demographics ==
=== Population ===
At the time of the 2006 National Census, the village's population was 3,116 in 821 households. The following census in 2011 counted 3,479 people in 1,030 households. The 2016 census measured the population of the village as 3,436 people in 1,083 households. It was the most populous village in its rural district.
