= Almalu, Iran =

Almalu (Persian: المالو) in Iran may refer to:

- Almalu, Ajab Shir, East Azerbaijan Province
- Almalu, Bostanabad, East Azerbaijan Province
- Almalu Dash, East Azerbaijan Province
- Almalu, West Azerbaijan
- Almalu, Zanjan
- Almalu, Mahneshan, Zanjan Province
- Almalu Rural District, in East Azerbaijan Province
