= Mamqan =

City in East Azerbaijan province, Iran

Mamqan Persian: ممقان
- City
- Location within Iran
- Coordinates: 37°50′45″N 45°58′19″E
- Country: Iran
- Province: East Azerbaijan
- County: Center
- District: Mamqan

Population (2016)
  - Total: 11,892
- Time zone: UTC+3:30 (IRST)

Mamqan (Persian: ممقان) (Note: Also romanized as Mamaqān, Māmāqān, and Mamqān) is a city in, and the capital of, Mamqan District (Note: Formerly the Central District) in Azarshahr County, East Azerbaijan province, Iran. The previous capital of the district was the city of Azarshahr. Mamqan also serves as the administrative center for Shahrak Rural District. (Note: Formerly Khanamir Rural District) The previous capital of the rural district was the village of Khanamir. Mamqan is the world's largest producer of chickpeas.

== Demographics ==
=== Population ===
At the time of the 2006 National Census, the city's population was 10,872 in 3,258 households. The following census in 2011 counted 13,359 people in 3,606 households. The 2016 census measured the population of the city as 11,892 people in 3,937 households.
