= Majarshin =

Village in East Azerbaijan province, Iran

Majarshin Persian: مجارشين
- Village
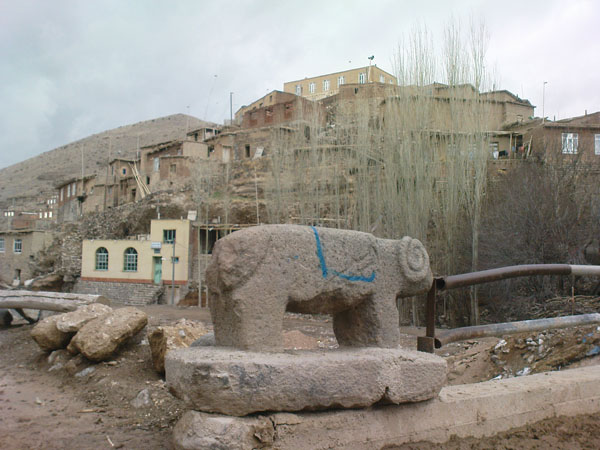
- The village of Majarshin

- Location within Iran
- Coordinates: 37°44′12″N 46°09′10″E
- Country: Iran
- Province: East Azerbaijan
- County: Osku
- District: Central
- Rural District: Gonbar

Population (2016)
  - Total: 1,037
- Time zone: UTC+3:30 (IRST)

Majarshin (Persian: مجارشين) (Note: Also romanized as Majāreshīn and Majārshīn) is a village in Gonbar Rural District of the Central District in Osku County, East Azerbaijan province, Iran.

Majarshin village is located in the foothills of Yeke Soura Majarshin village.

== Demographics ==
=== Population ===
At the time of the 2006 National Census, the village's population was 1,078 in 264 households. The following census in 2011 counted 1,122 people in 315 households. The 2016 census measured the population of the village as 1,034 people in 295 households.

== Geography and economy ==
Majarshin was originally Mirza Neshin (a place where the people of high rank of society mostly lived) and in Reza Shah Pahlavi's time of the policy of cultural assimilation, of which changing the name of cities was part, the name of village was changed. However, the residents of this village and surrounding villages apply the name of the village with its old dialect "Mirzeh Neshin" or "Mirza Neshin."

The main activities of its residents are in the areas of agriculture, horticulture, animal husbandry and carpet making. The main source of income for Majarshin is selling agricultural products such as nuts and raw rose. Potatoes represent the emblem of Majarshin. Walnut and willow Tabrizi are to be seen in the village. Livestock are present in the village due to the high meadows and postures, especially Suyukh Boulagh and Agh Valley in comparison with surrounding villages. Income resulting from the sale of surplus dairy products contribute to the economy of rural households.

Majarshin is a mountainous village with beautiful staircase home. The highest point of village is the Orian Mountain; the peak has a height of 2,850 m. An asphalt road connects the village with the town Osku and Azarshahr. Majarshin village location is so that makes it a top rating to the surrounding villages. This village is the confluence of two roads, Azarshahr to Gonbar and Osku to Gonbar.

== History ==
The historical cemetery of Magarshin, featuring tombstones inscribed in Arabic, indicates that the Arabic script has been utilized in the village since ancient times. This cemetery originates from the post-Islamic era.

In this village, the houses that are carved into the mountains, complete with niches, serve as a testament to the existence of life in this area in the distant past. These historical rock houses of Magarshin are referred to as Bushlar. The Magarshin Rock Mosque also dates back to the middle and late periods of Islamic history and was registered as one of the national monuments of Iran on February 25, 2007 with registration number 17506.
