= Ansarud =

Village in East Azerbaijan province, Iran

Ansarud Persian: عنصرود
- Village
- Location within Iran
- Coordinates: 37°48′56″N 46°18′31″E
- Country: Iran
- Province: East Azerbaijan
- County: Osku
- District: Central
- Rural District: Sahand

Population (2016)
  - Total: 1,418
- Time zone: UTC+3:30 (IRST)

Ansarud (Persian: عنصرود) (Note: Also romanized as ‘Anşrūd, Onsorood, and ‘Onşorūd; also known as Astāra, Āstārī, and A’stārī) is a village in Sahand Rural District of the Central District in Osku County, East Azerbaijan province, Iran.

== Demographics ==
=== Population ===
At the time of the 2006 National Census, the village's population was 1,378 in 337 households. The following census in 2011 counted 1,449 people in 421 households. The 2016 census measured the population of the village as 1,418 people in 442 households.
