= Mamqan District =

District in East Azerbaijan province, Iran

Mamqan District Persian: بخش ممقان
- District
- Location within Iran
- Coordinates: 37°50′N 45°59′E
- Country: Iran
- Province: East Azerbaijan
- County: Azarshahr
- Established: 1997
- Capital: Mamqan

Population (2016)
  - Total: 11,892
- Time zone: UTC+3:30 (IRST)

Mamqan District (Persian: بخش ممقان) (Note: Formerly the Central District (بخش مرکزی)) is in Azarshahr County, East Azerbaijan province, Iran. Its capital is the city of Mamqan. The previous capital of the district was the city of Azarshahr.

== Demographics ==
=== Population ===
At the time of the 2006 National Census, the district's population was 10,874 in 3,259 households. The following census in 2011 counted 13,365 people in 3,608 households. The 2016 census measured the population of the district as 11,892 inhabitants living in 3,937 households.

=== Administrative divisions ===
Mamqan District Population
Administrative Divisions	2006	2011	2016
Shahrak RD (Note: Formerly Khanamir Rural District)	(Note: Below reporting threshold)		0
Mamqan (city)	10,872	13,359	11,892
Total	10,874	13,365	11,892
RD = Rural District
