= Qebleh Daghi Rural District =

Rural district in East Azerbaijan province, Iran

Qebleh Daghi Rural District Persian: دهستان قبله داغي
- Rural District
- Location within Iran
- Coordinates: 37°43′N 45°48′E
- Country: Iran
- Province: East Azerbaijan
- County: Azarshahr
- District: Howmeh
- Established: 1987
- Capital: Nadilu

Population (2016)
  - Total: 8,239
- Time zone: UTC+3:30 (IRST)

Qebleh Daghi Rural District (Persian: دهستان قبله داغي) is in Howmeh District of Azarshahr County, East Azerbaijan province, Iran. Its capital is the village of Nadilu.

== Demographics ==
=== Population ===
At the time of the 2006 National Census, the rural district's population was 8,342 in 2,016 households. There were 8,659 inhabitants in 2,399 households at the following census of 2011. The 2016 census measured the population of the rural district as 8,239 in 2,498 households. The most populous of its 12 villages was Nadilu, with 3,436 people.

=== Other villages in the rural district ===
- Amir Dizaj
- Dinabad
- Haft Cheshmeh
- Kharaju
- Qadamgah
