= Sahand Rural District =

Rural district in East Azerbaijan province, Iran

Sahand Rural District Persian: دهستان سهند
- Rural District
- Location within Iran
- Coordinates: 37°51′N 46°13′E
- Country: Iran
- Province: East Azerbaijan
- County: Osku
- District: Central
- Established: 1987
- Seat: Esfanjan

Population (2016)
  - Total: 9,339
- Time zone: UTC+3:30 (IRST)

Sahand Rural District (Persian: دهستان سهند) is in the Central District of Osku County, East Azerbaijan province, Iran. Its capital is the village of Esfanjan.

== Demographics ==
=== Population ===
At the time of the 2006 National Census, the rural district's population was 9,480 in 2,625 households. There were 9,933 inhabitants in 3,060 households at the following census of 2011. The 2016 census measured the population of the rural district as 9,339 in 3,049 households. The most populous of its six villages was Esfanjan, with 3,544 people.

=== Other villages in the rural district ===
- Amqan
- Ansarud
- Eskandan
- Kahnamu
- Kandovan
