= Offshore Indus Basin =

Basin in offshore Pakistan

The offshore Indus Basin is one of the two basins in offshore Pakistan, the other one being the offshore Makran Basin. The Murray Ridge separates the two basins. The offshore Indus basin is approximately 120 to 140 kilometers wide and has an areal extent of ~20,000 square km.

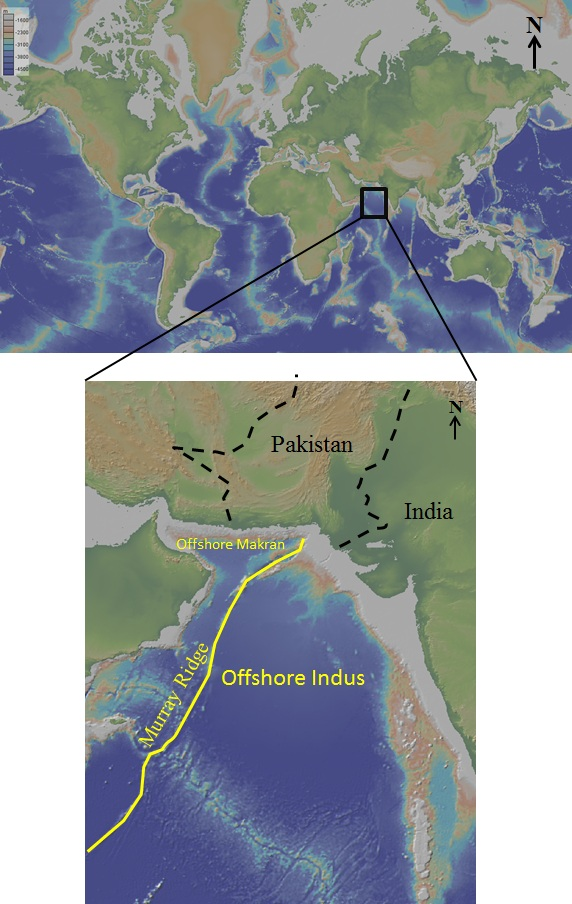
Location map of the Offshore Indus Basin, Pakistan

== Tectonic setting ==
=== Basin formation ===
The offshore Indus basin is a rift and passive margin basin which developed following the separation of the Indian Plate from Africa in the late Jurassic. During the Late Cretaceous, the separation of Madagascar from India occurred and was followed by rapid northward movement of the Indian plate. In the early Paleocene, the Indian plate passed over the Reunion hotspot. This event also led to the extrusion of large volcanic rocks, known as the Deccan Traps. During the Eocene, the Indian plate collided with the Eurasian plate, uplifting the Himalayas. Presence of the Middle Eocene sandstones in the distal Indus fan, which contain feldspar grains with an origin in or north of the Indus suture zone, is an evidence to the occurrence of this event. The Indian plate continues to collide with the Eurasian plate as shown by earthquakes in and around the Himalayas.

Seismic data in the offshore Indus basin show evidence of an early rift geometry below the Deccan volcanics. Imaging is hampered by the presence of volcanics, which partly infill the rifts and by the thick overlying Indus Fan section of Oligocene to Recent age. The precise age of the rifts is unknown but is interpreted as most likely a mid-Cretaceous to Paleocene age and associated with the break up of the Madagascar/Seychelles/Indo-Pakistan plate.

During the early post-rift phase, attached carbonate platforms of Paleocene and early Eocene age formed along the continental margin and detached platforms on volcanic seamounts within the basin. Between the carbonate banks, coeval pelagic sediment was deposited in the intervening structural lows. As the Indian plate drifted northwards away from the Reunion mantle hotspot, the basin subsided rapidly. This was accompanied by major clastic influx from the Indus river and leading to deposition of up to 9 km of Oligocene to Recent sediments.

=== Crustal structure and tectonic elements ===
Seismic and gravity data suggest that the underlying crust in the offshore Indus basin is of three types: continental, transitional and oceanic. Continental crust is interpreted for the area below the shelf and upper slope based on the presence of deep rift geometries on seismic lines. Transitional crust occurs on the slope in water depths of 1500–3000 m and is characterized by a prominent gravity low and a northeast-southwest-trending chain of seamounts of Late Cretaceous-Paleocene age. Crust in this region is interpreted to represent thinned continental crust which has been subsequently thickened by the intrusion of thick volcanic rocks by the process of igneous underplating. Further basinwards, the transitional crust is replaced by the oceanic crust characterized by a prominent gravity high and a well-imaged Moho reflection on seismic lines.

The northwest of the Murray ridge is a major plate boundary transform fault which formed in the Late Oligocene/Early Miocene in response to plate reorganization following the opening of the Gulf of Aden. Onlap of the Miocene and younger stratigraphy on the southeast side of the ridge confirms the age of the ridge and resultant hanging wall uplift. Motion along the Murray ridge bounding fault has resulted in the development of northwest-southeast-trending faults, folds and shale diapirs in the hanging wall. The Makran accretionary wedge, north of the Murray ridge, developed in response to the subduction of the Gulf of Oman oceanic crust beneath Eurasia from about 14 Ma onwards. The southern boundary of the offshore Indus basin is marked by the Saurashtra Arch. It is a volcanic high which extends eastwards into onshore India, coinciding with large outcrop of Deccan volcanics. In the offshore, the arch is cut by steep vertical faults interpreted as extensional faults associated with strike-slip movement along an east-west-trending transform fault marking the northern edge of the Arabian Sea oceanic crust. Two other features have been identified southeast of the Saurashtra Arch, the Laxmi Ridge and the Laxmi Basin. The Laxmi Ridge is interpreted as continental fragment and the Laxmi Basin is considered to be an area of extended continental crust respectively. The gravity and seismic data suggest that the Laxmi Ridge may represent an area of thinned continental crust which has been subsequently thickened by igneous underplating and the intrusion of thick volcanics similar to the transitional area in the offshore Indus basin.

=== Stratigraphy and sedimentation ===
==== Basin stratigraphy ====
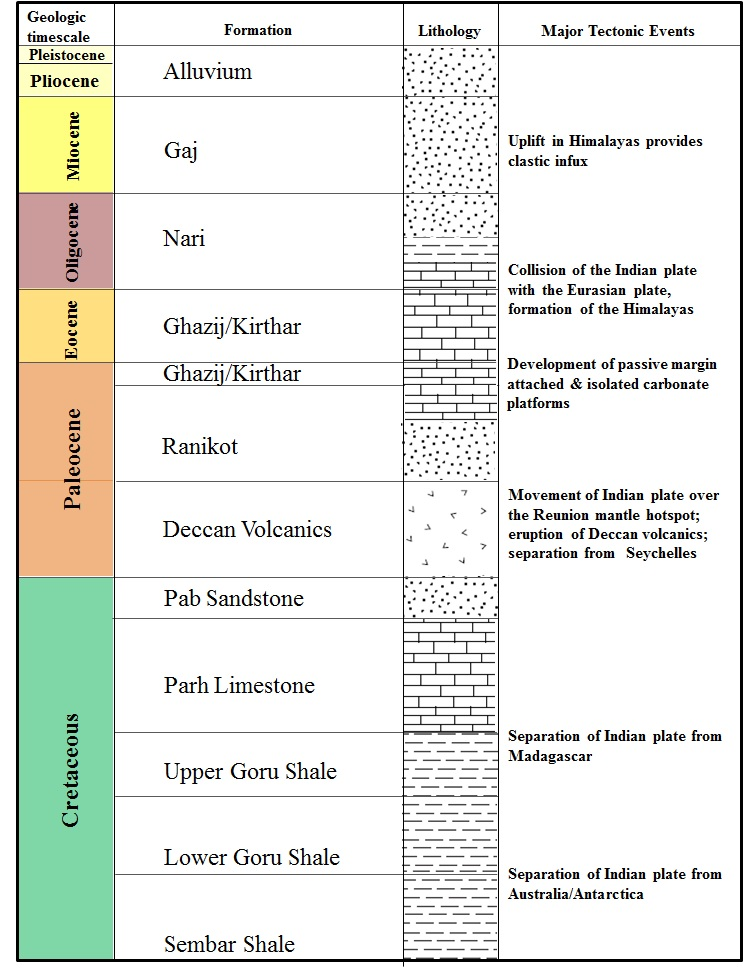
Stratigraphy of the Offshore Indus

Wells drilled on the continental shelf of the offshore Indus basin have been drilled down to Cretaceous rocks. The oldest formation penetrated is the Sembar Formation of Early Cretaceous. It is composed of shales. Onshore Sembar Formation is the major source rock, responsible for charging the sands of the Goru Formation. Sembar is overlain by Goru Formation. Goru is subdivided into Lower and Upper Goru. Lower Goru is sandy onshore and a proven reservoir. Offshore, however, it shales out. Upper Goru is a massive shale and was deposited during Late Cretaceous. It is overlain by Parh Limestone, Mughalkot (limestone interbedded with shale) and Pab Sandstone Formations, deposited during Late Cretaceous. Deccan volcanics of the Paleocene overlie the Cretaceous Pab Sandstone. These are overlain by Ranikot Formation (majorly sandstone), also Paleocene in age. Eocene carbonates, Ghazij/Kirthar lie on top of the Paleocene Ranikot Formation. Nari (Oligocene in age), Gaj (Miocene) and recent sediments, were brought down by the Indus river after the Himalayan uplift and deposited over the Eocene carbonates.

==== The Indus fan and its channel-levee systems ====
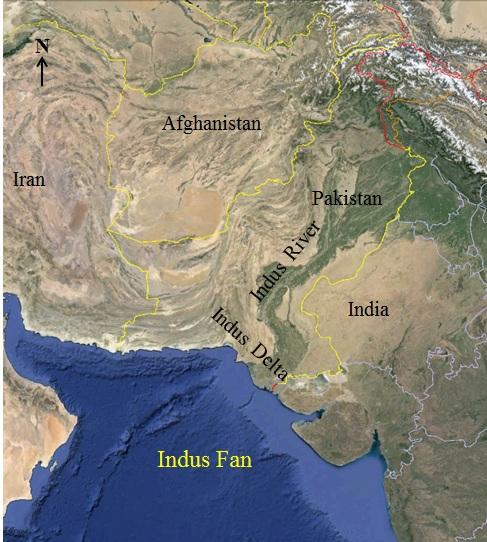
The Indus Fan

One of the most significant depositional feature of the offshore Indus basin is the Indus Fan. It is the second largest fan system in the world after the Bengal fan between India, Bangladesh and the Andaman Islands. The Indus fan was deposited in an unconfined setting on the continental slope, rise and basin floor, covering much of the Arabian Sea. The entire fan extends over an area of 110,000 square kilometers with greater than 9 km of sediment accumulating near the toe-of-slope.

Fan sedimentation is estimated to have begun at the end of the Oligocene or beginning of the Miocene, during a period of faster Himalayan exhumation, possibly linked to Monsoon intensification.

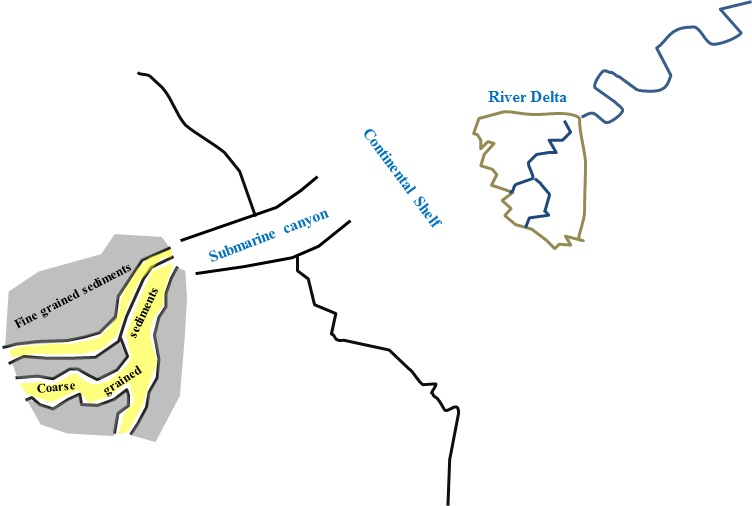
Cartoon sketch of a deep sea fan channel-levee system (CLS)

The upper Indus Fan, both ancient and recent, consists some of the largest channel-levee systems (CLS). These channel-levee systems act as conduits for carrying and depositing sediments into the deeper part of the basin. The coarser grained sediments are deposited in the channel belts whereas the finer grained silts and clays are deposited along the levees. This arrangement of sediments is ideal for stratigraphic plays and that is why these channel-levee systems are of utmost importance to the petroleum industry.

=== Hydrocarbon potential ===
The offshore Indus basin is significantly under-explored. To-date only 12 wells have been drilled in the offshore Indus basin, out of which only 3 were drilled in the deep sea. All of these have been unsuccessful attempts. Some of these wells encountered high pressures in the Miocene section. Gas shows and non-commercial gas quantities were also reported in the Miocene strata of most wells.

As far as the petroleum system is concerned, presence and effectiveness of the reservoir and trap are of low risk. The channel and sheet sandstones of Miocene and Plio-Pleistocene are good potential reservoirs. Oligocene clastic rocks can also act as reservoir rocks in distal fan facies. Four types of traps have been identified in offshore Indus: an extensional rollover anticline trend in the upper slope, drape structures over the Eocene carbonate banks and seamounts, stratigraphic traps formed by sands pinching out against the Murray Ridge and folds associated with the Murray Ridge shear faults and shale diapirs.

Presence of seal may be an issue in some areas due to erosional channels. The source rock is questionable, as Sembar Formation, which is a proven source onshore, is too deep offshore and most likely overmature to charge the reservoirs. Paleocene-Eocene carbonates can be the potential source rocks in the offshore Indus basin. However, this needs to be proved in terms of both quality and quantity.
