= Bavil-e Olya =

Village in East Azerbaijan province, Iran

Bavil-e Olya Persian: باويل عليا
- Village
- Location within Iran
- Coordinates: 37°55′41″N 46°06′09″E
- Country: Iran
- Province: East Azerbaijan
- County: Osku
- District: Central
- Rural District: Bavil

Population (2016)
  - Total: 426
- Time zone: UTC+3:30 (IRST)

Bavil-e Olya (Persian: باويل عليا) (Note: Also romanized as Bāvīl-e ‘Olyā) is a village in Bavil Rural District of the Central District in Osku County, East Azerbaijan province, Iran.

== Demographics ==
=== Population ===
At the time of the 2006 National Census, the village's population was 542 in 189 households. The following census in 2011 counted 469 people in 168 households. The 2016 census measured the population of the village as 426 people in 156 households.
