= Qazi Jahan Rural District =

Rural district in East Azerbaijan province, Iran

Qazi Jahan Rural District Persian: دهستان قاضي جهان
- Rural District
- Location within Iran
- Coordinates: 37°46′N 45°58′E
- Country: Iran
- Province: East Azerbaijan
- County: Azarshahr
- District: Howmeh
- Established: 1990
- Capital: Qazi Jahan

Population (2016)
  - Total: 6,083
- Time zone: UTC+3:30 (IRST)

Qazi Jahan Rural District (Persian: دهستان قاضي جهان) is in Howmeh District of Azarshahr County, East Azerbaijan province, Iran. Its capital is the village of Qazi Jahan.

== Demographics ==
=== Population ===
At the time of the 2006 National Census, the rural district's population was 5,853 in 1,576 households. There were 6,183 inhabitants in 1,918 households at the following census of 2011. The 2016 census measured the population of the rural district as 6,083 in 1,978 households. The most populous of its four villages was Qazi Jahan, with 3,359 people.

=== Other villages in the rural district ===
- Akhi Jahan
- Dizaj-e Aqa Hasan
- Ghallehzar
