= Kalahjah =

Village in East Azerbaijan province, Iran

Kalahjah Persian: کَلَجاه
- Village
- Location within Iran
- Coordinates: 37°55′55″N 46°05′12″E
- Country: Iran
- Province: East Azerbaijan
- County: Osku
- District: Central
- Rural District: Bavil

Population (2016)
  - Total: 1,593
- Time zone: UTC+3:30 (IRST)

Kalahjah (Persian: كله جاه) (Note: Also romanized as Kalahjāh; also known as Kalajāh) is a village in, and the capital of, Bavil Rural District in the Central District of Osku County, East Azerbaijan province, Iran.

== Demographics ==
=== Population ===
At the time of the 2006 National Census, the village's population was 1,922 in 602 households. The following census in 2011 counted 1,802 people in 599 households. The 2016 census measured the population of the village as 1,593 people in 589 households.
