= Bavil-e Sofla =

Village in East Azerbaijan province, Iran

Bavil-e Sofla Persian: باويل سفلي
- Village
- Location within Iran
- Coordinates: 37°55′49″N 46°05′55″E
- Country: Iran
- Province: East Azerbaijan
- County: Osku
- District: Central
- Rural District: Bavil

Population (2016)
  - Total: 1,332
- Time zone: UTC+3:30 (IRST)

Bavil-e Sofla (Persian: باويل سفلي) (Note: Also romanized as Bāvīl-e Soflá) is a village in Bavil Rural District of the Central District in Osku County, East Azerbaijan province, Iran.

== Demographics ==
=== Population ===
At the time of the 2006 National Census, the village's population was 1,502 in 475 households. The following census in 2011 counted 1,541 people in 506 households. The 2016 census measured the population of the village as 1,332 people in 465 households.
