= Sailaab =

Sailaab may refer to:

- Sailaab (1956 film), a Bollywood film
- Sailaab (1990 film), a Bollywood suspense thriller film
- Sailaab (TV series), an Indian television series

== See also ==
- Silab (disambiguation)
