= Teymurlu Rural District =

Rural district in East Azerbaijan province, Iran

Teymurlu Rural District Persian: دهستان تيمورلو
- Rural District
- Location within Iran
- Coordinates: 37°50′N 45°46′E
- Country: Iran
- Province: East Azerbaijan
- County: Azarshahr
- District: Gugan
- Established: 1987
- Capital: Teymurlu

Population (2016)
  - Total: 2,673
- Time zone: UTC+3:30 (IRST)

Teymurlu Rural District (Persian: دهستان تيمورلو) (Note: Formerly Qazi Jahan Rural District (دهستان قاضي جهان)) is in Gugan District of Azarshahr County, East Azerbaijan province, Iran. It is administered from the city of Teymurlu.

== Demographics ==
=== Population ===
At the time of the 2006 National Census, the rural district's population was 7,723 in 2,075 households. There were 7,998 inhabitants in 2,502 households at the following census of 2011. The 2016 census measured the population of the rural district as 2,673 in 791 households. The most populous of its three villages was Qaraghil, with 1,723 people.

=== Other villages in the rural district ===
- Khaslu
