= Kukhalu, Bostanabad =

Kukhalu كوخالو
- Village
- Location within Iran
- Coordinates: 37°35′57″N 47°11′14″E
- Country: Iran
- Province: East Azerbaijan
- County: Bostanabad
- Bakhsh: Tekmeh Dash
- Rural District: Abbas-e Sharqi

Population (2006)
  - Total: 39
- Time zone: UTC+3:30 (IRST)
  - Summer (DST): UTC+4:30 (IRDT)

Kukhalu (Persian: كوخالو, also Romanized as Kūkhālū; also known as Kūchālū) is a village in Abbas-e Sharqi Rural District, Tekmeh Dash District, Bostanabad County, East Azerbaijan Province, Iran. At the 2006 census, its population was 39, in 9 families.

The village of Koohalou or Kohlali (Azeri language) is located 60 km from the city center and 100 km from Tabriz and 45 km from Bostanabad.

Being part of the village of Mahal, the eastern province of Abbas is located in the central part of Qara-Chaman and the Ticman Dashe district.

The Kukhalu is Turkish in the name of the Khodkah (Qadkhoda), where the place of residence of the code of the gods was.

The Koohlou is located on the slopes of the Boucush Quays.

This village is located along the Tehran-Tabriz transit road.

Most of the villagers have settled in Karaj and the countryside.

The village of Kohkhalu has various alleys such as:

1- Valley which is the water of the Kahhaloo valley, which originates from the Gomali Springs,

2- Mojtaba Strait Th

3. Strait

4. You are a Cuckoo in the mountain range of Ghorokhanah, and the commandment of Mount Heidar Baba Shahriar for the children of the 10th.

The decoration of the mosque is at the beginning of it. If you are a former neighborhoods, and other houses and schools in that area. Harmanlar is a village on the slopes of Ghorokhanah Mountain.

In 1349, the Cuckoo had a plumbing system and in 1979 it had electricity.

In 1395 it was also supplied with gas.
