= Karkheh Dam =

Dam in Khuzestan, Iran

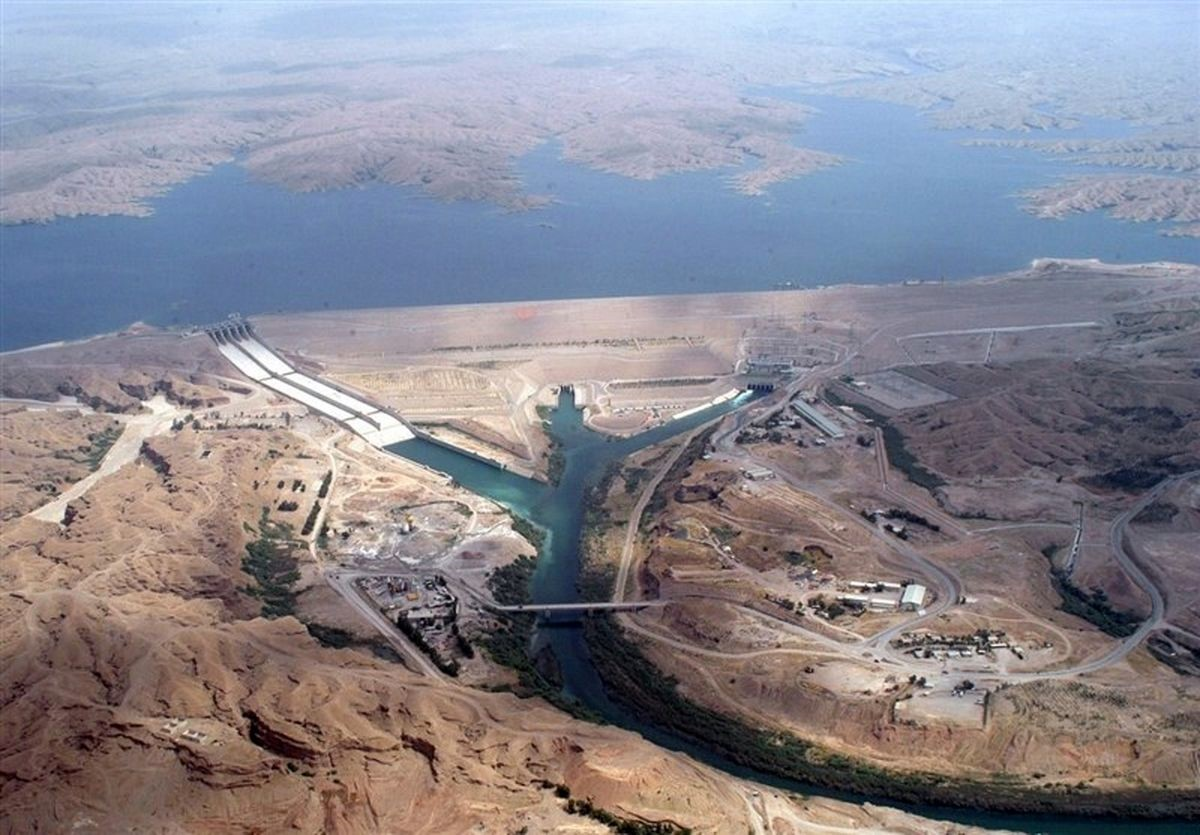

- Location of the Karkheh Dam in Iran
- Interactive map of Karkheh Dam
- Country: Iran
- Location: khuzestan-Andimeshk
- Coordinates: 32°29′21″N 48°07′36″E
- Purpose: Irrigation, Flood control, Power
- Status: Operational
- Construction began: 1992
- Opening date: 2001
- Construction cost: US$700 million
- Owners: Iran Water & Power Resources Development Co.

Dam and spillways
- Type of dam: Embankment dam
- Impounds: Karkheh River
- Height (foundation): 127 m (417 ft)
- Length: 3,030 m (9,941 ft)
- Width (crest): 12 m (39 ft)
- Width (base): 1,100 m (3,609 ft)
- Spillway capacity: 18,260 m^{3}/s (645,000 cu ft/s)

Reservoir
- Total capacity: 5,900,000,000 m^{3} (4,800,000 acre⋅ft)
- Catchment area: 42,000 km^{2} (16,000 sq mi)
- Surface area: 162 km^{2} (63 sq mi)

Power Station
- Turbines: 3 × 140 MW
- Installed capacity: 520 MW
- Annual generation: 934 GWh

The Karkheh Dam (Persian: سد کرخه) is a large multi-purpose earthen embankment dam built in Iran on the Karkheh River in 2001 by the contractor of Khatam al-Anbiya Construction Central Headquarters of the Islamic Revolutionary Guards Corps (IRGC).

The dam is in the northwestern province of Khūzestān, the closest city being Andimeshk to the east. It is 127 metres (417 ft) high and has a reservoir capacity of 5.9 billion cubic meters. The Karkheh Dam is designed to irrigate 320,000 hectares (790,000 acres) of land, produce 520 MW of hydro-electricity and prevent downstream floods.

Mean annual electricity generation is approximately 700 GWh. Based on IWPCO records, dam's power plant generated total of 4,941 GWh electricity during 2002–2008. In 2014 the maximum water in the reservoir of the dam reached 1,900,000,000 m^{3} (1,500,000 acre⋅ft) and it is estimated that this number will be even less in 2015.

Hawizeh Marshes is affected by the torrential sediments of rivers such as Tigris and Euphrates in Iraq and Karkheh in Iran. Karkheh dam caused to decline the quantity of entering water to the wetland and following it, the wetland extend has been reduced remarkably.

== Construction ==
In 1956, studies began on the Karkheh Dam by the American company Development and Resources Corporation, which was headed by David E. Lilienthal, the former chairman of the Tennessee Valley Authority (TVA). In 1990, the final studies and design were completed by Mahab Ghodss Consulting Engineers, directed by master engineer Mohammad Soleymani. The engineering division of the Islamic Revolutionary Guards Corps (IRGC) started construction on the Karkheh Dam in 1992 and the dam was complete in 2001. During construction, 120 contractual and over eight consultative companies worked on the dam; 5,000 workers constructed the dam and 40 were killed in the process.

== See also ==
- Dams in Iran
- Hawizeh Marshes
- Seimare Dam
