= Dastjerd Rural District (Azarshahr County) =

Rural district in East Azerbaijan province, Iran

Dastjerd Rural District Persian: دهستان دستجرد
- Rural District
- Location within Iran
- Coordinates: 37°46′N 45°50′E
- Country: Iran
- Province: East Azerbaijan
- County: Azarshahr
- District: Gugan
- Established: 2000
- Capital: Dastjerd

Population (2016)
  - Total: 5,083
- Time zone: UTC+3:30 (IRST)

Dastjerd Rural District (Persian: دهستان دستجرد) is in Gugan District of Azarshahr County, East Azerbaijan province, Iran. Its capital is the village of Dastjerd.

== Demographics ==
=== Population ===
At the time of the 2006 National Census, the rural district's population was 4,944 in 1,289 households. There were 5,561 inhabitants in 1,698 households at the following census of 2011. The 2016 census measured the population of the rural district as 5,083 in 1,638 households. The most populous of its six villages was Firuz Salar, with 2,582 people.

=== Other villages in the rural district ===
- Qaleh-ye Sheykh
- Qeshlaq-e Piazi
