= Dinabad, Hormozgan =

Dinabad دين آباد
- Village
- Location within Iran
- Coordinates: 28°07′12″N 56°44′22″E
- Country: Iran
- Province: Hormozgan
- County: Hajjiabad
- Bakhsh: Ahmadi
- Rural District: Kuh Shah

Population (2006)
  - Total: 59
- Time zone: UTC+3:30 (IRST)
  - Summer (DST): UTC+4:30 (IRDT)

Dinabad (Persian: دين آباد, also Romanized as Dīnābād; also known as Dīnābād Kūh) is a village in Kuh Shah Rural District, Ahmadi District, Hajjiabad County, Hormozgan Province, Iran. At the 2006 census, its population was 59, in 16 families.
