= Bavil Rural District =

Rural district in East Azerbaijan province, Iran

Bavil Rural District Persian: دهستان باويل
- Rural District
- Location within Iran
- Coordinates: 37°54′N 46°06′E
- Country: Iran
- Province: East Azerbaijan
- County: Osku
- District: Central
- Established: 1987
- Capital: Kalahjah

Population (2016)
  - Total: 9,397
- Time zone: UTC+3:30 (IRST)

Bavil Rural District (Persian: دهستان باويل) is in the Central District of Osku County, East Azerbaijan province, Iran. Its capital is the village of Kalahjah.

== Demographics ==
=== Population ===
At the time of the 2006 National Census, the rural district's population was 23,318 in 6,801 households. There were 9,792 inhabitants in 3,074 households at the following census of 2011. The 2016 census measured the population of the rural district as 9,397 in 3,169 households. The most populous of its six villages was Bayram, with 2,982 people.

=== Other villages in the rural district ===
- Bavil-e Olya
- Bavil-e Sofla
- Dizaj
- Kushan-e Mirza Rahim
