= Teymurlu, Azarshahr =

City in East Azerbaijan province, Iran

Teymurlu Persian: تيمورلو
- City
- Nickname: Tamirli
- Location within Iran
- Coordinates: 37°48′22″N 45°53′59″E
- Country: Iran
- Province: East Azerbaijan
- County: Azarshahr
- District: Gugan
- Established as a city: 2011

Population (2016)
  - Total: 5,375
- Time zone: UTC+3:30 (IRST)

Teymurlu (Persian: تيمورلو) (Note: Also romanized as Teymūrlū) is a city in Gugan District of Azarshahr County, East Azerbaijan province, Iran, serving as the administrative center for Teymurlu Rural District. (Note: Formerly Qazi Jahan Rural District)

== Demographics ==
=== Population ===
At the time of the 2006 National Census, Teymurlu's population was 1,460 households, when it was a village in Teymurlu Rural District. The following census in 2011 counted 5,422 people in 1,713 households. The 2016 census measured the population as 5,375 people in 1,796 households, by which time the village had been converted to a city.

== Economy ==
The main agricultural product in Teymurlu is garlic.

The city of Teymurlu has high agricultural, industrial, economic and tourism capacities and potential. The Teymurlu garlic market is a place for buying and selling garlic produced in most of the northwestern regions of the country. Farmers who are engaged in garlic cultivation in different cities such as Ajab Shir, Miandoab and Shahin Dezh bring their garlic to Teymourlu market for sale in two forms, herb and hand-picked.

The daily exchange volume of garlic in Teymurlu market is around 900 tons, raw sale is one of the main problems of Teymurlu farmers and without a doubt, farmers' economy is captured by "raw sale" of products.

In this regard, the Teymourlu Garlic Festival is held every year with the title "Teymurlu, the capital of Iran's garlic" in order to promote the market of this valuable product.

This city is one of the most fertile cities in East Azerbaijan province, and its products include garlic, onions and potatoes. It is also considered the center of buying and selling agricultural products of the region, and there are many transportation companies. A large number of workers are working in this city.

Also, carpet weaving is one of the most common jobs in this city.
