= Silab, Kohgiluyeh and Boyer-Ahmad =

Silab سيلاب
- Village
- Location within Iran
- Coordinates: 31°22′47″N 50°34′43″E
- Country: Iran
- Province: Kohgiluyeh and Boyer-Ahmad
- County: Boyer-Ahmad
- Bakhsh: Margown
- Rural District: Zilayi

Population (2006)
  - Total: 108
- Time zone: UTC+3:30 (IRST)
  - Summer (DST): UTC+4:30 (IRDT)

Silab (Persian: سيلاب, also romanized as Sīlāb) is a village in Zilayi Rural District, Margown District, Boyer-Ahmad County, Kohgiluyeh and Boyer-Ahmad Province, Iran. At the 2006 census, its population was 108, in 19 families.
