= Sailab-cheni =

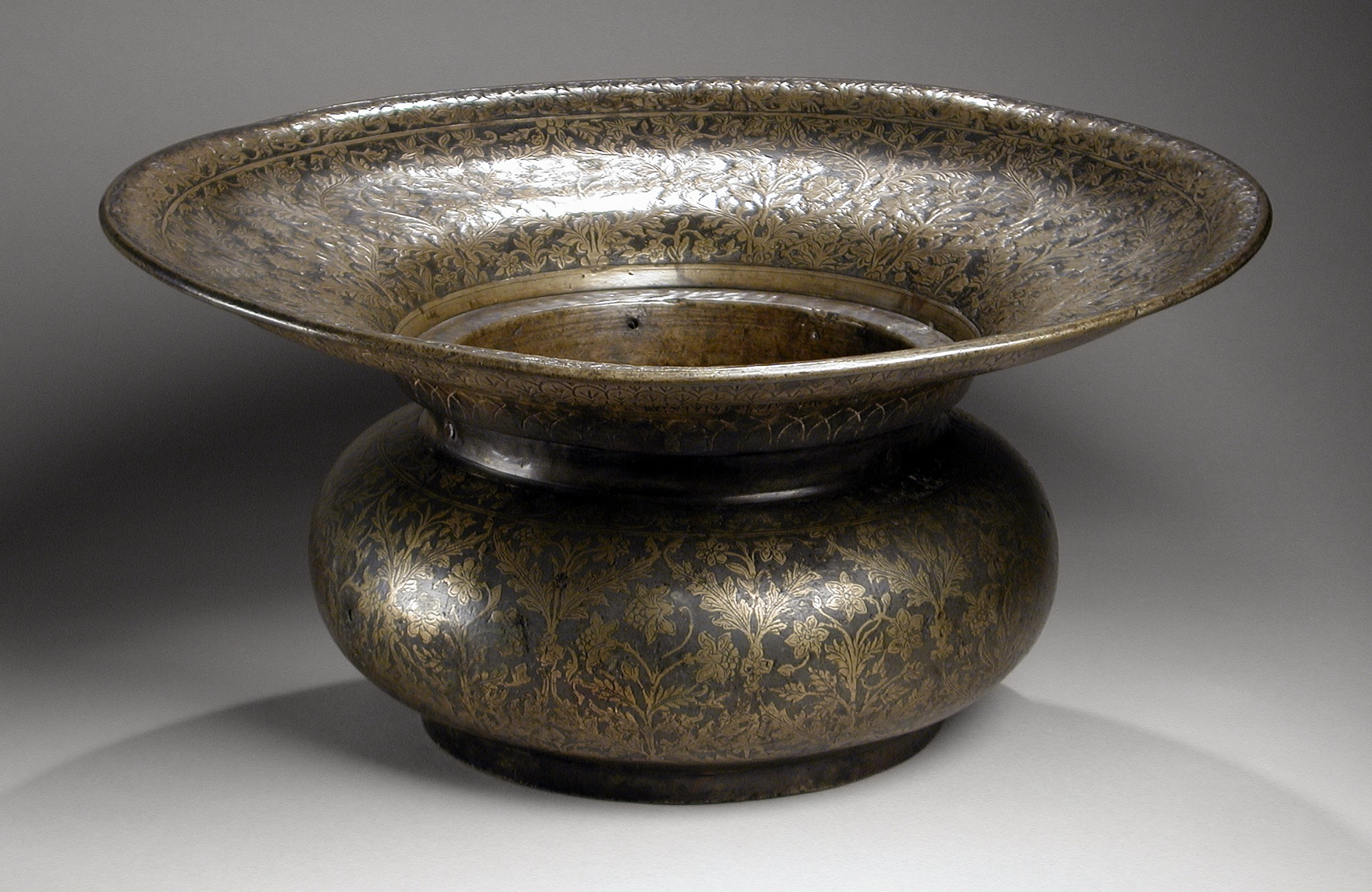
A 17th century basin of Mughal Empire, displayed at the Los Angeles County Museum of Art

A sailab-cheni, sailab-chini or chelamchi is a kind of portable metal basin with flat surface. It is placed in front of a person after meals for washing the hands. It is traditionally offered to dignified guests. In India it is used in traditional families of Hyderabad, India and among the Dawoodi Bohra community.
