= Gugan =

City in East Azerbaijan province, Iran

Gugan Persian: گوگان
- City
- Location within Iran
- Coordinates: 37°46′56″N 45°54′16″E
- Country: Iran
- Province: East Azerbaijan
- County: Azarshahr
- District: Gugan

Population (2016)
  - Total: 11,742
- Time zone: UTC+3:30 (IRST)

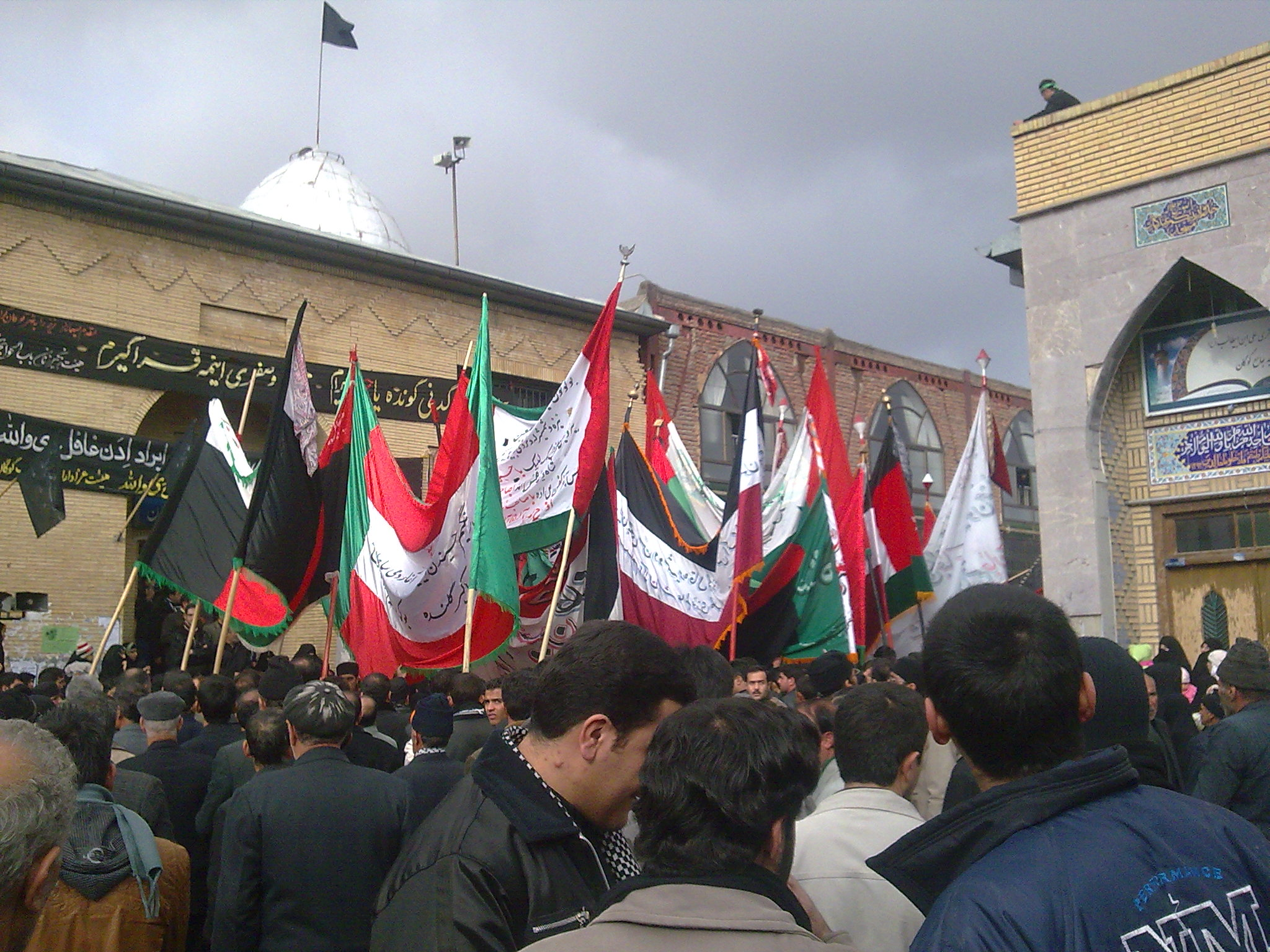

Gugan (Persian: گوگان) (Note: Also romanized as Gāvgān and Gūgān; also known as Gāvkān) is a city in, and the capital of, Gugan District in Azarshahr County, East Azerbaijan province, Iran.

== Demographics ==
=== Population ===
At the time of the 2006 National Census, the city's population was 10,949 in 3,109 households. The following census in 2011 counted 11,395 people in 3,564 households. The 2016 census measured the population of the city as 11,742 people in 3,892 households.
