= Gonbar Rural District =

Rural district in East Azerbaijan province, Iran

Gonbar Rural District Persian: دهستان گنبر
- Rural District
- Location within Iran
- Coordinates: 37°46′N 46°12′E
- Country: Iran
- Province: East Azerbaijan
- County: Osku
- District: Central
- Established: 1987
- Capital: Arbat

Population (2016)
  - Total: 7,763
- Time zone: UTC+3:30 (IRST)

Gonbar Rural District (Persian: دهستان گنبر) is in the Central District of Osku County, East Azerbaijan province, Iran. Its capital is the village of Arbat.

== Demographics ==
=== Population ===
At the time of the 2006 National Census, the rural district's population was 7,315 in 1,554 households. There were 7,704 inhabitants in 2,012 households at the following census of 2011. The 2016 census measured the population of the rural district as 7,763 in 2,255 households. The most populous of its 11 villages was Gonbar, with 3,460 people.

=== Other villages in the rural district ===
- Kordabad
- Majarshin
