= Shiramin Rural District =

Rural district in East Azerbaijan province, Iran

Shiramin Rural District Persian: دهستان شيرامين
- Rural District
- Location within Iran
- Coordinates: 37°38′N 45°46′E
- Country: Iran
- Province: East Azerbaijan
- County: Azarshahr
- District: Howmeh
- Established: 1987
- Capital: Shiramin

Population (2016)
  - Total: 7,550
- Time zone: UTC+3:30 (IRST)

Shiramin Rural District (Persian: دهستان شيرامين) is in Howmeh District of Azarshahr County, East Azerbaijan province, Iran. Its capital is the village of Shiramin.

== Demographics ==
=== Population ===
At the time of the 2006 National Census, the rural district's population was 7,862 in 2,126 households. There were 7,933 inhabitants in 2,422 households at the following census of 2011. The 2016 census measured the population of the rural district as 7,550 in 2,432 households. The most populous of its nine villages was Shiramin, with 3,252 people.

=== Other villages in the rural district ===
- Alvanaq
- Dashkasan
- Khaneqah
- Seylab
