= Yengejeh Rural District =

Rural district in East Azerbaijan province, Iran

Yengejeh Rural District Persian: دهستان ینگجه
- Rural District
- Location within Iran
- Coordinates: 37°44′N 46°05′E
- Country: Iran
- Province: East Azerbaijan
- County: Azarshahr
- District: Howmeh
- Established: 2003
- Capital: Yengejeh

Population (2016)
  - Total: 6,785
- Time zone: UTC+3:30 (IRST)

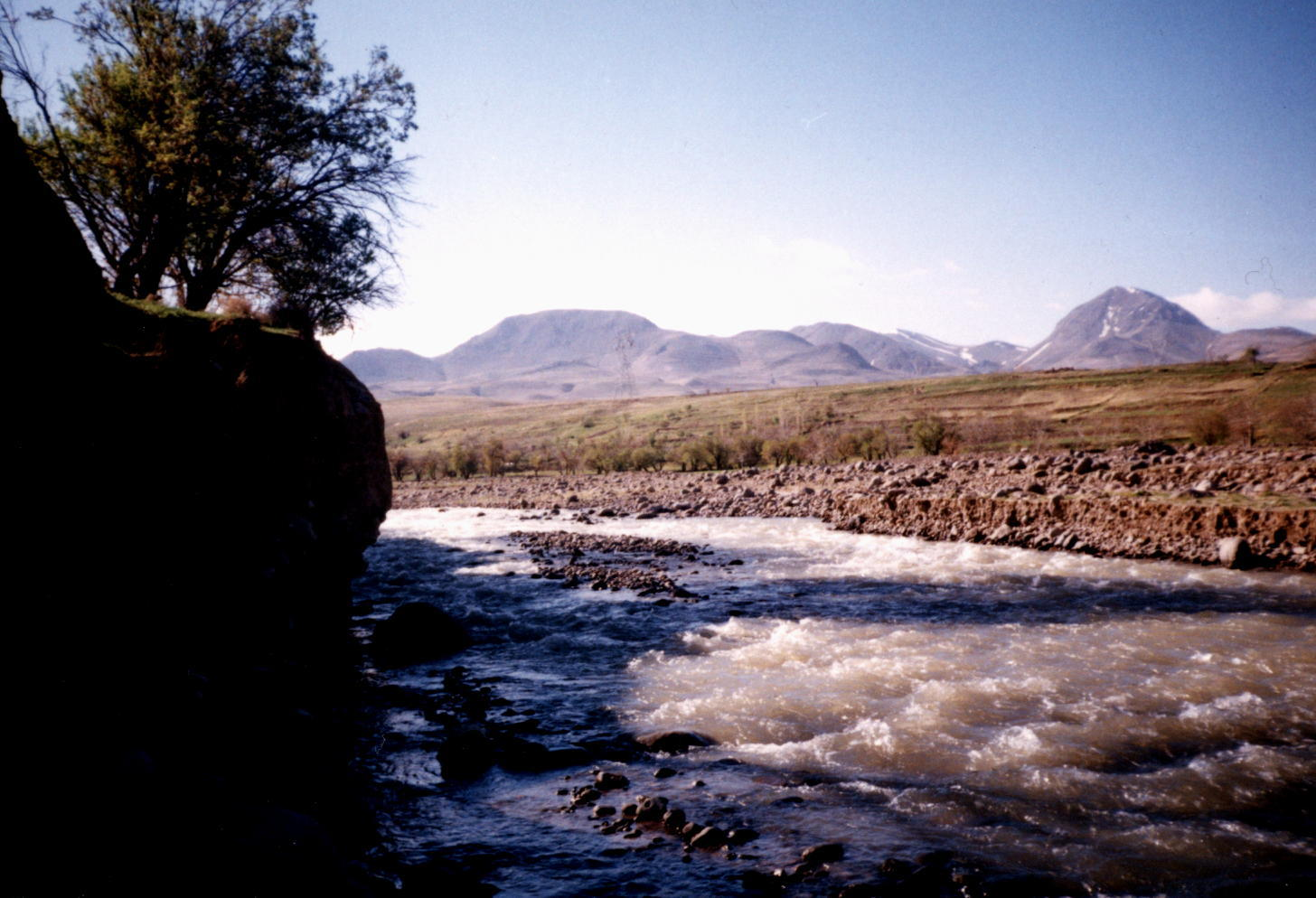
Selchai River in Azarshahr, taken from the area of Yangjeh Rural District.

Yengejeh Rural District (Persian: دهستان ینگجه) is in Howmeh District of Azarshahr County, East Azerbaijan province, Iran. Its capital is the village of Yengejeh.

== Demographics ==
=== Population ===
At the time of the 2006 National Census, the rural district's population was 6,264 in 1,553 households. There were 6,567 inhabitants in 1,890 households at the following census of 2011. The 2016 census measured the population of the rural district as 6,785 in 2,058 households. The most populous of its 10 villages was Khanamir, with 2,381 people.

=== Other villages in the rural district ===
- Dash Almalu
- Seghayesh
