= Gugan District =

District in East Azerbaijan province, Iran

Gugan District Persian: بخش گوگان
- District
- Location within Iran
- Coordinates: 37°48′N 45°46′E
- Country: Iran
- Province: East Azerbaijan
- County: Azarshahr
- Established: 1997
- Capital: Gugan

Population (2016)
  - Total: 24,873
- Time zone: UTC+3:30 (IRST)

Gugan District (Persian: بخش گوگان) is in Azarshahr County, East Azerbaijan province, Iran. Its capital is the city of Gugan.

== History ==
The village of Teymurlu was converted to a city in 2011.

== Demographics ==
=== Population ===
At the time of the 2006 National Census, the district's population was 23,616 in 6,473 households. The following census in 2011 counted 24,954 people in 7,764 households. The 2016 census measured the population of the district as 24,873 inhabitants living in 8,117 households.

=== Administrative divisions ===
Gugan District Population
Administrative Divisions	2006	2011	2016
Dastjerd RD	4,944	5,561	5,083
Teymurlu RD (Note: Formerly Qazi Jahan Rural District)	7,723	7,998	2,673
Gugan (city)	10,949	11,395	11,742
Teymurlu (city)			5,375
Total	23,616	24,954	24,873
RD = Rural District
