= Central District (Osku County) =

District in East Azerbaijan province, Iran

Central District (Osku County) Persian: بخش مرکزی شهرستان اسکو
- District
- Location within Iran
- Coordinates: 37°50′N 46°10′E
- Country: Iran
- Province: East Azerbaijan
- County: Osku
- Established: 1997
- Capital: Osku

Population (2016)
  - Total: 127,452
- Time zone: UTC+3:30 (IRST)

The Central District of Osku County (Persian: بخش مرکزی شهرستان اسکو) is in East Azerbaijan province, Iran. Its capital is the city of Osku.

== History ==
The village of Sahand was converted to a city in 2008.

== Demographics ==
=== Population ===
At the time of the 2006 census, the district's population was 56,253 in 15,908 households. The following census in 2011 counted 69,116 people in 21,041 households. The 2016 census measured the population of the district as 127,452 inhabitants in 40,586 households.

=== Administrative divisions ===
Central District (Osku County) Population
Administrative Divisions	2006	2011	2016
Bavil RD	23,318	9,792	9,397
Gonbar RD	7,315	7,704	7,763
Sahand RD	9,480	9,933	9,339
Osku (city)	16,140	16,983	18,459
Sahand (city)		24,704	82,494
Total	56,253	69,116	127,452
RD = Rural District
