= Howmeh District =

District in East Azerbaijan province, Iran

Howmeh District Persian: بخش حومه
- District
- Location within Iran
- Coordinates: 37°41′N 45°49′E
- Country: Iran
- Province: East Azerbaijan
- County: Ajab Shir
- Established: 2003
- Capital: Azarshahr

Population (2016)
  - Total: 73,544
- Time zone: UTC+3:30 (IRST)

Howmeh District (Persian: بخش حومه) is in Azarshahr County, East Azerbaijan province, Iran. Its capital is the city of Azarshahr. The previous capital of the district was the village of Nadilu.

== Demographics ==
=== Population ===
At the time of the 2006 National Census, the district's population was 64,796 in 17,125 households. The following census in 2011 counted 69,260 people in 20,456 households. The 2016 census measured the population of the district as 73,544 inhabitants living in 23,309 households.

=== Administrative divisions ===
Howmeh District population
Administrative divisions	2006	2011	2016
Qazi Jahan RD	5,853	6,183	6,083
Qebleh Daghi RD	8,342	8,659	8,239
Shiramin RD	7,862	7,933	7,550
Yengejeh RD	6,264	6,567	6,785
Azarshahr (city)	36,475	39,918	44,887
Total	64,796	69,260	73,544
RD = rural district
