= Azarshahr County =

County in East Azerbaijan province, Iran

Azarshahr County Persian: شهرستان آذرشهر
- County
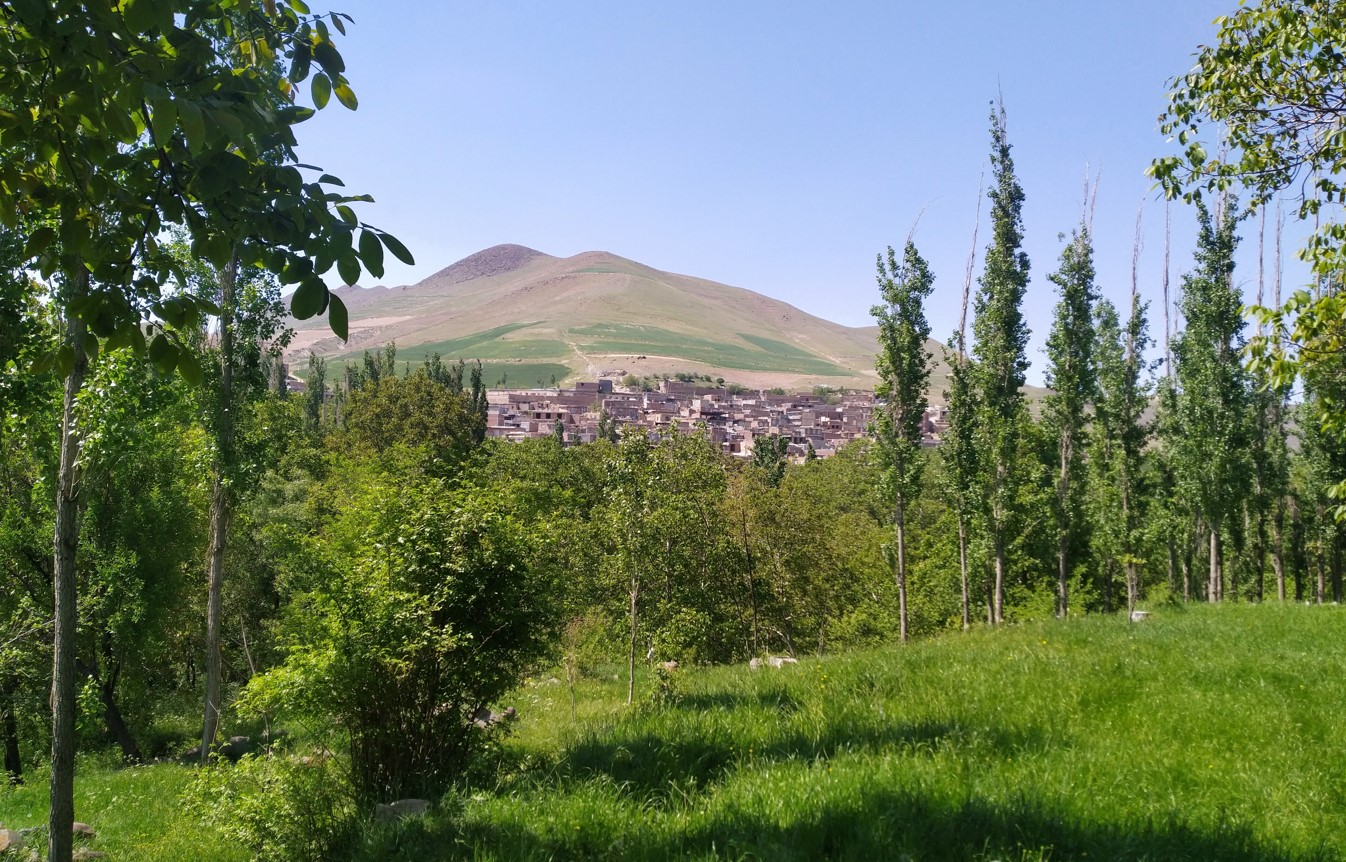
- The village of Amir Dizaj

- Location of Azarshahr County in East Azerbaijan province (center left, pink)

- Location of East Azerbaijan province in Iran
- Coordinates: 37°43′N 45°48′E
- Country: Iran
- Province: East Azerbaijan
- Established: 1997
- Capital: Azarshahr
- Districts: Howmeh, Gugan, Mamqan

Population (2016)
  - Total: 110,311
- Time zone: UTC+3:30 (IRST)

Azarshahr County (Persian: شهرستان آذرشهر) is in East Azerbaijan province, Iran. Its capital is the city of Azarshahr.

== History ==
The village of Teymurlu was converted to a city in 2011.

== Demographics ==
=== Population ===
At the time of the 2006 National Census, the county's population was 99,286 in 26,857 households. The following census in 2011 counted 107,579 people in 31,812 households. The 2016 census measured the population of the county as 110,311 in 35,364 households.

=== Administrative divisions ===
Azarshahr County's population history and administrative structure over three consecutive censuses are shown in the following table.

Azarshahr County Population
| Administrative Divisions | 2006 | 2011 | 2016 |
|---|---|---|---|
| Howmeh District | 64,796 | 69,260 | 73,544 |
| Qazi Jahan RD | 5,853 | 6,183 | 6,083 |
| Qebleh Daghi RD | 8,342 | 8,659 | 8,239 |
| Shiramin RD | 7,862 | 7,933 | 7,550 |
| Yengejeh RD | 6,264 | 6,567 | 6,785 |
| Azarshahr (city) | 36,475 | 39,918 | 44,887 |
| Gugan District | 23,616 | 24,954 | 24,873 |
| Dastjerd RD | 4,944 | 5,561 | 5,083 |
| Teymurlu RD (Note: Formerly Qazi Jahan Rural District) | 7,723 | 7,998 | 2,673 |
| Gugan (city) | 10,949 | 11,395 | 11,742 |
| Teymurlu (city) | | | 5,375 |
| Mamqan District (Note: Formerly the Central District) | 10,874 | 13,365 | 11,892 |
| Shahrak RD (Note: Formerly Khanamir Rural District) | (Note: Below reporting threshold) | | 0 |
| Mamqan (city) | 10,872 | 13,359 | 11,892 |
| Total | 99,286 | 107,579 | 110,311 |
RD = Rural District

== See also ==
Media related to Azarshahr County at Wikimedia Commons
