= Shellalu =

Shellalu شللو
- Village
- Location within Iran
- Coordinates: 37°55′45″N 45°55′22″E
- Country: Iran
- Province: East Azerbaijan
- County: Osku
- Bakhsh: Ilkhchi
- Rural District: Shurakat-e Jonubi

Population (2006)
  - Total: 200
- Time zone: UTC+3:30 (IRST)
  - Summer (DST): UTC+4:30 (IRDT)

Shellalu (Persian: شللو, also Romanized as Shellalū) is a village in Shurakat-e Jonubi Rural District, Ilkhchi District, Osku County, East Azerbaijan Province, Iran. At the 2006 census, its population was 200, in 59 families.
