= Iranchi =

Iranchi ايرنچي
- Village
- Country: Iran
- Province: East Azerbaijan
- County: Osku
- Bakhsh: Ilkhchi
- Rural District: Shurakat-e Jonubi

Population (2006)
  - Total: 7
- Time zone: UTC+3:30 (IRST)
  - Summer (DST): UTC+4:30 (IRDT)

Iranchi (Persian: ايرنچي, also Romanized as Īranchī) is a village in Shurakat-e Jonubi Rural District, Ilkhchi District, Osku County, East Azerbaijan Province, Iran. At the 2006 census, its population was 7, in 4 families.
