= Shahi Island =

Island in Iran

Coordinates: 37°51′00″N 45°30′00″E

Native name: شاهی آداسؽ
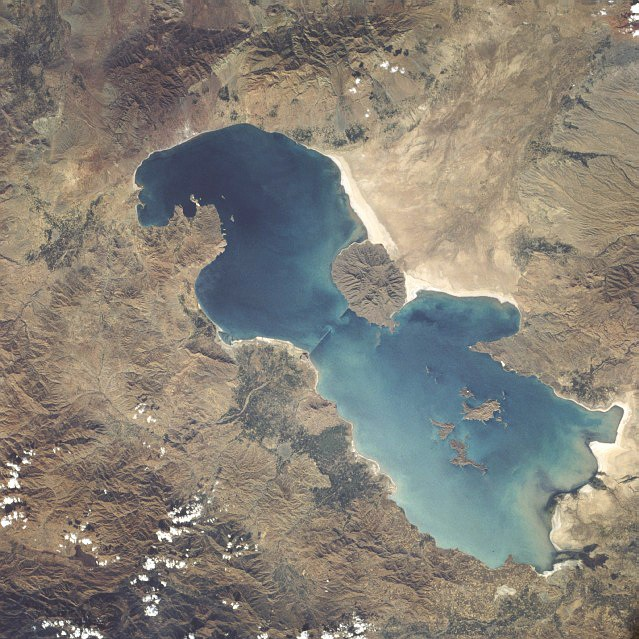
- Shahi Island is located in the eastern part of Urmia Lake
- Interactive map of Shahi Island

Geography
- Location: Persian Gulf
- Area: 230 km^{2} (89 sq mi)

Administration
- Iran
- Province: East Azerbaijan

Shahi Island (Persian: جزیرهٔ شاهی, Azerbaijani: شاهی آداسؽ, Armenian: Արքայից կղզի) lit. 'King Island' is the largest island in the endorheic Urmia Lake, East Azerbaijan Province in Iran. Located in the eastern part of the lake, Shahi Island has a surface area of 23,000 hectares.

The island is the only inhabited island in Lake Urmia, with seven villages, including Burachalu, Ghebchagh, Teymurlu, and Bahramabad. These villages were located on the shores of the island. However the water level in the lake has been falling, and the "island" is now connected to the mainland on its eastern side and it forms a peninsula. The Shahi island is a rural district (dehestan) in Osku County.

== History ==
In 1265, Hulagu Khan, the Mongol conqueror of Baghdad, was buried in a mountain (or castle) in the island, supposedly with all of his wealth. His tomb has not been found so far.

After the 1979 Iranian revolution and the overthrow of the Iranian monarchy, the revolutionaries changed the name of the island to Islami Island (Jazireh-ye-Eslami), which means Islamic Island.
