= Aliabad, Osku =

Aliabad علی‌آباد
- Village
- Location within Iran
- Coordinates: 37°55′31″N 45°52′49″E
- Country: Iran
- Province: East Azerbaijan
- County: Osku
- Bakhsh: Ilkhchi
- Rural District: Shurakat-e Jonubi

Population (2006)
  - Total: 235
- Time zone: UTC+3:30 (IRST)
  - Summer (DST): UTC+4:30 (IRDT)

Aliabad (Persian: علی‌آباد, also Romanized as ‘Alīābād) is a village in Shurakat-e Jonubi Rural District, Ilkhchi District, Osku County, East Azerbaijan Province, Iran. At then 2006 census, its population was 235, in 63 families.
