= Hasanabad, Osku =

Hasanabad حسن اباد
- Village
- Location within Iran
- Coordinates: 37°55′07″N 45°50′03″E
- Country: Iran
- Province: East Azerbaijan
- County: Osku
- Bakhsh: Ilkhchi
- Rural District: Shurakat-e Jonubi

Population (2006)
  - Total: 105
- Time zone: UTC+3:30 (IRST)
  - Summer (DST): UTC+4:30 (IRDT)

Hasanabad (Persian: حسن اباد, also Romanized as Ḩasanābād) is a village in Shurakat-e Jonubi Rural District, Ilkhchi District, Osku County, East Azerbaijan Province, Iran. At the 2006 census, its population was 105, in 29 families.
