= Hilehvar historical village =

Iranian national heritage site

Hilehvar Persian: حیله ور
- Village
- mountain architecture in the village of HilehVar

- Location within Iran
- Coordinates: 37°48′36.86″N 46°13′46.358″E
- Country: Iran
- Province: East Azerbaijan
- County: Osku

Population
  - Total: 0
- Time zone: UTC+3:30 (IRST)

Hilehvar historical village is a historical underground village in Osku County, East Azerbaijan province, Iran, near the city of Osku and village of Kandovan. The village is currently abandoned. The village is believed to date to the Medes period and reportedly its local citizens fled to the nearby village of Kandovan following the Mongol invasion.

Located on the slopes of Mount Sahand and in the heart of the hilly terrain, the village is known for its distinctive underground architecture and due to its uniqueness, it is also referred to as the “Underground Village”.

== Naming ==
Hilehvar consists of structures carved into the heart of the earth, taking the form of beautiful, hand-hewn huts. At first glance these structures are difficult to spot. The village concealed structure may have been intended to protect its citizens from enemies and outsiders, giving the village its name, marking one of the reasons for its fame.

The name Hilehvar is interpreted as "village of concealment", or "village of deception", possibly due to its architectural concealment advantages.

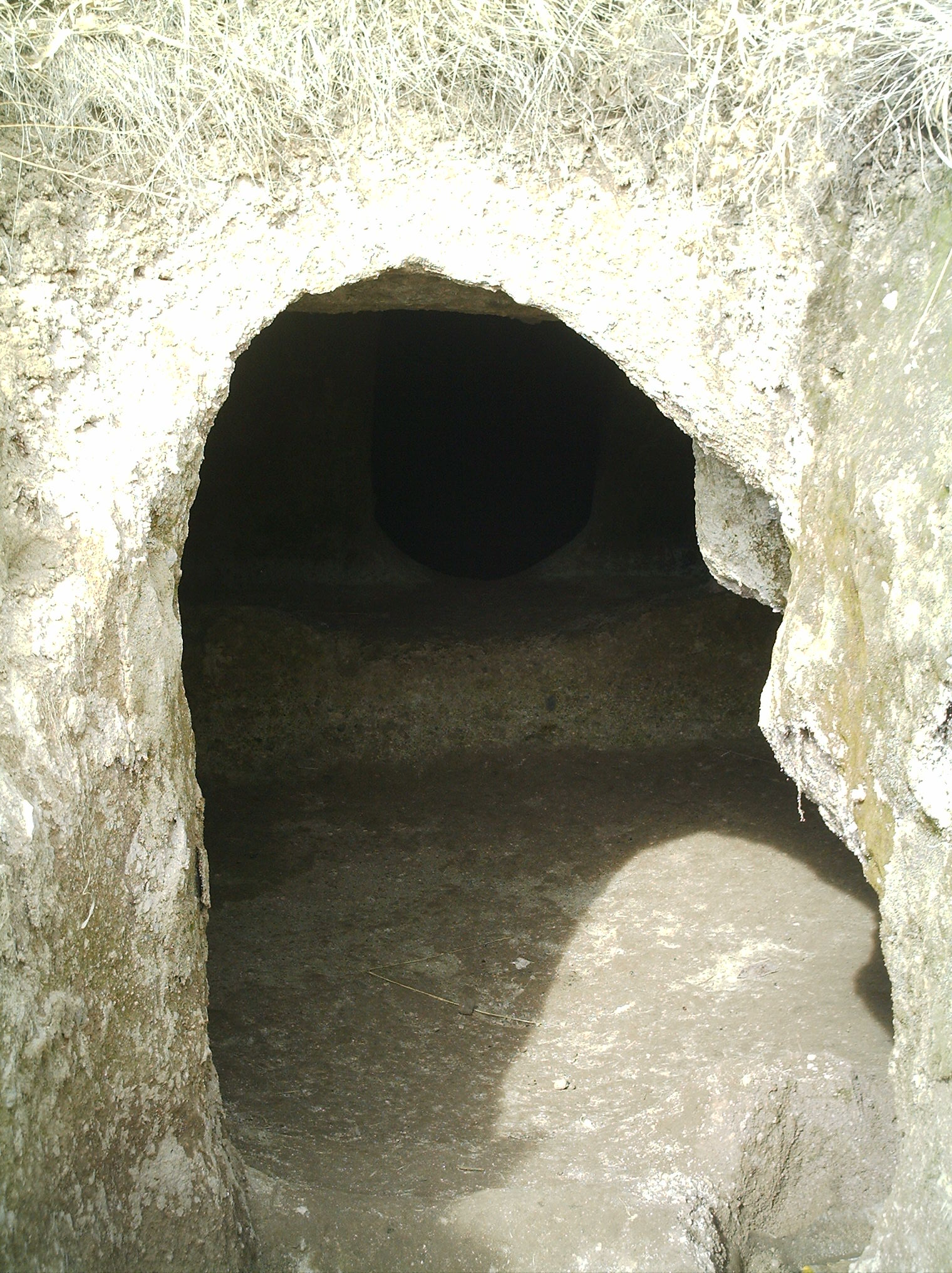
One of the historical houses

== Architecture ==
The village is on the lower part of mountain range. Drainage pits were constructed to redirect the rainwater away from the village during heavy rainfall seasons.
