= Gamichi =

Village in East Azerbaijan province, Iran

Gamichi Persian: گمیچی
- Village
- Location within Iran
- Coordinates: 37°45′49″N 45°30′31″E
- Country: Iran
- Province: East Azerbaijan
- County: Osku
- District: Ilkhchi
- Rural District: Jazireh

Population (2016)
  - Total: 409
- Time zone: UTC+3:30 (IRST)

Gamichi (Persian: گمیچی) (Note: Also romanized as Gamīchī) is a village in Jazireh Rural District of Ilkhchi District in Osku County, East Azerbaijan province, Iran. Gamichi is a Turkic word and in Azerbaijani means "sailor."

== Demographics ==
=== Population ===
At the time of the 2006 National Census, the village's population was 527 in 184 households. The following census in 2011 counted 453 people in 197 households. The 2016 census measured the population of the village as 409 people in 174 households.
