= Qepchaq =

Qepchaq or Qopchaq (Persian: قپچاق) may refer to:

- Qepchaq, Bostanabad, East Azerbaijan Province
- Qepchaq, Osku, East Azerbaijan Province
- Qepchaq, Hamadan
- Qepchaq, West Azerbaijan

== See also ==
- Qebchaq (disambiguation)
