= Khasehlar =

Village in East Azerbaijan province, Iran

Khasehlar Persian: خاصه لر
- Village
- Location within Iran
- Coordinates: 37°55′39″N 46°00′23″E
- Country: Iran
- Province: East Azerbaijan
- County: Osku
- District: Ilkhchi
- Rural District: Shurakat-e Jonubi

Population (2016)
  - Total: 1,082
- Time zone: UTC+3:30 (IRST)

Khasehlar (Persian: خاصه لر) (Note: Also romanized as Khāşehlar; also known as Khaşīl (خصيل)) is a village in Shurakat-e Jonubi Rural District of Ilkhchi District in Osku County, East Azerbaijan province, Iran.

== Demographics ==
=== Population ===
At the time of the 2006 National Census, the village's population was 957 in 238 households. The following census in 2011 counted 1,060 people in 293 households. The 2016 census measured the population of the village as 1,082 people in 340 households.
