= Beyglu =

Village in East Azerbaijan province, Iran

Beyglu Persian: بيگلو
- Village
- Location within Iran
- Coordinates: 37°54′55″N 45°58′36″E
- Country: Iran
- Province: East Azerbaijan
- County: Osku
- District: Ilkhchi
- Rural District: Shurakat-e Jonubi

Population (2016)
  - Total: 512
- Time zone: UTC+3:30 (IRST)

Beyglu (Persian: بيگلو) (Note: Also romanized as Bayglū and Beyglū; also known as Baygehlū) is a village in Shurakat-e Jonubi Rural District of Ilkhchi District in Osku County, East Azerbaijan province, Iran.

== Demographics ==
=== Population ===
At the time of the 2006 National Census, the village's population was 394 in 123 households. The following census in 2011 counted 529 people in 152 households. The 2016 census measured the population of the village as 512 people in 156 households.
