= Teymurlu, Osku =

Teymurlu تيمورلو
- Village
- Location within Iran
- Coordinates: 37°55′24″N 45°28′38″E
- Country: Iran
- Province: East Azerbaijan
- County: Osku
- Bakhsh: Ilkhchi
- Rural District: Jazireh

Population (2006)
  - Total: 142
- Time zone: UTC+3:30 (IRST)
  - Summer (DST): UTC+4:30 (IRDT)

Teymurlu (Persian: تيمورلو, also Romanized as Teymūrlū) is an Iranian village on Shahi Island. It is located in Jazireh Rural District, Ilkhchi District, Osku County, East Azerbaijan Province, Iran. At the 2006 census, its population was 142, in 41 families.
