= Burachalu =

Burachalu بوراچالو
- Village
- Location within Iran
- Coordinates: 37°55′09″N 45°27′37″E
- Country: Iran
- Province: East Azerbaijan
- County: Osku
- Bakhsh: Ilkhchi
- Rural District: Jazireh

Population (2006)
  - Total: 159
- Time zone: UTC+3:30 (IRST)
  - Summer (DST): UTC+4:30 (IRDT)

Burachalu (Persian: بوراچالو, also Romanized as Būrāchālū; also known as Būrā Chāllū and Būrā Chālū) is an Iranian village on Shahi Island. It is located in Jazireh Rural District, Ilkhchi District, Osku County, East Azerbaijan Province, Iran. At the 2006 census, its population was 159, in 47 families.
