= Mehdinlu =

Village in East Azerbaijan province, Iran

Mehdinlu Persian: مهدينلو
- Village
- Location within Iran
- Coordinates: 37°58′32″N 45°53′38″E
- Country: Iran
- Province: East Azerbaijan
- County: Osku
- District: Ilkhchi
- Rural District: Shurakat-e Jonubi

Population (2016)
  - Total: 937
- Time zone: UTC+3:30 (IRST)

Mehdinlu (Persian: مهدينلو) (Note: Also romanized as Mahdīnlū and Mehdīnlū; also known as Mehdīlū) is a village in Shurakat-e Jonubi Rural District of Ilkhchi District in Osku County, East Azerbaijan province, Iran.

== Demographics ==
=== Population ===
At the time of the 2006 National Census, the village's population was 741 in 185 households. The following census in 2011 counted 897 people in 233 households. The 2016 census measured the population of the village as 937 people in 269 households.
