= Aq Gonbad =

Village in East Azerbaijan province, Iran

Aq Gonbad Persian: اق گنبد
- Village
- Location within Iran
- Coordinates: 37°48′59″N 45°25′23″E
- Country: Iran
- Province: East Azerbaijan
- County: Osku
- District: Ilkhchi
- Rural District: Jazireh

Population (2016)
  - Total: 550
- Time zone: UTC+3:30 (IRST)

Aq Gonbad (Persian: اق گنبد) (Note: Also romanized as Āq Gonbad and Āqgonbad; also known as Agh Gonbad (اغ گنبد), Bandar Aq Gunbad, Bandar Safīd Gunbad, Bandar Sefid Gunbad, Bandar-e Āgh Gonbad, Bandar-e Āq Gonbad, Bandar-e Sefīd Gonbad,Gumbad, Sefīd Gonbad, and Sefid Gunbad) is a village in Jazireh Rural District of Ilkhchi District in Osku County, East Azerbaijan province, Iran.

== Demographics ==
=== Population ===
At the time of the 2006 National Census, the village's population was 898 in 267 households. The following census in 2011 counted 759 people in 263 households. The 2016 census measured the population of the village as 550 people in 230 households.
