= Sarin Dizaj =

Village in East Azerbaijan province, Iran

Sarin Dizaj Persian: سرين ديزج
- Village
- Location within Iran
- Coordinates: 37°54′27″N 45°53′36″E
- Country: Iran
- Province: East Azerbaijan
- County: Osku
- District: Ilkhchi
- Rural District: Shurakat-e Jonubi

Population (2016)
  - Total: 1,002
- Time zone: UTC+3:30 (IRST)

Sarin Dizaj (Persian: سرين ديزج) (Note: Also romanized as Sarīn Dīzaj) is a village in Shurakat-e Jonubi Rural District of Ilkhchi District in Osku County, East Azerbaijan province, Iran.

== Demographics ==
=== Population ===
At the time of the 2006 National Census, the village's population was 872 in 213 households. The following census in 2011 counted 1,048 people in 290 households. The 2016 census measured the population of the village as 1,002 people in 290 households.
