= Saray Deh =

Village in East Azerbaijan province, Iran

Saray Deh Persian: سرای‌ده
- Village
- Location within Iran
- Coordinates: 37°51′44″N 45°33′49″E
- Country: Iran
- Province: East Azerbaijan
- County: Osku
- District: Ilkhchi
- Rural District: Jazireh

Population (2016)
  - Total: 927
- Time zone: UTC+3:30 (IRST)

Saray Deh (Persian: سرای‌ده) (Note: Also romanized as Sarāy Deh; also known as Saray and Sarāy) is a village in, and the capital of, Jazireh Rural District in Ilkhchi District of Osku County, East Azerbaijan province, Iran.

== Demographics ==
=== Population ===
At the time of the 2006 National Census, the village's population was 1,153 in 318 households. The following census in 2011 counted 1,079 people in 350 households. The 2016 census measured the population of the village as 927 people in 332 households. It was the most populous village in its rural district.
