= Khvor Khvor =

Village in East Azerbaijan province, Iran

Khvor Khvor Persian: خورخور
- Village
- Location within Iran
- Coordinates: 37°51′55″N 45°46′59″E
- Country: Iran
- Province: East Azerbaijan
- County: Osku
- District: Ilkhchi
- Rural District: Shurakat-e Jonubi

Population (2016)
  - Total: 907
- Time zone: UTC+3:30 (IRST)

Khvor Khvor (Persian: خورخور) (Note: Also romanized as Khowr Khowr and Khūr Khūr; also known as Khor Khor and Khorkhora) is a village in Shurakat-e Jonubi Rural District of Ilkhchi District in Osku County, East Azerbaijan province, Iran.

== Demographics ==
=== Population ===
At the time of the 2006 National Census, the village's population was 790 in 191 households. The following census in 2011 counted 910 people in 242 households. The 2016 census measured the population of the village as 907 people in 262 households.
