= Kordlar, Osku =

Village in East Azerbaijan province, Iran

Kordlar Persian: كردلر
- Village
- Location within Iran
- Coordinates: 37°57′29″N 45°59′21″E
- Country: Iran
- Province: East Azerbaijan
- County: Osku
- District: Ilkhchi
- Rural District: Shurakat-e Jonubi

Population (2016)
  - Total: 2,818
- Time zone: UTC+3:30 (IRST)

Kordlar (Persian: كردلر) is a village in Shurakat-e Jonubi Rural District of Ilkhchi District in Osku County, East Azerbaijan province, Iran.

== Demographics ==
=== Population ===
At the time of the 2006 National Census, the village's population was 2,654 in 678 households. The following census in 2011 counted 2,845 people in 843 households. The 2016 census measured the population of the village as 2,818 people in 944 households. It was the most populous village in its rural district.
