= Zeyn ol Hajjilu =

Village in East Azerbaijan province, Iran

Zeyn ol Hajjilu Persian: زين الحاجيلو
- Village
- Location within Iran
- Coordinates: 37°57′56″N 45°55′49″E
- Country: Iran
- Province: East Azerbaijan
- County: Osku
- District: Ilkhchi
- Rural District: Shurakat-e Jonubi

Population (2016)
  - Total: 1,808
- Time zone: UTC+3:30 (IRST)

Zeyn ol Hajjilu (Persian: زين الحاجيلو) (Note: Also romanized as Zeyn ol Ḩājjīlū and Zīn al Ḩājjīlū'; also known as Zeynāl Āghāj (زينال اغاج)) is a village in Shurakat-e Jonubi Rural District of Ilkhchi District in Osku County, East Azerbaijan province, Iran.

== Demographics ==
=== Population ===
At the time of the 2006 National Census, the village's population was 1,443 in 357 households. The following census in 2011 counted 1,688 people in 498 households. The 2016 census measured the population of the village as 1,808 people in 546 households.
