= Khasabad =

Village in East Azerbaijan province, Iran

Khasabad Persian: خاص اباد
- Village
- Location within Iran
- Coordinates: 37°54′19″N 45°56′12″E
- Country: Iran
- Province: East Azerbaijan
- County: Osku
- District: Ilkhchi
- Rural District: Shurakat-e Jonubi

Population (2016)
  - Total: 1,370
- Time zone: UTC+3:30 (IRST)

Khasabad (Persian: خاص اباد) (Note: Also romanized as Khāşābād; also known as Khāşebān (خاصبان)) is a village in, and the capital of, Shurakat-e Jonubi Rural District in Ilkhchi District of Osku County, East Azerbaijan province, Iran.

== Demographics ==
=== Population ===
At the time of the 2006 National Census, the village's population was 1,252 in 344 households. The following census in 2011 counted 1,376 people in 389 households. The 2016 census measured the population of the village as 1,370 people in 427 households.
