= Hulegu Khan Castle =

Castle in East Azerbaijan Province, Iran

- قلعه هولاکوخان
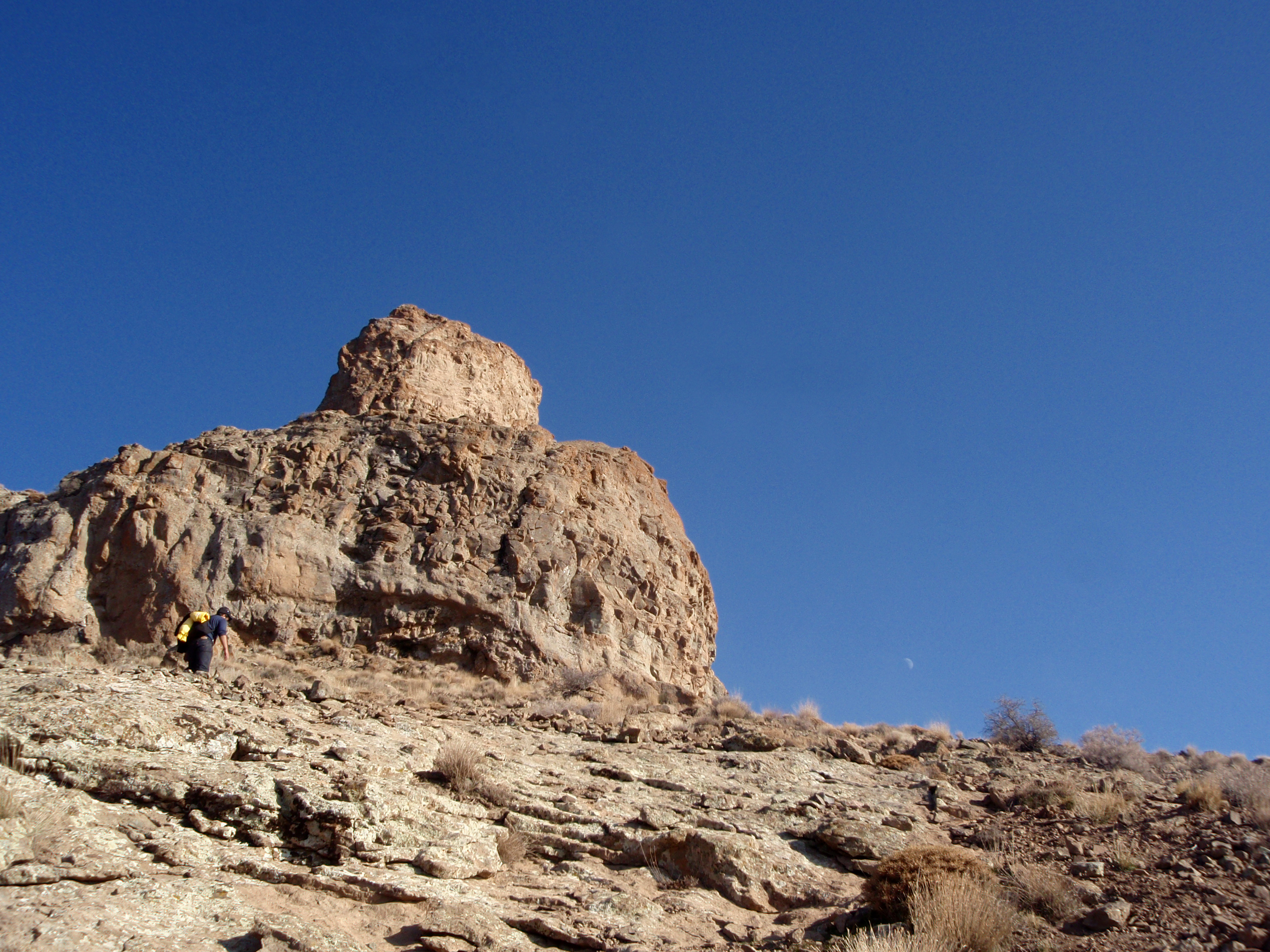

General information
- Type: Castle
- Location: Osku County, Iran

Hulegu Khan Castle (Persian: قلعه هولاکوخان) is a historical castle located in Osku County in East Azerbaijan Province, The longevity of this fortress dates back to the Sasanian Empire.
