= Qebchaq =

Qebchaq or Qebchak (Persian: قبچاق) may refer to:

- Qebchaq, Alborz
- Qebchaq, East Azerbaijan
- Qebchaq, Tehran

== See also ==
- Qepchaq (disambiguation)
