= Sahand, Iran =

City in East Azerbaijan province, Iran

Sahand Persian: سهند
- City
- Location within Iran
- Coordinates: 37°56′42″N 46°06′49″E
- Country: Iran
- Province: East Azerbaijan
- County: Osku
- District: Central
- Established as a city: 2008

Population (2016)
  - Total: 82,494
- Time zone: UTC+3:30 (IRST)

Sahand (Persian: سهند) is a satellite city in the Central District of Osku County, East Azerbaijan province, Iran. It is designed to accommodate the overflow of the Tabriz metropolitan area's increasing population. The main campus of Sahand University of Technology is located in the southeastern part of the city.

== Demographics ==
=== Population ===
At the time of the 2006 National Census, Sahand's population was 13,610 in 3,922 households, when it was the village of Shahrak-e Sahand in Bavil Rural District. The following census in 2011 counted 24,704 people in 7,342 households, by which time the village had been converted to the city of Sahand. The 2016 census measured the population of the city as 82,494 people in 25,802 households.

== Climate ==
Climate data for Sahand (normals 1996-2005) elevation: 1641.0 m
Month	Jan	Feb	Mar	Apr	May	Jun	Jul	Aug	Sep	Oct	Nov	Dec	Year
Daily mean °C (°F)	−1.1 (30.0)	0.5 (32.9)	5.3 (41.5)	10.9 (51.6)	16.0 (60.8)	21.5 (70.7)	24.7 (76.5)	25.5 (77.9)	20.7 (69.3)	14.9 (58.8)	6.8 (44.2)	1.8 (35.2)	12.3 (54.1)
Average precipitation mm (inches)	17.1 (0.67)	11.9 (0.47)	22.3 (0.88)	49.2 (1.94)	34.3 (1.35)	5.8 (0.23)	8.1 (0.32)	1.3 (0.05)	2.5 (0.10)	12.6 (0.50)	20.5 (0.81)	17.1 (0.67)	202.7 (7.99)
Average dew point °C (°F)	−6.0 (21.2)	−6.7 (19.9)	−4.7 (23.5)	−0.7 (30.7)	3.0 (37.4)	3.9 (39.0)	6.9 (44.4)	5.7 (42.3)	2.4 (36.3)	0.6 (33.1)	−2.0 (28.4)	−4.3 (24.3)	−0.2 (31.7)
Source: IRIMO(Temperature), (Dew point), (Precipitation)
