= Ilkhchi =

City in East Azerbaijan province, Iran

Ilkhchi Persian: ایلخچی
- City
- Location within Iran
- Coordinates: 37°56′09″N 45°58′46″E
- Country: Iran
- Province: East Azerbaijan
- County: Osku
- District: Ilkhchi

Population (2016)
  - Total: 16,574
- Time zone: UTC+3:30 (IRST)

Ilkhchi (Persian: ایلخچی) (Note: Also romanized as Īlkhchī; Azerbaijani: Ilxıçı) is a city in, and the capital of, Ilkhchi District in Osku County, East Azerbaijan province, Iran. Ilkhchi is located to the south east of Tabriz, the capital city of the province.

== Demographics ==
=== Population ===
At the time of the 2006 National Census, the city's population was 13,927 in 4,014 households. The following census in 2011 counted 15,231 people in 4,735 households. The 2016 census measured the population of the city as 16,574 people in 5,500 households.
