= Qepchaq, Osku =

Village in East Azerbaijan province, Iran

Qepchaq Persian: قپچاق
- Village
- Location within Iran
- Coordinates: 37°55′21″N 45°30′40″E
- Country: Iran
- Province: East Azerbaijan
- County: Osku
- District: Ilkhchi
- Rural District: Jazireh

Population (2016)
  - Total: 335
- Time zone: UTC+3:30 (IRST)

Qepchaq (Persian: قپچاق) (Note: Also romanized as Qepchāq and Qopchāq; also known as Kipchak, Qebchāq, Qebjāq, Qeychāq, and Qobjāq) is a village in Jazireh Rural District of Ilkhchi District in Osku County, East Azerbaijan province, Iran.

== Demographics ==
=== Population ===
At the time of the 2006 National Census, the village's population was 620 in 169 households. The following census in 2011 counted 429 people in 148 households. The 2016 census measured the population of the village as 335 people in 129 households.
