= Qepchaq, Bostanabad =

Qepchaq قپچاق
- Village
- Location within Iran
- Coordinates: 37°40′07″N 47°01′47″E
- Country: Iran
- Province: East Azerbaijan
- County: Bostanabad
- Bakhsh: Tekmeh Dash
- Rural District: Abbas-e Gharbi

Population (2006)
  - Total: 193
- Time zone: UTC+3:30 (IRST)
  - Summer (DST): UTC+4:30 (IRDT)

Qepchaq (Persian: قپچاق, also Romanized as Qepchāq; also known as Qīchāq and Qīpchāq) is a village in Abbas-e Gharbi Rural District, Tekmeh Dash District, Bostanabad County, East Azerbaijan Province, Iran. At the 2006 census, its population was 193, in 37 families.
