= Osku =

City in East Azerbaijan province, Iran

Osku Persian: اسكو
- City
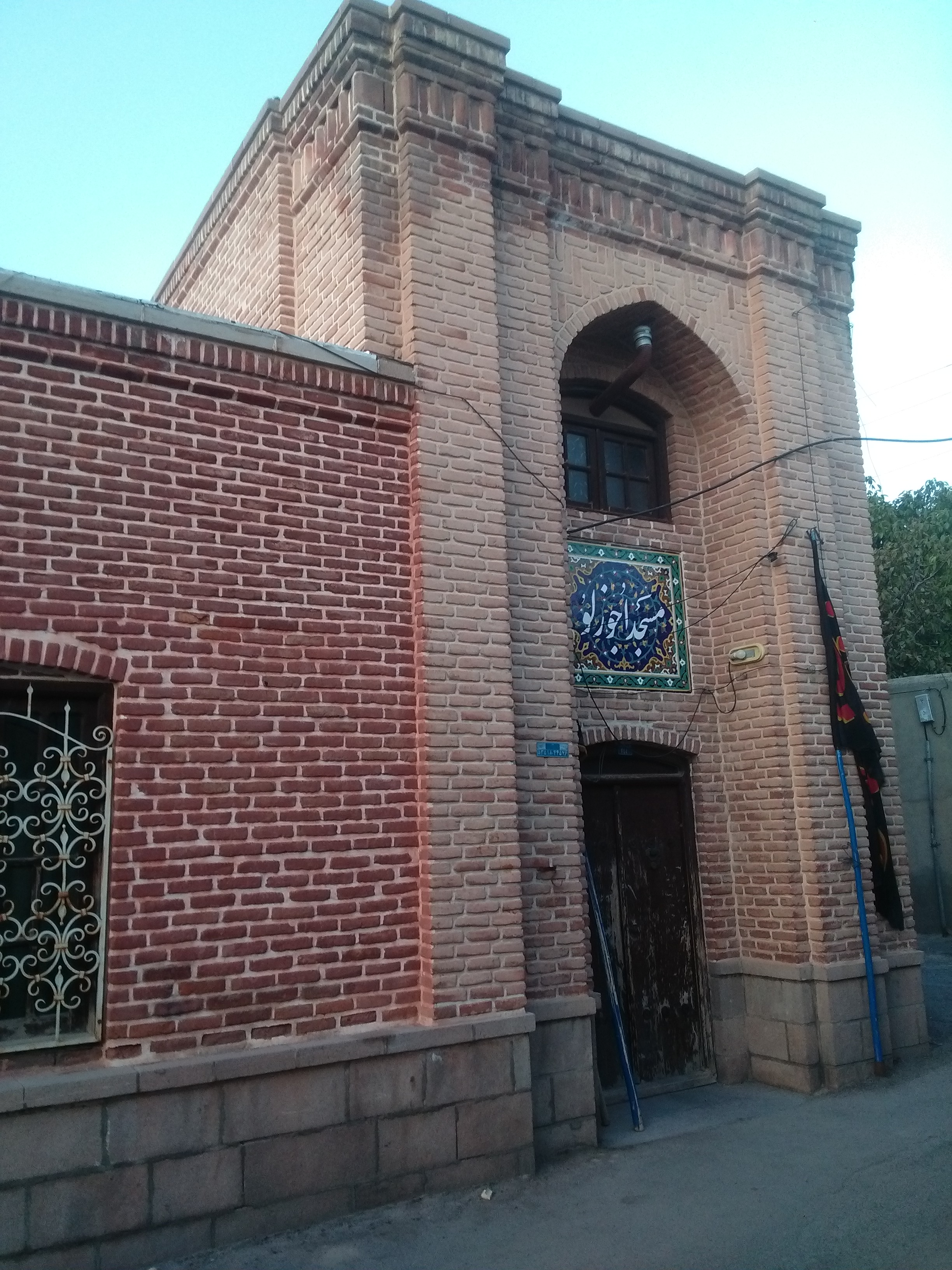
- Mosque in Osku

- Location within Iran
- Coordinates: 37°54′58″N 46°07′28″E
- Country: Iran
- Province: East Azerbaijan
- County: Osku
- District: Central

Population (2016)
  - Total: 18,459
- Time zone: UTC+3:30 (IRST)

Osku (Persian: اسكو) (Note: Also romanized as Oskū; also known as Uzku and Yuzki; and Üçqaya (Azerbaijani: اوشقایا)) is a city in the Central District of Osku County, East Azerbaijan province, Iran, serving as capital of both the county and the district.

== Demographics ==
=== Population ===
At the time of the 2006 National Census, the city's population was 16,140 in 4,928 households. The following census in 2011 counted 16,983 people in 5,553 households. The 2016 census measured the population of the city as 18,459 people in 6,311 households.

== Overview ==
Osku is one of the oldest cities in East Azerbaijan and is obtained according to old books and is a like stepping into a time machine. The city is located on a hillside volcano and has many caves in the city. The inhabitants of Osku are Azerbaijan Turks, who have lived in the city for more than 100 years. The touristic attractions such Kandovan, Osku and natural landscapes etc. make it pleasant enough for Tourism making Osku one of the touristic cities in Iran.Kandovan, Osku Touristy village is one of its subdivisions. Hilleh Historical Village is another historical village near to the city which is currently abandoned.

Osku is one of the few cities in Iran where Batik printing centers still remain in operation. Now, Osku is known as the capital of Batik in Iran. Batik dyeing industry is traditional coloring on textile fabrics especially silk and Osku a city in northwestern Iran is the capital of Batik coloring in Iran. Batik, a technique of wax-resist dyeing, is used in crafting totally handmade shawls in the northwestern Iranian city of Osku, East Azerbaijan province, Iran. In Osku, Batik prints is called "Kalagheh’i". The only region of Iran where Batik prints are practiced is Osku, East Azerbaijan province, Iran. Weaving silk fabrics have been popular in East Azerbaijan province from a long time ago. The exact history of Batik prints in Iran is still unknown. But some specialists believe that since Azerbaijan is located in the path of Silk Road, this print has entered Iran from China.

In Osku, East Azerbaijan province, Iran, there is a kind of silk fabric known as "Kalagheh’i" scarves which is dyed using the special method of Batik. As the most important art industry in Osku, Batik was incorporated in Iran's spiritual heritage to the national record in 2010, Batik products in Osku city, are currently exported to Germany, the United States, Azerbaijan, Turkey, and Turkmenistan etc.
