= Kandovan, Osku =

Village in East Azerbaijan province, Iran

Kandovan Persian: كندوان
- Village
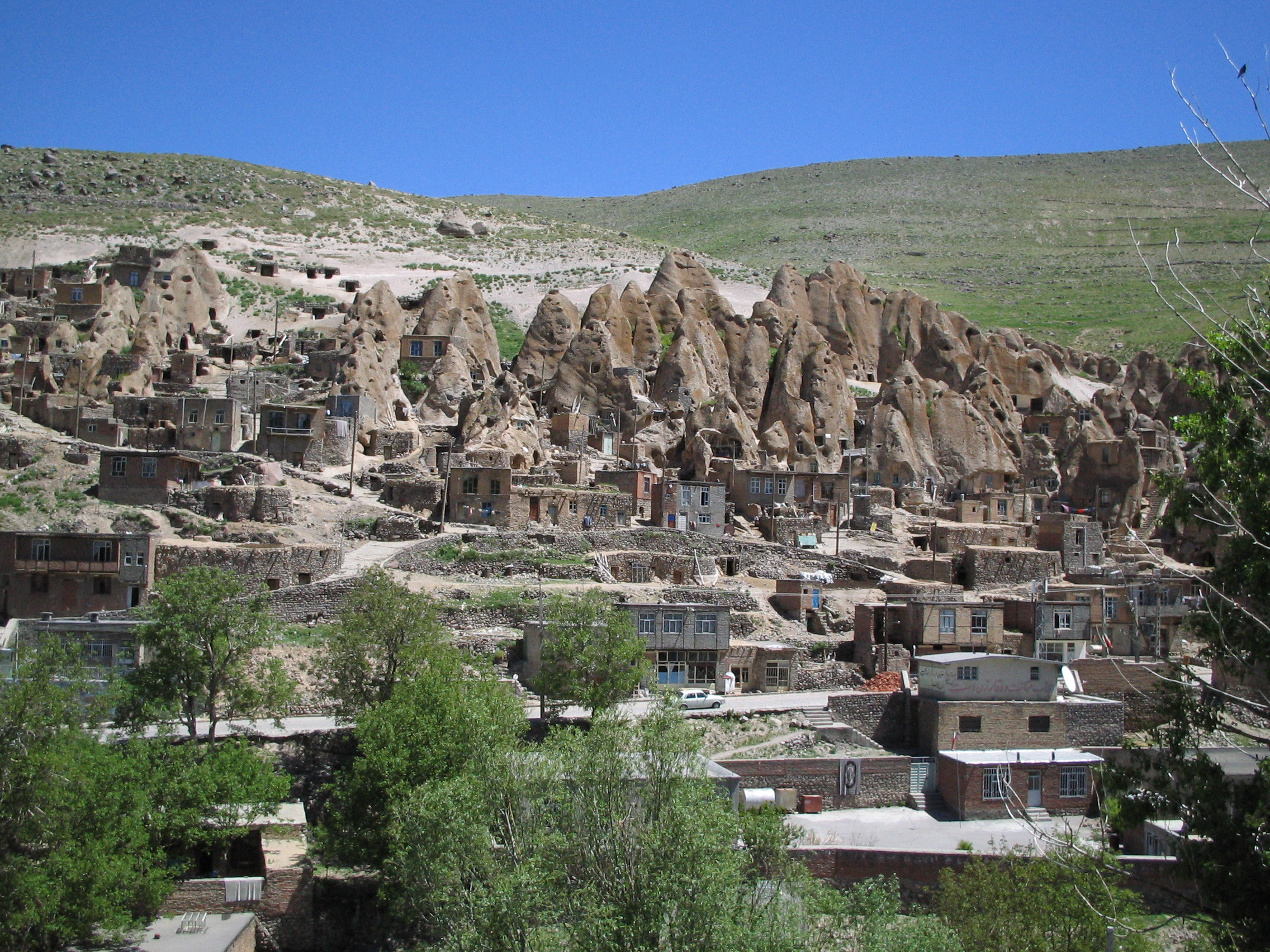
- Rock houses in the village of Kandovan

- Location within Iran
- Coordinates: 37°47′43″N 46°14′53″E
- Country: Iran
- Province: East Azerbaijan
- County: Osku
- District: Central
- Rural District: Sahand

Population (2016)
  - Total: 450
- Time zone: UTC+3:30 (IRST)

Kandovan (Persian: كندوان) (Note: Also romanized as Kandavān and Kandovān; also known as Kanvān) is a village in Sahand Rural District of the Central District in Osku County, East Azerbaijan province, Iran. It is situated in the foothills of Mount Sahand, near the city of Osku.

The village exemplifies manmade cliff dwellings which are still inhabited. The troglodyte homes, excavated inside volcanic rocks similar to dwellings in the Turkish region of Cappadocia, are locally called karaan. Karaans were cut into non-welded ignimbrites, also called "ash-flow tuffs," of Mount Sahand. The cone form of the houses is the result of the erosion of ignimbrite layers consisting of porous, round and angular pumice together with other volcanic particles that were positioned in a grey, acidic matrix. During the eruption of Sahand, pyroclastic flows formed the rocks of Kandovan. Around the village the thickness of this formation exceeds 100 metres (330 ft) and with time, due to water erosion, the cone-shaped cliffs were formed. Various grooves that were actually natural water passages have separated the cone-cliffs from each other and form the current streets of the village. Over some of these streets, bridges have been built that connect two karaans to each other. The karaans are developed in east–west direction and are mostly concentrated on the eastern side, whilst most entries and living units have a southward direction. Some karaans are as high as 30 to 40 m.

== Origin and stages of development ==
Mount Sahand is one of the most important mountains, the Silent volcano in Iran for one hundred and forty thousand years ago. After the retreat of Kandovan Lake basin, the stone of Kandovan has appeared.

There are several narrations about the establishment of the village:

- The original inhabitants were nomads who had previously been Condon this place was used as a summer house and houses dug inside the cliffs, which they used temporarily. In order to reduce the hassle of moving, they later permanently settled there.
- Primary residents of Kandovan village, residents of the ruined and ancient village, was "Hilevar". Those times Mongol attack from this village, which is about two kilometers from Kandovan, they had moved and lived in Kandovan.
- In ancient times, some of the warriors from this place passed, due to the better military position of the place, Especially its topographic position that penetrates from above makes the domain impossible, use it as its own refuge they chose and started digging houses inside the rocks.

== Demographics ==
=== Population ===
At the time of the 2006 National Census, the village's population was 601 in 168 households. The following census in 2011 counted 586 people in 183 households. The 2016 census measured the population of the village as 450 people in 151 households.

== Gallery ==
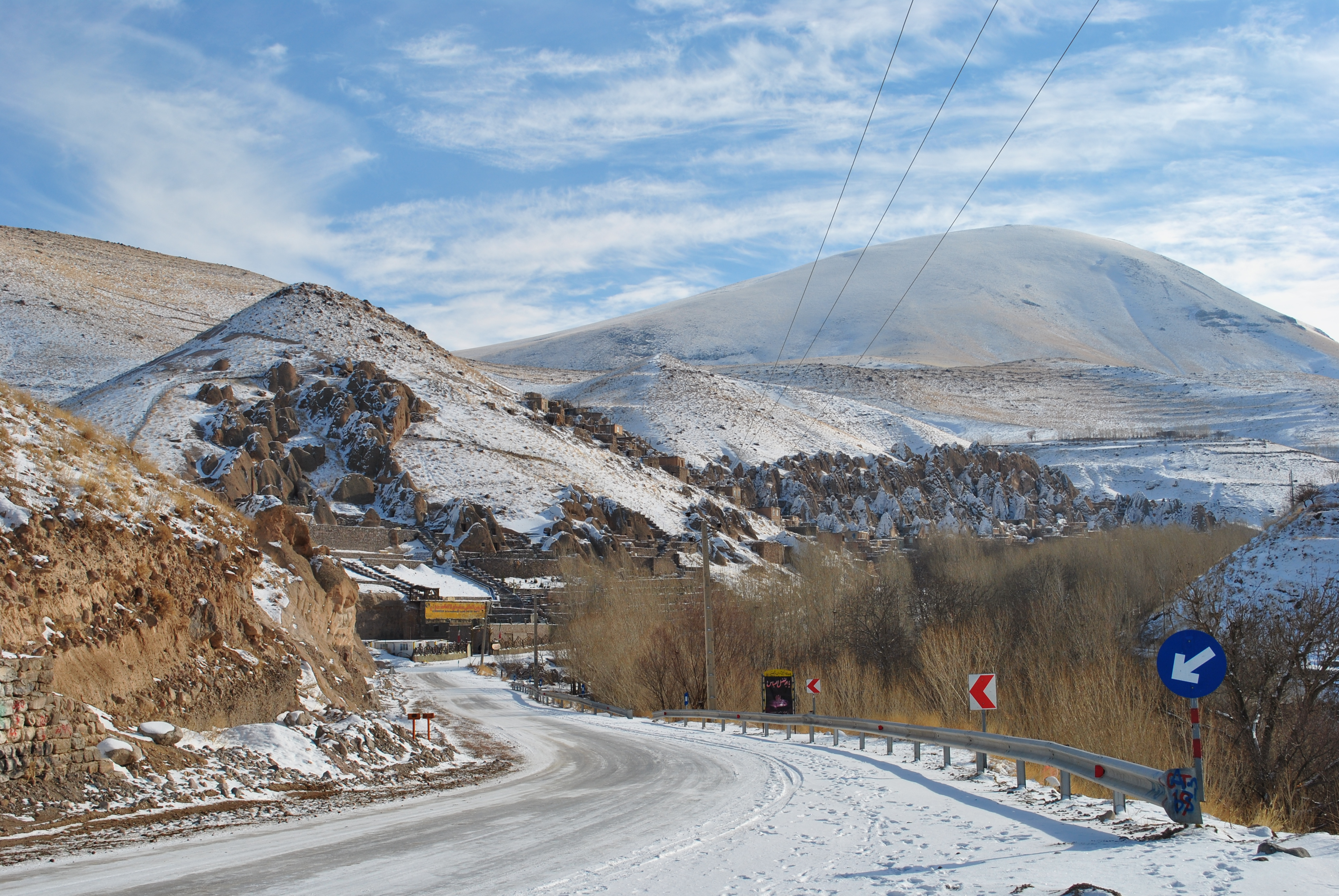
Far view of a hotel on the left and the rock houses on the right

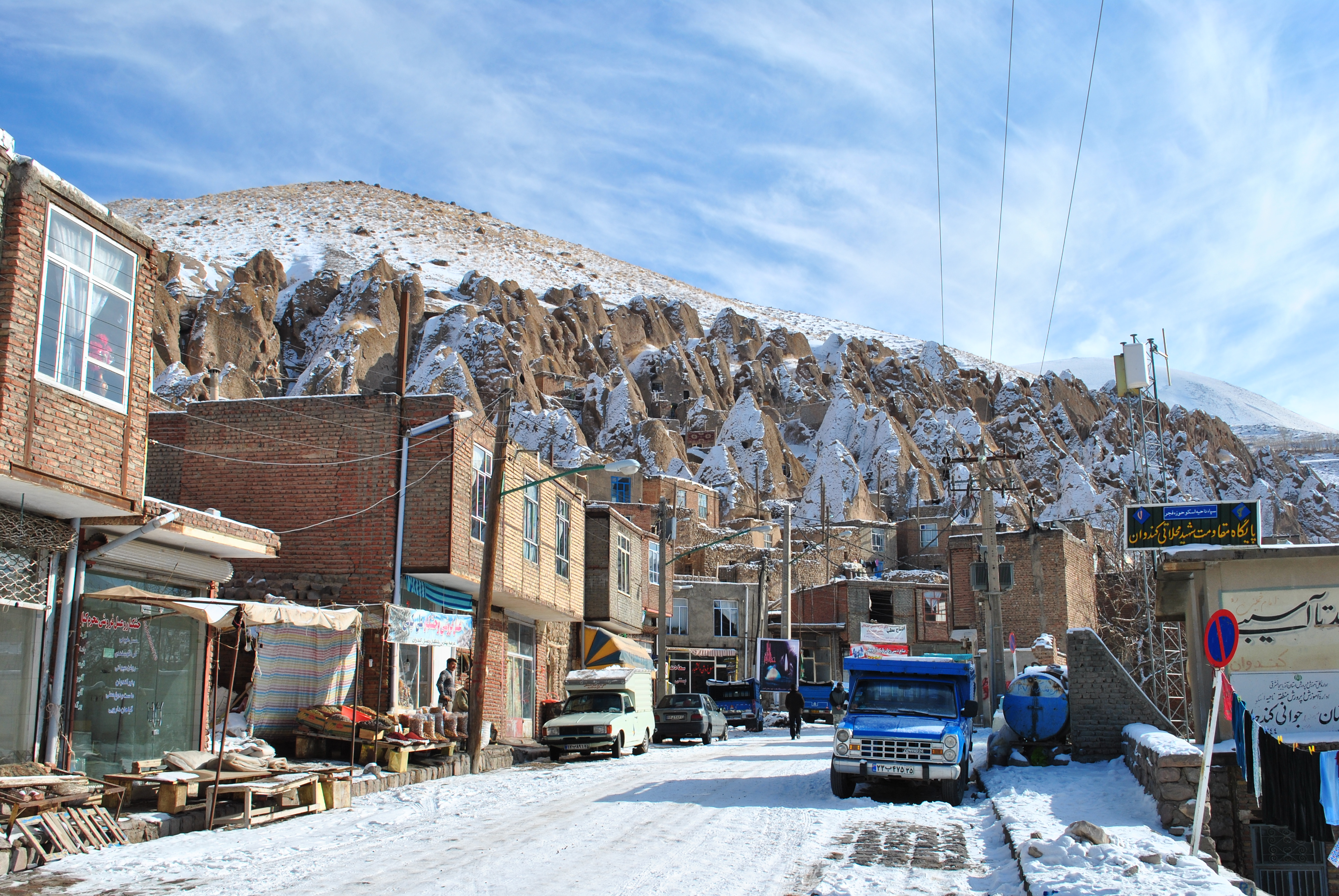
Closer view of the village

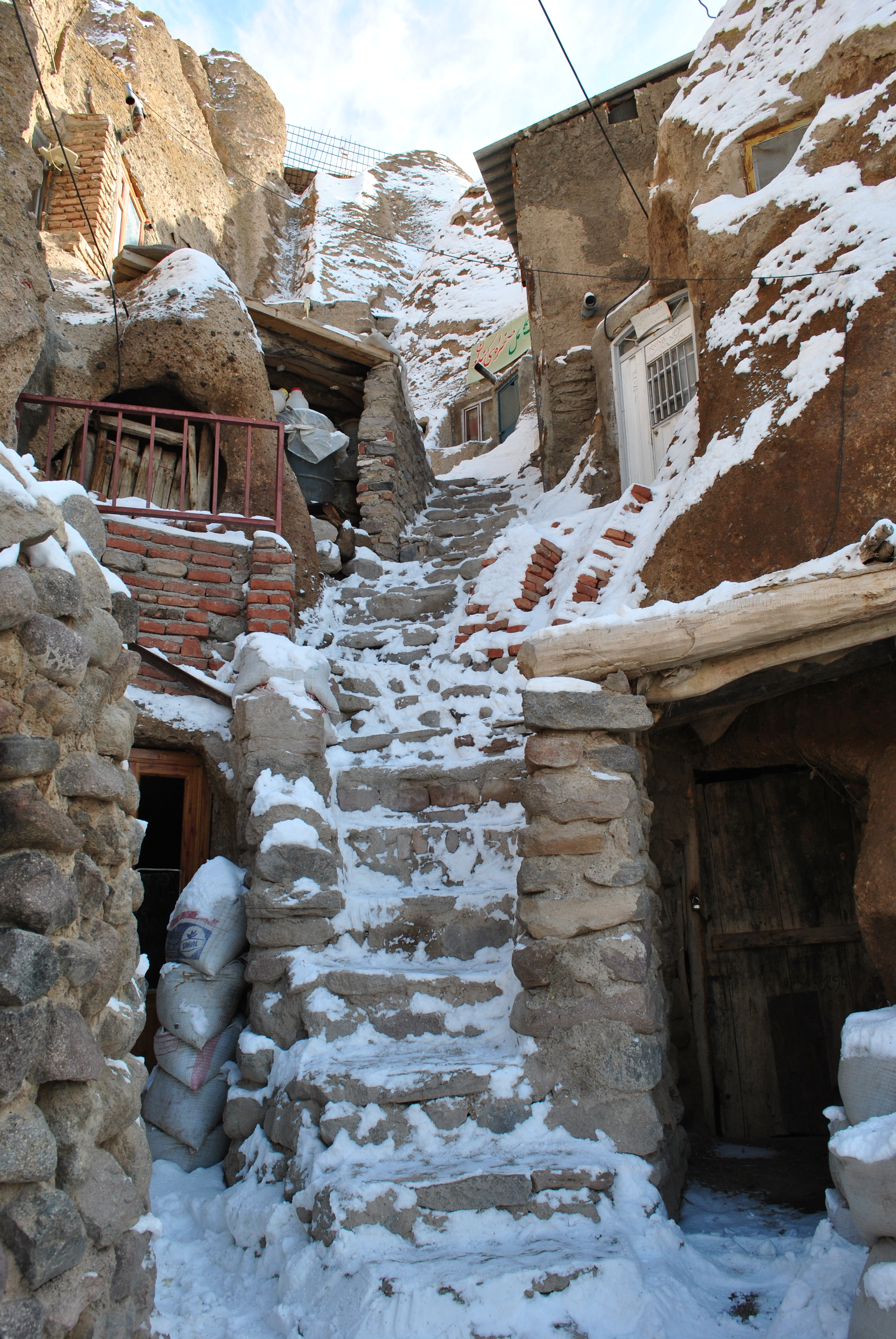
In the village

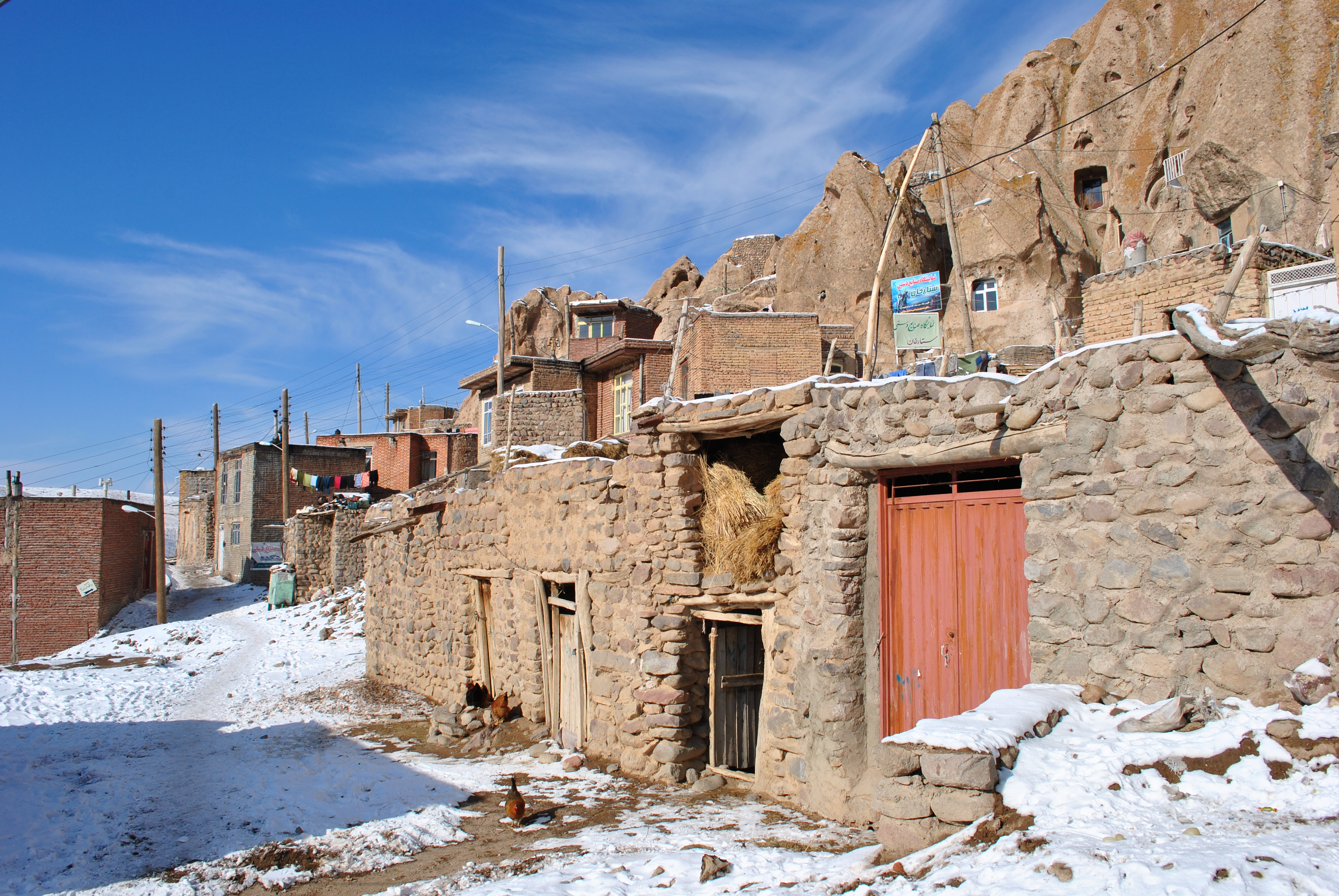
In the village

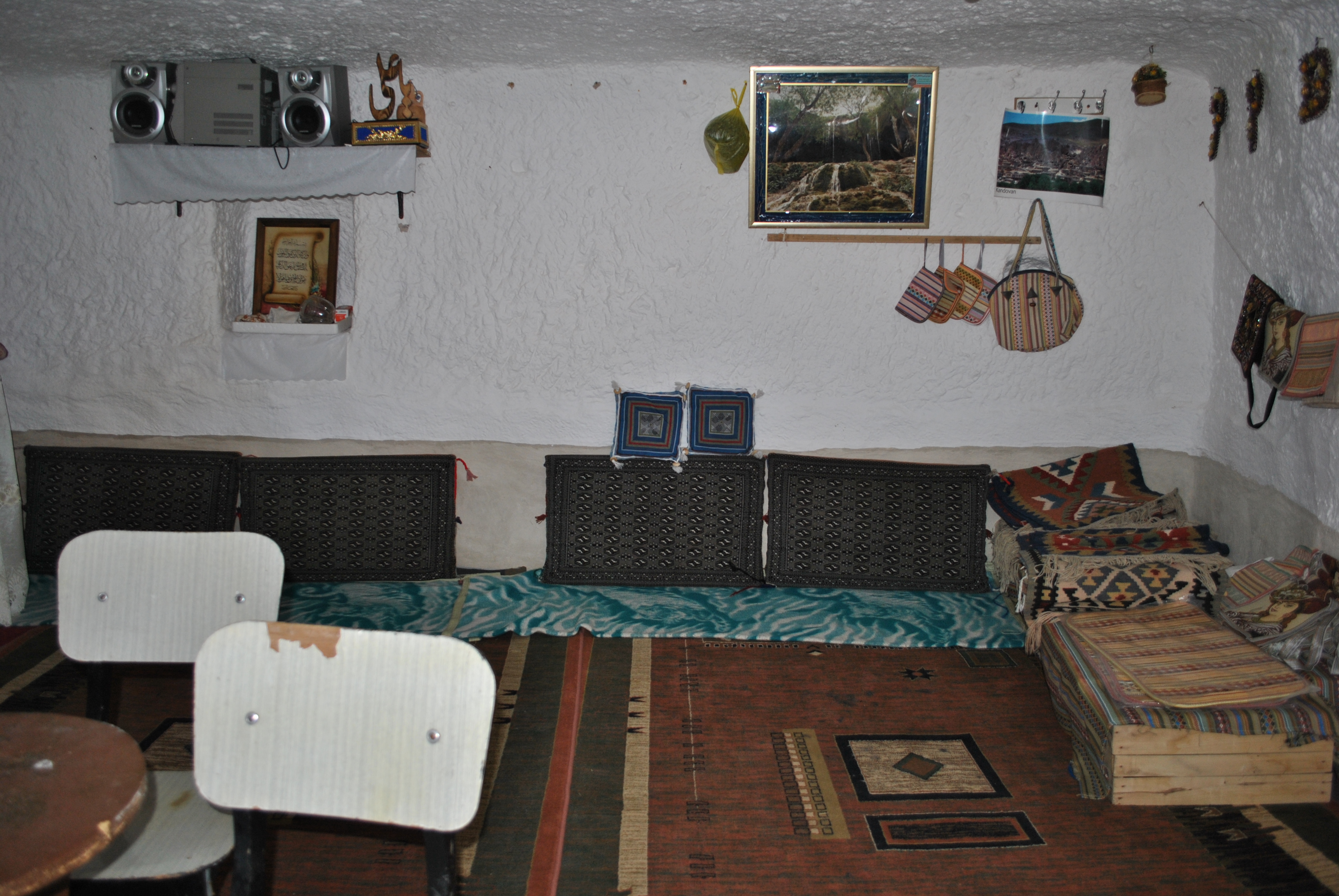
Interior of a traditional home

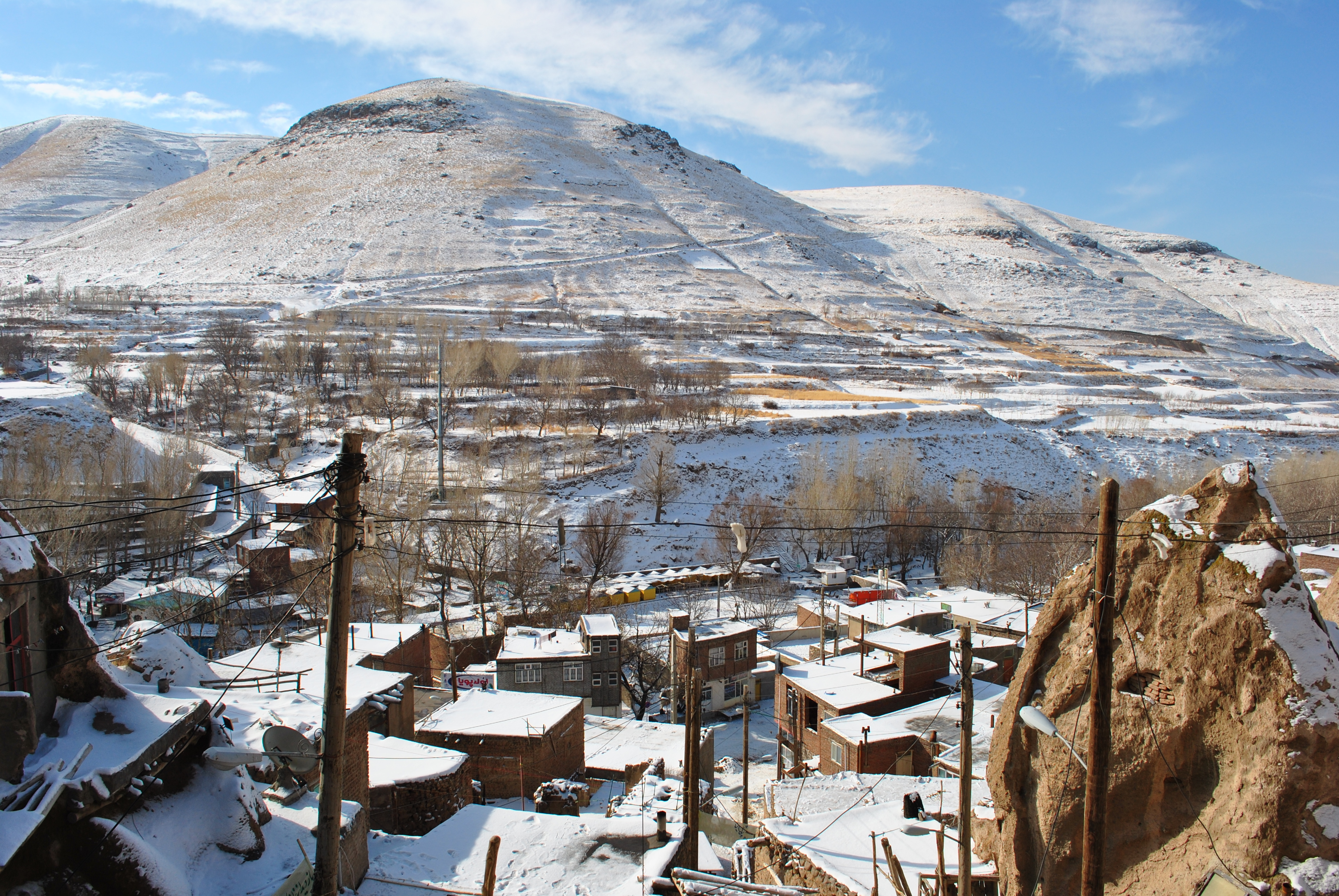
View of the village and surroundings from the rock houses

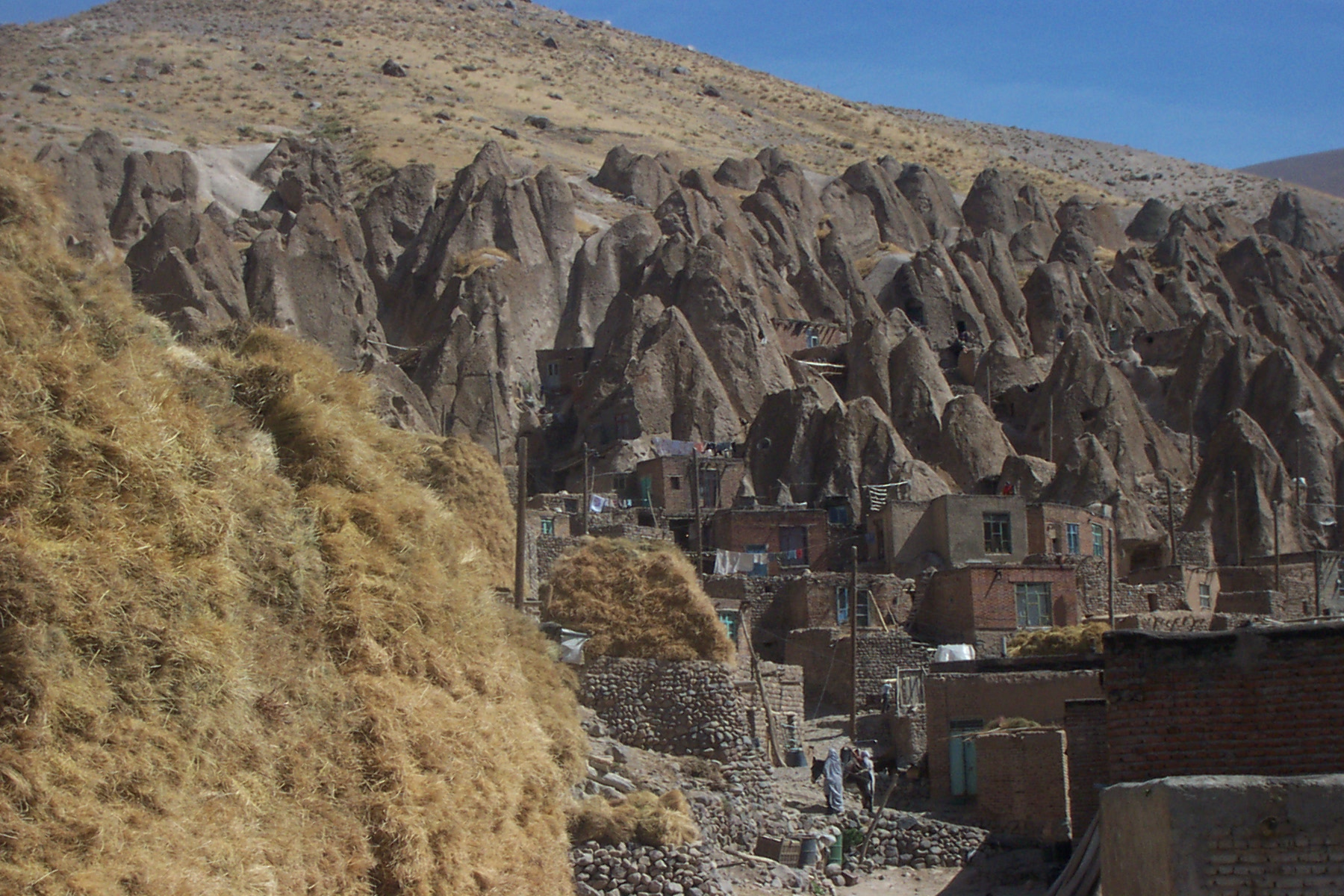

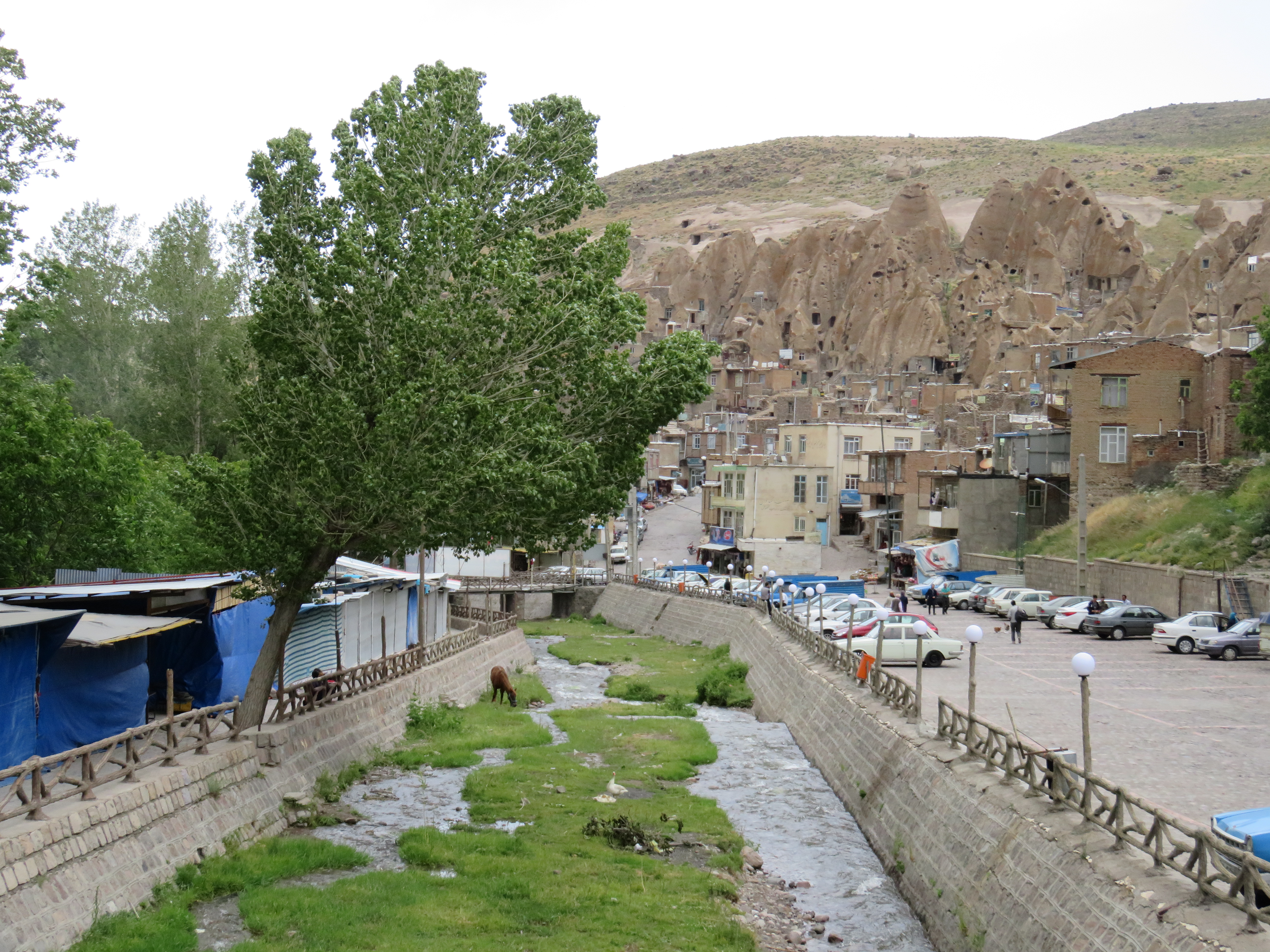

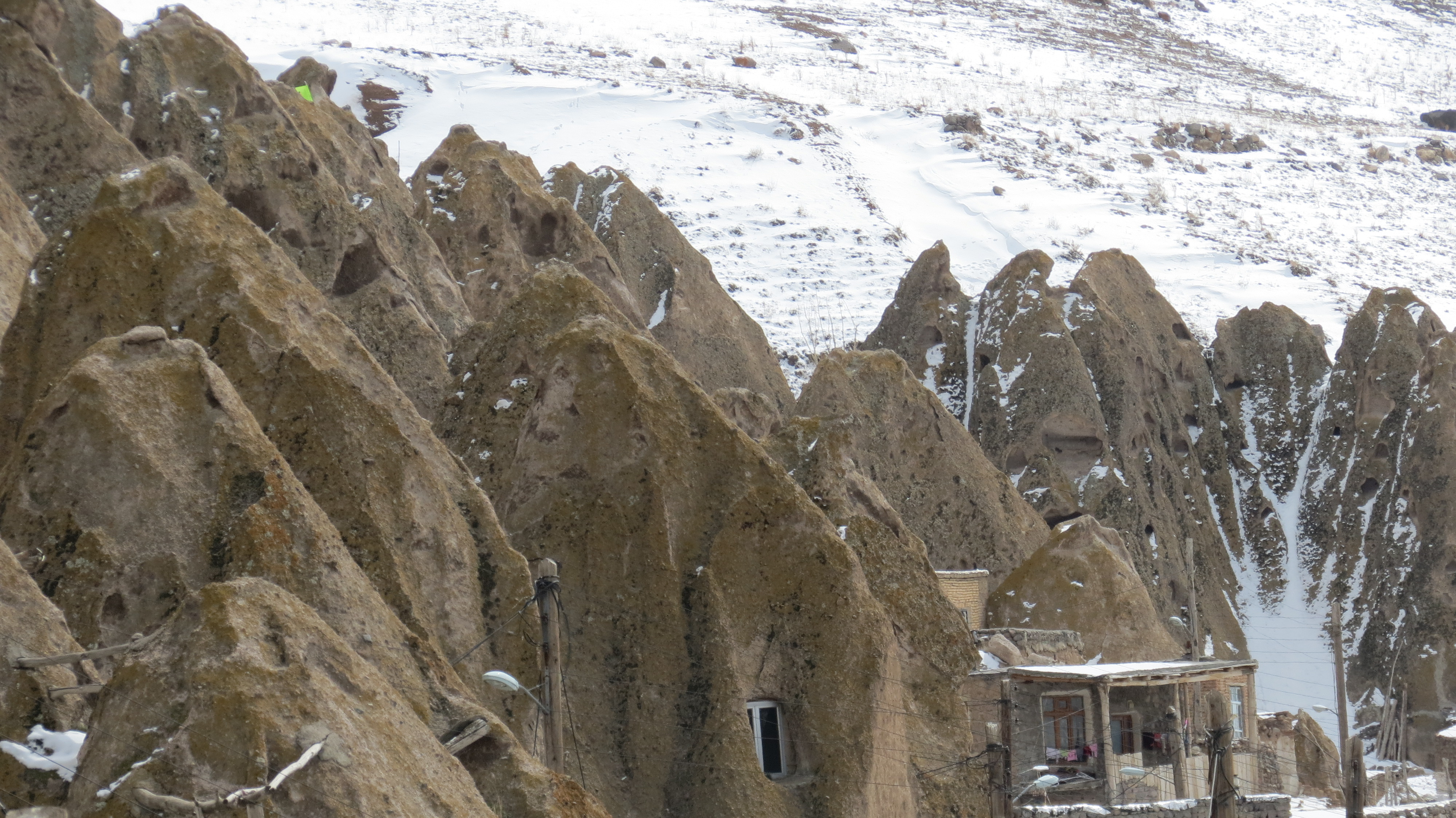

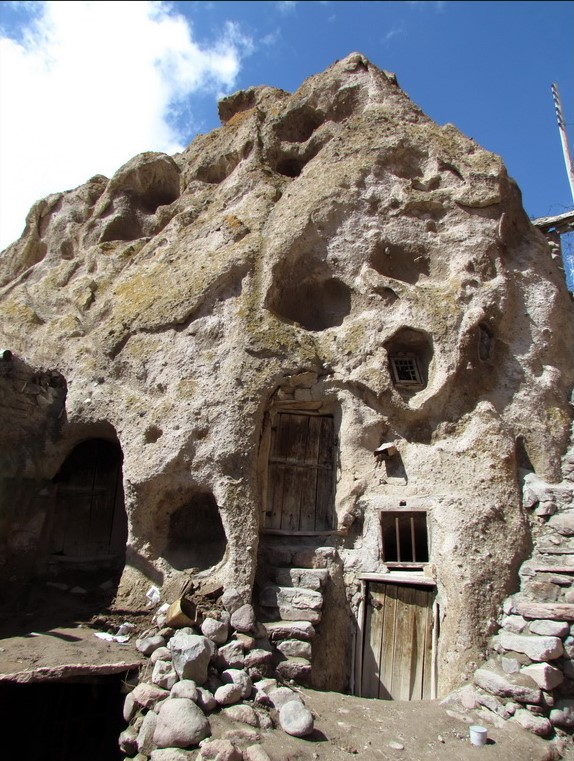

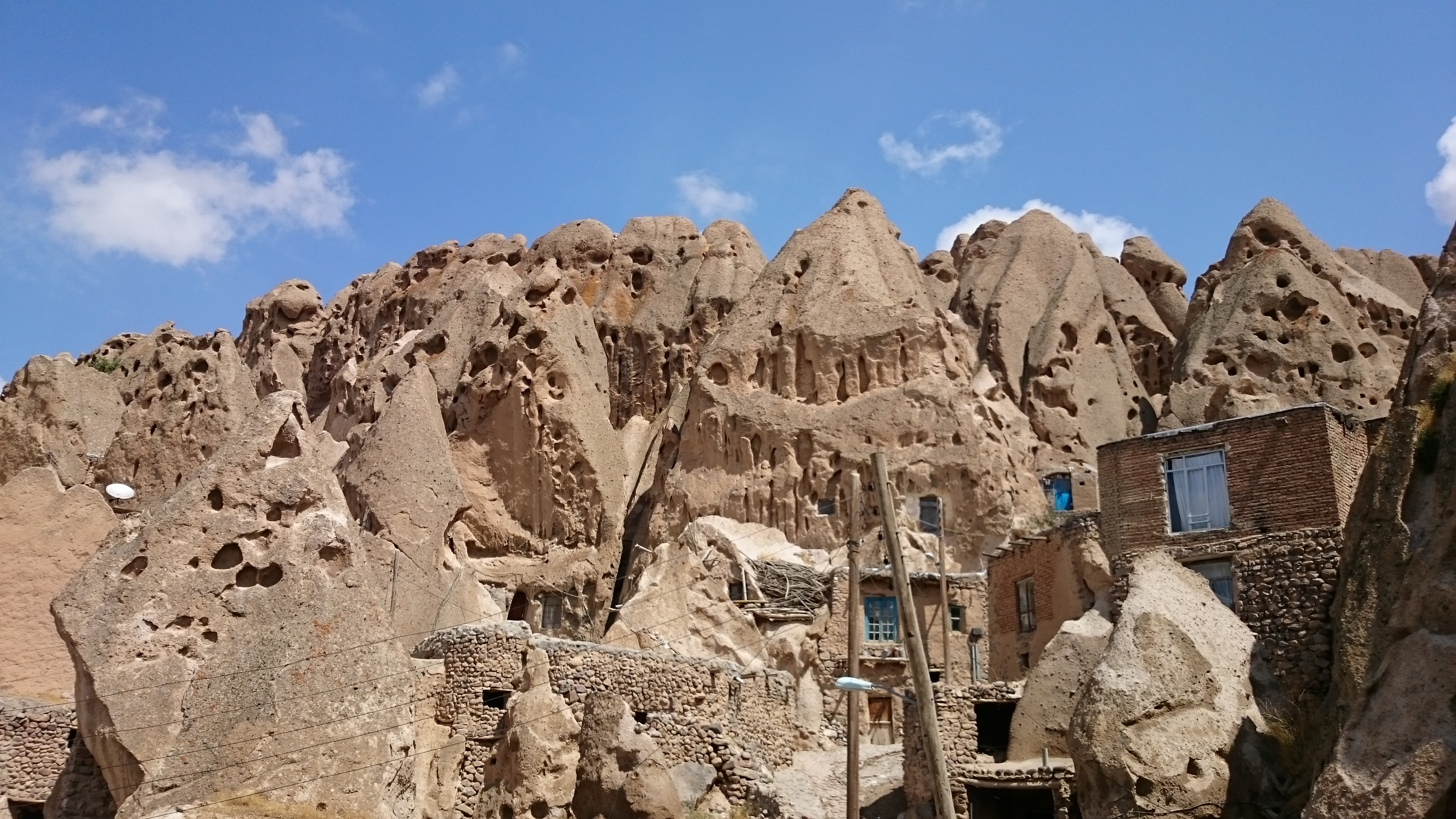

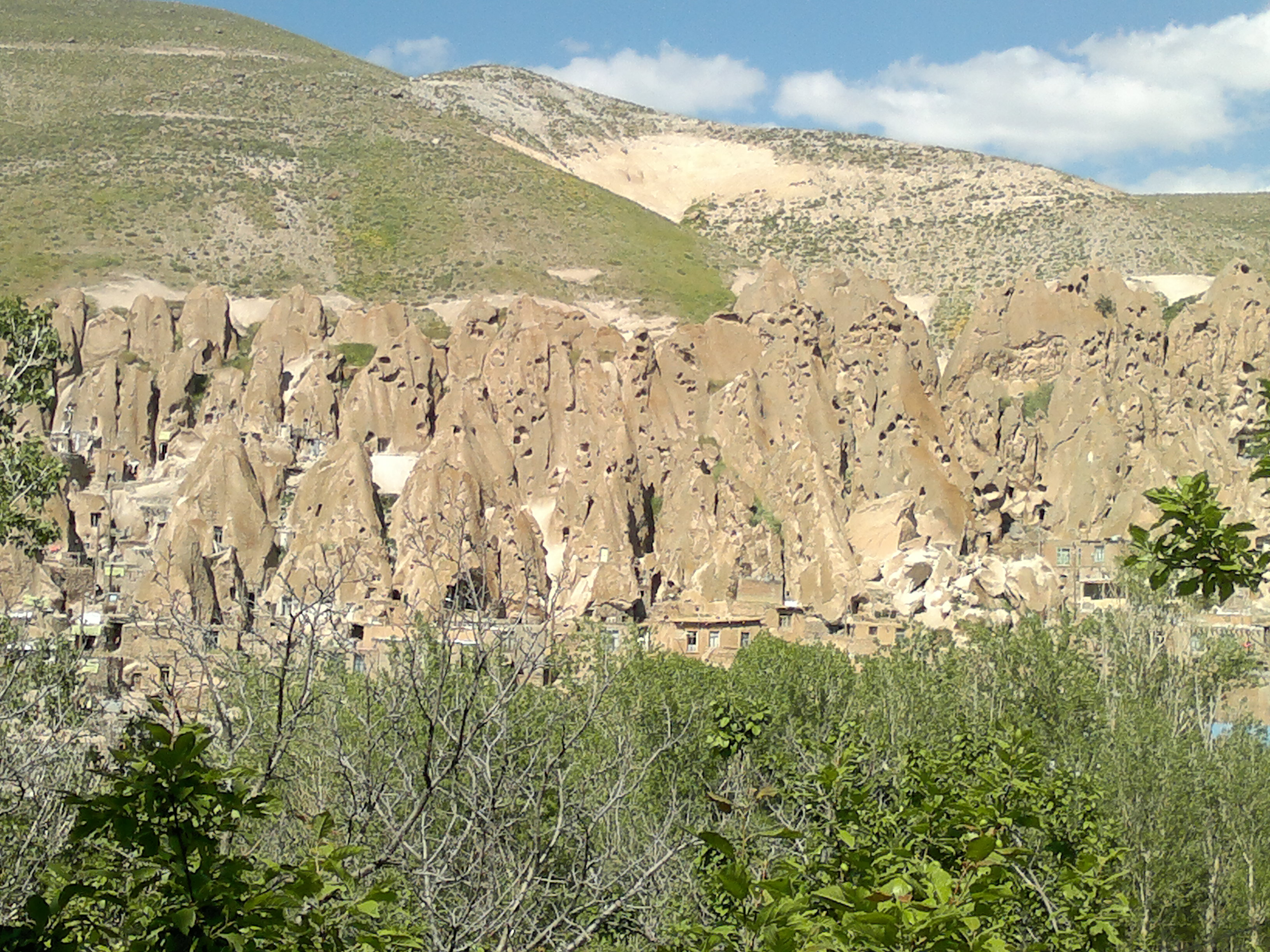

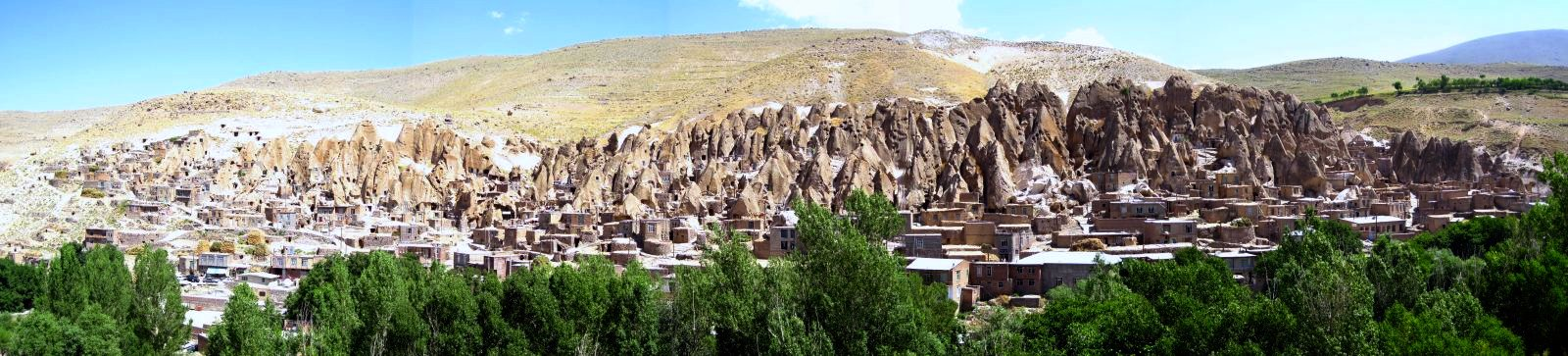

== See also ==
Media related to Kandovan at Wikimedia Commons
