= Jazireh Rural District =

Rural district in East Azerbaijan province, Iran

Jazireh Rural District Persian: دهستان جزيره
- Rural District
- Location within Iran
- Coordinates: 37°50′N 45°29′E
- Country: Iran
- Province: East Azerbaijan
- County: Osku
- District: Ilkhchi
- Established: 1987
- Capital: Saray Deh

Population (2016)
  - Total: 2,499
- Time zone: UTC+3:30 (IRST)

Jazireh Rural District (Persian: دهستان جزيره) is in Ilkhchi District of Osku County, East Azerbaijan province, Iran. Its capital is the village of Saray Deh.

== Demographics ==
=== Population ===
At the time of the 2006 National Census, the rural district's population was 3,574 in 1,047 households. There were 3,014 inhabitants in 1,058 households at the following census of 2011. The 2016 census measured the population of the rural district as 2,499 in 967 households. The most populous of its seven villages was Saray Deh, with 927 people.

=== Other villages in the rural district ===
- Aq Gonbad,
- Gamichi
- Qepchaq
