= Shurakat-e Jonubi Rural District =

Rural district in East Azerbaijan province, Iran

Shurakat-e Jonubi Rural District Persian: دهستان شورکات جنوبی
- Rural District
- Location within Iran
- Coordinates: 37°57′N 45°51′E
- Country: Iran
- Province: East Azerbaijan
- County: Osku
- District: Ilkhchi
- Established: 1987
- Capital: Khasabad

Population (2016)
  - Total: 11,745
- Time zone: UTC+3:30 (IRST)

Shurakat-e Jonubi Rural District (Persian: دهستان شورکات جنوبی) is in Ilkhchi District of Osku County, East Azerbaijan province, Iran. Its capital is the village of Khasabad.

== Demographics ==
=== Population ===
At the time of the 2006 National Census, the rural district's population was 10,307 in 2,644 households. There were 11,627 inhabitants in 3,275 households at the following census of 2011. The 2016 census measured the population of the rural district as 11,745 in 3,621 households. The most populous of its 17 villages was Kordlar, with 2,818 people.

=== Other villages in the rural district ===
- Beyglu
- Khasehlar
- Khvor Khvor
- Mehdinlu
- Sarin Dizaj
- Zeyn ol Hajjilu
