= Ilkhchi District =

District in East Azerbaijan province, Iran

Ilkhíchi District Persian: بخش ایلخچی
- District
- Location within Iran
- Coordinates: 37°54′N 45°40′E
- Country: Iran
- Province: East Azerbaijan
- County: Osku
- Established: 1997
- Capital: Ilkhíchi

Population (2016)
  - Total: 30,818
- Time zone: UTC+3:30 (IRST)

Ilkhíchi District (Persian: بخش ایلخچی) is in Osku County, East Azerbaijan province, Iran. Its capital is the city of Ilkhchi.

== Demographics ==
=== Population ===
At the time of the 2006 National Census, the district's population was 27,808 in 7,705 households. The following census in 2011 counted 29,872 people in 9,068 households. The 2016 census measured the population of the district as 30,818 inhabitants in 10,088 households.

=== Administrative divisions ===
Ilkhchi District Population
| Administrative Divisions | 2006 | 2011 | 2016 |
|---|---|---|---|
| Jazireh RD | 3,574 | 3,014 | 2,499 |
| Shurakat-e Jonubi RD | 10,307 | 11,627 | 11,745 |
| Ilkhchi (city) | 13,927 | 15,231 | 16,574 |
| Total | 27,808 | 29,872 | 30,818 |
RD = Rural District
