= Osku County =

County in East Azerbaijan province, Iran

Osku County Persian: شهرستان اسکو
- County
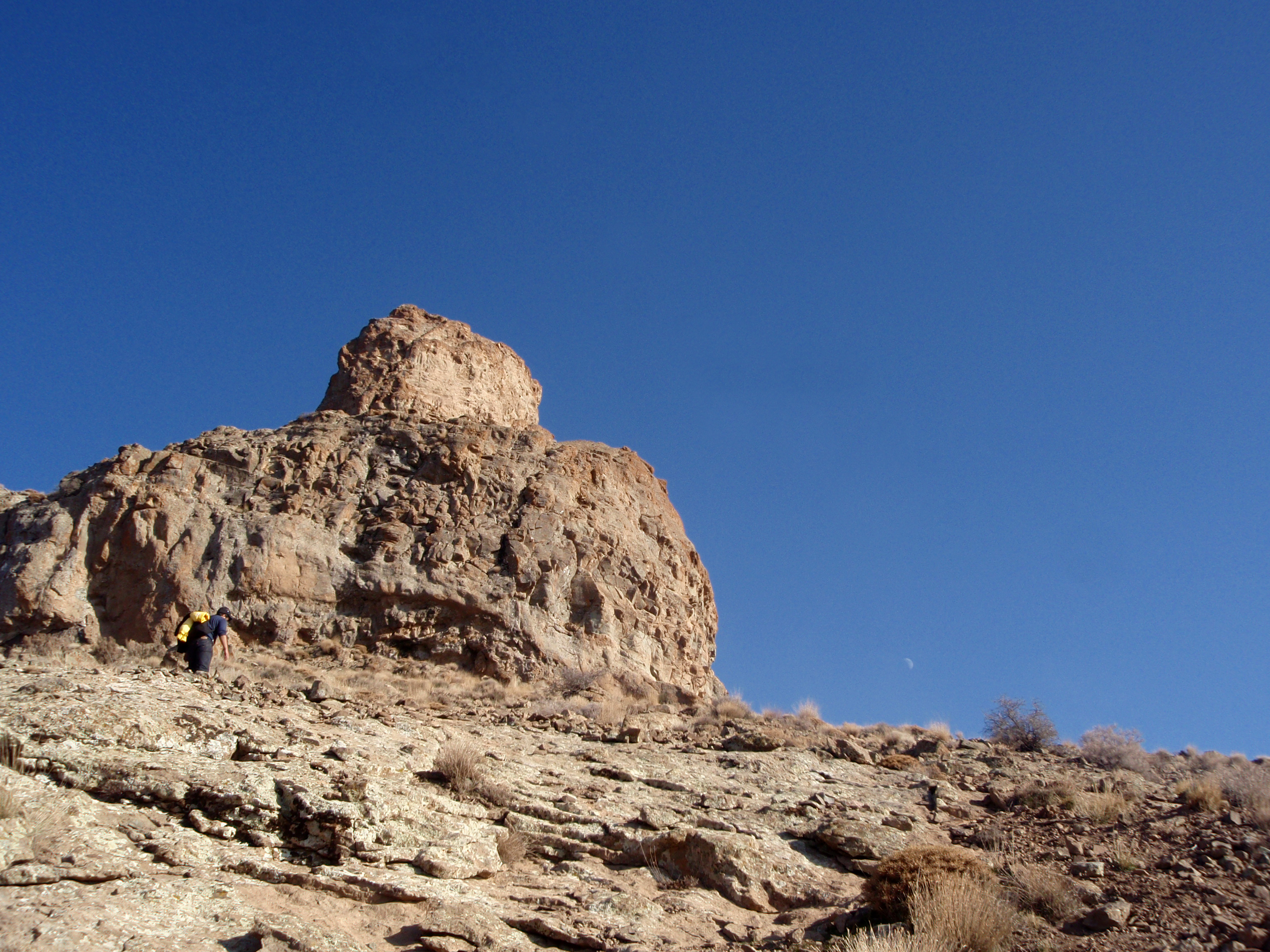
- Ruins of Hulagu Khan's castle

- Location of Osku County in East Azerbaijan province (center left, purple)

- Location of East Azerbaijan province in Iran
- Coordinates: 37°54′N 45°51′E
- Country: Iran
- Province: East Azerbaijan
- Established: 1997
- Capital: Osku
- Districts: Central, Ilkhchi

Population (2016)
  - Total: 158,270
- Time zone: UTC+3:30 (IRST)

Osku County (Persian: شهرستان اسکو) is in East Azerbaijan province, Iran. Its capital is the city of Osku.

Osku is one of the oldest cities in East Azerbaijan, according to old books, and is like stepping into a time machine. The city is located on a volcano hillside and has many caves in the city. Attractions such as Kandovan and natural landscapes make Osku one of the touristic cities in Iran. It is one of the few cities in Iran where batik printing centers still remain in operation. Osku is presently known as the capital of batik in Iran. Hilehvar historical village is another historical village near to the city, currently abandoned.

== History ==
The village of Sahand was elevated to the status of a city in 2008.

== Demographics ==
=== Ethnicity ===
The inhabitants of Osku are Azerbaijani Turks, who have lived in the city for more than 100 years.

=== Population ===
At the time of the 2006 census, the county's population was 84,061 in 23,613 households. The following census in 2011 counted 98,988 people in 30,091 households. The 2016 census measured the population of the county as 158,270 in 50,674 households.

=== Administrative divisions ===
Osku County's population history and administrative structure over three consecutive censuses are shown in the following table.

Osku County Population
Administrative Divisions	2006	2011	2016
Central District	56,253	69,116	127,452
Bavil RD	23,318	9,792	9,397
Gonbar RD	7,315	7,704	7,763
Sahand RD	9,480	9,933	9,339
Osku (city)	16,140	16,983	18,459
Sahand (city)		24,704	82,494
Ilkhchi District	27,808	29,872	30,818
Jazireh RD	3,574	3,014	2,499
Shurakat-e Jonubi RD	10,307	11,627	11,745
Ilkhchi (city)	13,927	15,231	16,574
Total	84,061	98,988	158,270
RD = Rural District

== See also ==
Media related to Osku County at Wikimedia Commons
