= Kuran, East Azerbaijan =

Village in East Azerbaijan province, Iran

Kuran Persian: كورن
- Village
- Location within Iran
- Coordinates: 38°57′13″N 47°26′09″E
- Country: Iran
- Province: East Azerbaijan
- County: Hurand
- District: Chahardangeh
- Rural District: Chahardangeh-ye Jonubi

Population (2016)
  - Total: 403
- Time zone: UTC+3:30 (IRST)

Kuran (Persian: كورن) (Note: Also romanized as Kūran; also known as Kahrān) is a village in, and the capital of, Chahardangeh-ye Jonubi Rural District in Chahardangeh District of Hurand County, East Azerbaijan province, Iran.

== Demographics ==
=== Population ===
At the time of the 2006 National Census, the village's population was 524 in 114 households, when it was in Dodangeh Rural District of the former Hurand District in Ahar County. The following census in 2011 counted 506 people in 147 households. The 2016 census measured the population of the village as 403 people in 135 households.

In 2018, the district was separated from the county in the establishment of Hurand County, and the rural district was transferred to the new Central District. Kuran was transferred to Chahardangeh-ye Jonubi Rural District created in the new Chahardangeh District.
