= Deh Abbas =

Deh Abbas or Deh-e Abbas (Persian: ده عباس) may refer to:

- Deh-e Abbas, Kerman
- Deh Abbas, Kermanshah
- Deh Abbas, Salas-e Babajani, Kermanshah Province
- Deh-e Abbas, Sonqor, Kermanshah Province
- Deh Abbas, Tehran
- Deh Abbas Rural District, Tehran Province
