= Kavir =

Village in East Azerbaijan province, Iran

Kavir Persian: كوير
- Village
- Location within Iran
- Coordinates: 38°58′11″N 47°24′28″E
- Country: Iran
- Province: East Azerbaijan
- County: Hurand
- District: Chahardangeh
- Rural District: Chahardangeh-ye Jonubi

Population (2016)
  - Total: 311
- Time zone: UTC+3:30 (IRST)

Kavir (Persian: كوير) (Note: Also romanized as Kavīr) is a village in Chahardangeh-ye Jonubi Rural District of Chahardangeh District in Hurand County, East Azerbaijan province, Iran.

== Demographics ==
=== Population ===
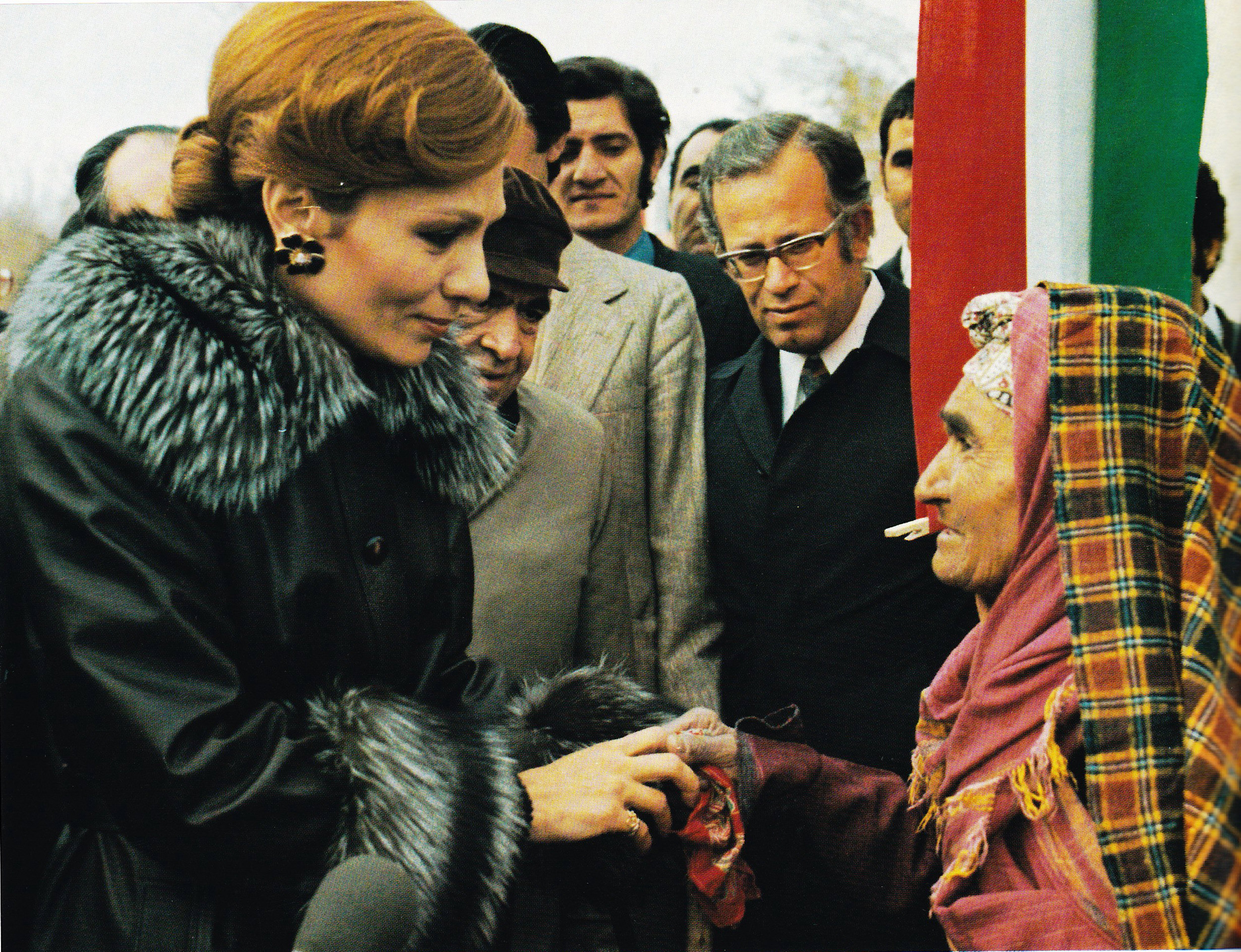
Empress Farah Pahlavi during a visit to Kavir, 1974

At the time of the 2006 National Census, the village's population was 357 in 71 households, when it was in Chahardangeh Rural District (Note: Renamed Chahardangeh-ye Shomali Rural District) of the former Hurand District in Ahar County. The following census in 2011 counted 285 people in 70 households. The 2016 census measured the population of the village as 311 people in 89 households.

In 2018, the district was separated from the county in the establishment of Hurand County. The rural district was transferred to the new Chahardangeh District and renamed Chahardangeh-ye Shomali Rural District. Kavir was transferred to Chahardangeh-ye Jonubi Rural District created in the same district.
