= Navansar =

Village in East Azerbaijan province, Iran

Navansar Persian: نوانسر
- Village
- Location within Iran
- Coordinates: 38°42′39″N 47°26′26″E
- Country: Iran
- Province: East Azerbaijan
- County: Hurand
- District: Central
- Rural District: Dikleh

Population (2016)
  - Total: 322
- Time zone: UTC+3:30 (IRST)

Navansar (Persian: نوانسر) (Note: Also romanized as Navānsar; also known as Narvansar and Navāsar) is a village in Dikleh Rural District of the Central District in Hurand County, East Azerbaijan province, Iran.

== Demographics ==
=== Population ===
At the time of the 2006 National Census, the village's population was 466 in 95 households, when it was in the former Hurand District of Ahar County. The following census in 2011 counted 448 people in 105 households. The 2016 census measured the population of the village as 322 people in 88 households.

In 2018, the district was separated from the county in the establishment of Hurand County, and the rural district was transferred to the new Central District.
