= Arnan, East Azerbaijan =

Village in East Azerbaijan province, Iran

Arnan Persian: ارنان
- Village
- Location within Iran
- Coordinates: 38°58′43″N 47°25′58″E
- Country: Iran
- Province: East Azerbaijan
- County: Hurand
- District: Chahardangeh
- Rural District: Chahardangeh-ye Jonubi

Population (2016)
  - Total: 687
- Time zone: UTC+3:30 (IRST)

Arnan (Persian: ارنان) (Note: Also romanized as Arnān) is a village in Chahardangeh-ye Jonubi Rural District of Chahardangeh District in Hurand County, East Azerbaijan province, Iran.

== Demographics ==
=== Population ===
At the time of the 2006 National Census, the village's population was 774 in 169 households, when it was in Chahardangeh Rural District (Note: Renamed Chahardangeh-ye Shomali Rural District) of the former Hurand District in Ahar County. The following census in 2011 counted 693 people in 180 households. The 2016 census measured the population of the village as 687 people in 200 households. It was the most populous village in its rural district.

In 2018, the district was separated from the county in the establishment of Hurand County. The rural district was transferred to the new Chahardangeh District and renamed Chahardangeh-ye Shomali Rural District. Arnan was transferred to Chahardangeh-ye Jonubi Rural District created in the same district.
