= Bahmanabad, Tehran =

Village in Tehran province, Iran

Bahmanabad Persian: بهمن اباد
- Village
- Location within Iran
- Coordinates: 35°36′07″N 51°11′48″E
- Country: Iran
- Province: Tehran
- County: Eslamshahr
- District: Ahmadabad-e Mostowfi
- Rural District: Chichaklu

Population (2016)
  - Total: 146
- Time zone: UTC+3:30 (IRST)

Bahmanabad (Persian: بهمن اباد) (Note: Also romanized as Bahmanābād) is a village in Chichaklu Rural District of Ahmadabad-e Mostowfi District in Eslamshahr County, Tehran province, Iran.

== Demographics ==
=== Population ===
At the time of the 2006 National Census, the village's population was 189 in 44 households, when it was in Ahmadabad-e Mostowfi Rural District of the Central District. The following census in 2011 counted 128 people in 30 households. The 2016 census measured the population of the village as 146 people in 41 households, by which time the village had been transferred to Chichaklu Rural District created in the new Ahmadabad-e Mostowfi District.
