= Pashtab =

Village in East Azerbaijan province, Iran

Pashtab Persian: پشتاب
- Village
- Location within Iran
- Coordinates: 38°47′36″N 47°24′59″E
- Country: Iran
- Province: East Azerbaijan
- County: Hurand
- District: Central
- Rural District: Dodangeh

Population (2016)
  - Total: 267
- Time zone: UTC+3:30 (IRST)

Pashtab (Persian: پشتاب) (Note: Also romanized as Pashtāb) is a village in Dodangeh Rural District of the Central District in Hurand County, East Azerbaijan province, Iran.

== Demographics ==
=== Population ===
At the time of the 2006 National Census, the village's population was 262 in 57 households, when it was in the former Hurand District of Ahar County. The following census in 2011 counted 269 people in 63 households. The 2016 census measured the population of the village as 267 people in 65 households.

In 2018, the district was separated from the county in the establishment of Hurand County, and the rural district was transferred to the new Central District.
