= Moradlu, Hurand =

Village in East Azerbaijan province, Iran

Moradlu Persian: مرادلو
- Village
- Location within Iran
- Coordinates: 38°45′19″N 47°19′45″E
- Country: Iran
- Province: East Azerbaijan
- County: Hurand
- District: Central
- Rural District: Dikleh

Population (2016)
  - Total: 512
- Time zone: UTC+3:30 (IRST)

Moradlu (Persian: مرادلو) (Note: Also romanized as Morādlū) is a village in Dikleh Rural District of the Central District in Hurand County, East Azerbaijan province, Iran.

== Demographics ==
=== Population ===
At the time of the 2006 National Census, the village's population was 438 in 97 households, when it was in the former Hurand District of Ahar County. The following census in 2011 counted 456 people in 124 households. The 2016 census measured the population of the village as 512 people in 163 households. It was the most populous village in its rural district.

In 2018, the district was separated from the county in the establishment of Hurand County, and the rural district was transferred to the new Central District.
