= Mardilu =

Village in East Azerbaijan province, Iran

Mardilu Persian: مردي لو
- Village
- Location within Iran
- Coordinates: 39°03′44″N 47°29′44″E
- Country: Iran
- Province: East Azerbaijan
- County: Hurand
- District: Chahardangeh
- Rural District: Chahardangeh-ye Shomali

Population (2016)
  - Total: 600
- Time zone: UTC+3:30 (IRST)

Mardilu (Persian: مردي لو) (Note: Also romanized as Mardīlū; also known as Mardlū) is a village in Chahardangeh-ye Shomali Rural District (Note: Formerly Chahardangeh Rural District) of Chahardangeh District of Hurand County, East Azerbaijan province, Iran.

== Demographics ==
=== Population ===
At the time of the 2006 National Census, the village's population was 515 in 84 households, when it was in Chahardangeh Rural District (Note: Renamed Chahardangeh-ye Shomali Rural District) of the former Hurand District in Ahar County. The following census in 2011 counted 401 people in 98 households. The 2016 census measured the population of the village as 600 people in 144 households.

In 2018, the district was separated from the county in the establishment of Hurand County. The rural district was transferred to the new Chahardangeh District and renamed Chahardangeh-ye Shomali Rural District.
