= Qaleh Kandi, Hurand =

Village in East Azerbaijan province, Iran

Qaleh Kandi Persian: قلعه كندي
- Village
- Location within Iran
- Coordinates: 38°59′11″N 47°23′59″E
- Country: Iran
- Province: East Azerbaijan
- County: Hurand
- District: Chahardangeh
- Rural District: Chahardangeh-ye Jonubi

Population (2016)
  - Total: 311
- Time zone: UTC+3:30 (IRST)

Qaleh Kandi (Persian: قلعه كندي) (Note: Also romanized as Qal‘eh Kandī) is a village in Chahardangeh-ye Jonubi Rural District of Chahardangeh District in Hurand County, East Azerbaijan province, Iran.

== Demographics ==
=== Population ===
At the time of the 2006 National Census, the village's population was 293 in 55 households, when it was in Chahardangeh Rural District (Note: Renamed Chahardangeh-ye Shomali Rural District) of the former Hurand District in Ahar County. The following census in 2011 counted 321 people in 72 households. The 2016 census measured the population of the village as 311 people in 81 households.

In 2018, the district was separated from the county in the establishment of Hurand County. The rural district was transferred to the new Chahardangeh District and renamed Chahardangeh-ye Shomali Rural District. Qaleh Kandi was transferred to Chahardangeh-ye Jonubi Rural District created in the same district.
