= Huri Daraq =

Village in East Azerbaijan province, Iran

Huri Daraq Persian: حوريدرق
- Village
- Location within Iran
- Coordinates: 38°45′41″N 47°18′40″E
- Country: Iran
- Province: East Azerbaijan
- County: Hurand
- District: Central
- Rural District: Dikleh

Population (2016)
  - Total: 454
- Time zone: UTC+3:30 (IRST)

Huri Daraq (Persian: حوريدرق) (Note: Also romanized as Ḩūrī Daraq) is a village in Dikleh Rural District of the Central District in Hurand County, East Azerbaijan province, Iran.

== Demographics ==
=== Population ===
At the time of the 2006 National Census, the village's population was 487 in 115 households, when it was in the former Hurand District of Ahar County. The following census in 2011 counted 416 people in 113 households. The 2016 census measured the population of the village as 454 people in 143 households.

In 2018, the district was separated from the county in the establishment of Hurand County, and the rural district was transferred to the new Central District.
