= Qamishlu, East Azerbaijan =

Village in East Azerbaijan province, Iran

Qamishlu Persian: قميشلو
- Village
- Location within Iran
- Coordinates: 39°03′43″N 47°28′40″E
- Country: Iran
- Province: East Azerbaijan
- County: Hurand
- District: Chahardangeh
- Rural District: Chahardangeh-ye Shomali

Population (2016)
  - Total: 580
- Time zone: UTC+3:30 (IRST)

Qamishlu (Persian: قميشلو) (Note: Also romanized as Qamīshlū; also known as Mamīshlū (مميشلو), Qameshlū, and Qamshīdī) is a village in Chahardangeh-ye Shomali Rural District (Note: Formerly Chahardangeh Rural District) of Chahardangeh District of Hurand County, East Azerbaijan province, Iran.

== Demographics ==
=== Population ===
At the time of the 2006 National Census, the village's population was 490 in 85 households, when it was in Chahardangeh Rural District (Note: Renamed Chahardangeh-ye Shomali Rural District) of the former Hurand District in Ahar County. The following census in 2011 counted 593 people in 156 households. The 2016 census measured the population of the village as 580 people in 163 households.

In 2018, the district was separated from the county in the establishment of Hurand County. The rural district was transferred to the new Chahardangeh District and renamed Chahardangeh-ye Shomali Rural District.
