= Dehrud, East Azerbaijan =

Village in East Azerbaijan province, Iran

Dehrud Persian: ده رود
- Village
- Location within Iran
- Coordinates: 38°55′06″N 47°15′44″E
- Country: Iran
- Province: East Azerbaijan
- County: Hurand
- District: Central
- Rural District: Dodangeh

Population (2016)
  - Total: 245
- Time zone: UTC+3:30 (IRST)

Dehrud (Persian: ده رود) (Note: Also romanized as Dahroud and Dehrūd; also known as Dehri in Turkish) is a village in Dodangeh Rural District of the Central District in Hurand County, East Azerbaijan province, Iran.

== Demographics ==
=== Population ===
At the time of the 2006 National Census, the village's population was 420 in 89 households, when it was in the former Hurand District of Ahar County. The following census in 2011 counted 291 people in 86 households. The 2016 census measured the population of the village as 245 people in 80 households.

In 2018, the district was separated from the county in the establishment of Hurand County, and the rural district was transferred to the new Central District.
