= Majidabad, Hurand =

Village in East Azerbaijan province, Iran

Majidabad Persian: مجيداباد
- Village
- Location within Iran
- Coordinates: 38°43′07″N 47°19′48″E
- Country: Iran
- Province: East Azerbaijan
- County: Hurand
- District: Central
- Rural District: Dikleh

Population (2016)
  - Total: 341
- Time zone: UTC+3:30 (IRST)

Majidabad (Persian: مجيداباد) (Note: Also romanized as Majīdābād) is a village in, and the capital of, Dikleh Rural District in the Central District of Hurand County, East Azerbaijan province, Iran.

== Demographics ==
=== Population ===
At the time of the 2006 National Census, the village's population was 436 in 100 households, when it was in the former Hurand District of Ahar County. The following census in 2011 counted 516 people in 126 households. The 2016 census measured the population of the village as 341 people in 97 households.

In 2018, the district was separated from the county in the establishment of Hurand County, and the rural district was transferred to the new Central District.
