= Gavlan, East Azerbaijan =

Village in East Azerbaijan province, Iran

Gavlan Persian: گولان
- Village
- Location within Iran
- Coordinates: 38°48′56″N 47°29′36″E
- Country: Iran
- Province: East Azerbaijan
- County: Hurand
- District: Central
- Rural District: Dodangeh

Population (2016)
  - Total: 257
- Time zone: UTC+3:30 (IRST)

Gavlan (Persian: گولان) (Note: Also romanized as Gavlān; also known as Ghūlān, Golan, and Qūlān) is a village in Dodangeh Rural District of the Central District in Hurand County, East Azerbaijan province, Iran.

== Demographics ==
=== Population ===
At the time of the 2006 National Census, the village's population was 231 in 42 households, when it was in the former Hurand District of Ahar County. The following census in 2011 counted 218 people in 48 households. The 2016 census measured the population of the village as 257 people in 67 households.

In 2018, the district was separated from the county in the establishment of Hurand County, and the rural district was transferred to the new Central District.
