= Aznab =

Aznab (Persian: ازناب), also rendered as Aznavi, may refer to:

- Aznab-e Khaleseh, East Azerbaijan Province
- Aznab, Qazvin
- Aznab, Zanjan
- Aznab-e Olya (disambiguation)
- Aznab-e Sofla (disambiguation)
