= Mohammadabad, East Azerbaijan =

Village in East Azerbaijan province, Iran

Mohammadabad Persian: محمداباد
- Village
- Location within Iran
- Coordinates: 38°47′46″N 47°16′02″E
- Country: Iran
- Province: East Azerbaijan
- County: Hurand
- District: Central
- Rural District: Dodangeh

Population (2016)
  - Total: 87
- Time zone: UTC+3:30 (IRST)

Mohammadabad (Persian: محمداباد) (Note: Also romanized as Moḩammadābād) is a village in Dodangeh Rural District of the Central District in Hurand County, East Azerbaijan province, Iran.

== Demographics ==
=== Population ===
At the time of the 2006 National Census, the village's population was 110 in 28 households, when it was in the former Hurand District of Ahar County. The following census in 2011 counted 94 people in 24 households. The 2016 census measured the population of the village as 87 people in 23 households.

In 2018, the district was separated from the county in the establishment of Hurand County and the rural district was transferred to the new Central District.
