= Injar =

Village in East Azerbaijan province, Iran

Injar Persian: اينجار
- Village
- Location within Iran
- Coordinates: 38°49′12″N 47°21′42″E
- Country: Iran
- Province: East Azerbaijan
- County: Hurand
- District: Central
- Rural District: Dodangeh

Population (2016)
  - Total: 708
- Time zone: UTC+3:30 (IRST)

Injar (Persian: اينجار) (Note: Also romanized as Īnjār) is a village in Dodangeh Rural District of the Central District in Hurand County, East Azerbaijan province, Iran.

== Demographics ==
=== Population ===
At the time of the 2006 National Census, the village's population was 927 in 190 households, when it was in the former Hurand District of Ahar County. The following census in 2011 counted 805 people in 224 households. The 2016 census measured the population of the village as 708 people in 202 households. It was the most populous village in its rural district.

In 2018, the district was separated from the county in the establishment of Hurand County, and the rural district was transferred to the new Central District.
