= Tabestanaq =

Village in East Azerbaijan province, Iran

Tabestanaq Persian: تابستانق
- Village
- Location within Iran
- Coordinates: 39°00′28″N 47°25′15″E
- Country: Iran
- Province: East Azerbaijan
- County: Hurand
- District: Chahardangeh
- Rural District: Chahardangeh-ye Shomali

Population (2016)
  - Total: 431
- Time zone: UTC+3:30 (IRST)

Tabestanaq (Persian: تابستانق) (Note: Also romanized as Tābestānaq; also known as Tābeslānaq) is a village in Chahardangeh-ye Shomali Rural District (Note: Formerly Chahardangeh Rural District) of Chahardangeh District of Hurand County, East Azerbaijan province, Iran.

== Demographics ==
=== Population ===
At the time of the 2006 National Census, the village's population was 431 in 129 households, when it was in Chahardangeh Rural District (Note: Renamed Chahardangeh-ye Shomali Rural District) of the former Hurand District in Ahar County. The following census in 2011 counted 457 people in 127 households. The 2016 census measured the population of the village as 431 people in 129 households.

In 2018, the district was separated from the county in the establishment of Hurand County. The rural district was transferred to the new Chahardangeh District and renamed Chahardangeh-ye Shomali Rural District.
