= Qarah Qayah-ye Shakarlu =

Village in East Azerbaijan province, Iran

Qarah Qayah-ye Shakarlu Persian: قره قيه شكرلو
- Village
- Location within Iran
- Country: Iran
- Province: East Azerbaijan
- County: Hurand
- District: Chahardangeh
- Rural District: Chahardangeh-ye Shomali

Population (2016)
  - Total: 629
- Time zone: UTC+3:30 (IRST)

Qarah Qayah-ye Shakarlu (Persian: قره قيه شكرلو) (Note: Also romanized as Qarah Qayah-ye Shakarlū; also known as Qarah Qayah) is a village in Chahardangeh-ye Shomali Rural District (Note: Formerly Chahardangeh Rural District) of Chahardangeh District of Hurand County, East Azerbaijan province, Iran.

== Demographics ==
=== Population ===
At the time of the 2006 National Census, the village's population was 602 in 103 households, when it was in Chahardangeh Rural District (Note: Renamed Chahardangeh-ye Shomali Rural District) of the former Hurand District in Ahar County. The following census in 2011 counted 546 people in 140 households. The 2016 census measured the population of the village as 629 people in 179 households.

In 2018, the district was separated from the county in the establishment of Hurand County. The rural district was transferred to the new Chahardangeh District and renamed Chahardangeh-ye Shomali Rural District.
