= Leghlan =

Village in East Azerbaijan province, Iran

Leghlan Persian: لغلان
- Village
- Location within Iran
- Coordinates: 38°51′40″N 47°28′55″E
- Country: Iran
- Province: East Azerbaijan
- County: Hurand
- District: Central
- Rural District: Dodangeh

Population (2016)
  - Total: 282
- Time zone: UTC+3:30 (IRST)

Leghlan (Persian: لغلان) (Note: Also romanized as Leghlān; also known as Leqalān and Lihlan) is a village in Dodangeh Rural District of the Central District in Hurand County, East Azerbaijan province, Iran.

== Demographics ==
=== Population ===
At the time of the 2006 National Census, the village's population was 279 in 63 households, when it was in the former Hurand District of Ahar County. The following census in 2011 counted 281 people in 84 households. The 2016 census measured the population of the village as 282 people in 81 households.

In 2018, the district was separated from the county in the establishment of Hurand County, and the rural district was transferred to the new Central District.
