= Shalvari =

Shalvari شلوري
- Village
- Location within Iran
- Coordinates: 38°53′25″N 47°19′53″E
- Country: Iran
- Province: East Azerbaijan
- County: Ahar
- Bakhsh: Hurand
- Rural District: Dodangeh

Population (2006)
  - Total: 56
- Time zone: UTC+3:30 (IRST)
  - Summer (DST): UTC+4:30 (IRDT)

Shalvari (Persian: شلوري, also Romanized as Shalvārī; also known as Shīlvand) is a village in Dodangeh Rural District, Hurand District, Ahar County, East Azerbaijan Province, Iran. At the 2006 census, its population was 56, in 8 families.
