= Mehranabad =

Village in Tehran province, Iran

Mehranabad Persian: مهران اباد
- Village
- Location within Iran
- Coordinates: 35°34′08″N 51°17′29″E
- Country: Iran
- Province: Tehran
- County: Eslamshahr
- District: Central
- Rural District: Bahramabad

Population (2016)
  - Total: 254
- Time zone: UTC+3:30 (IRST)

Mehranabad (Persian: مهران اباد) (Note: Also romanized as Mehrānābād; also known as Mehrānābād va Feyzābād, Mehrānābād-e Feyzābād, and Mihrānābād) is a village in Bahramabad Rural District of the Central District in Eslamshahr County, Tehran province, Iran.

== Demographics ==
=== Population ===
At the time of the 2006 National Census, the village's population was 245 in 64 households, when it was in Deh Abbas Rural District. The following census in 2011 counted 206 people in 59 households. The 2016 census measured the population of the village as 254 people in 86 households, by which time it had been transferred to Bahramabad Rural District created in the Central District.
