= Ampar =

Ampar امپار
- Village
- Location within Iran
- Coordinates: 38°38′34″N 47°13′33″E
- Country: Iran
- Province: East Azerbaijan
- County: Ahar
- Bakhsh: Hurand
- Rural District: Dikleh

Population (2006)
  - Total: 78
- Time zone: UTC+3:30 (IRST)
  - Summer (DST): UTC+4:30 (IRDT)

Ampar (Persian: امپار, also Romanized as Āmpār) is a village in Dikleh Rural District, Hurand District, Ahar County, East Azerbaijan Province, Iran. At the 2006 census, its population was 78, in 17 families.
