= Davudlu =

Davudlu or Dovudlu may refer to:

- Davudlu, Agdash, Azerbaijan
- Davudlu, Qubadli, Azerbaijan
- Davudlu, Iran
