= Shatareh =

Village in Tehran province, Iran

Shatareh Persian: شاطره
- Village
- Location within Iran
- Coordinates: 35°35′13″N 51°17′20″E
- Country: Iran
- Province: Tehran
- County: Eslamshahr
- District: Central
- Rural District: Bahramabad

Population (2016)
  - Total: 7,150
- Time zone: UTC+3:30 (IRST)

Shatareh (Persian: شاطره) (Note: Also romanized as Shāţareh; also known as Shāh Ţarreh) is a village in Bahramabad Rural District of the Central District of Eslamshahr County, Tehran province, Iran.

== Demographics ==
=== Population ===
At the time of the 2006 National Census, the village's population was 9,477 in 2,315 households, when it was in Ahmadabad-e Mostowfi Rural District. The following census in 2011 counted 9,039 people in 2,476 households. The 2016 census measured the population of the village as 7,150 people in 2,183 households, by which time the rural district had been transferred to the new Ahmadabad-e Mostowfi District. Shatareh was transferred to Bahramabad Rural District created in the Central District. It was the most populous village in its rural district.
