= Halilu =

Halilu هليلو
- Village
- Location within Iran
- Coordinates: 38°45′51″N 47°15′19″E
- Country: Iran
- Province: East Azerbaijan
- County: Ahar
- Bakhsh: Hurand
- Rural District: Dikleh

Population (2006)
  - Total: 163
- Time zone: UTC+3:30 (IRST)
  - Summer (DST): UTC+4:30 (IRDT)

For the deity see List of Ugaritic deities

Halilu (Persian: هليلو, also Romanized as Halīlū and Haliloo) is a village in Dikleh Rural District, Hurand District, Ahar County, East Azerbaijan Province, Iran. At the 2006 census, its population was 163, in 34 families.
