= Malekabad, Tehran =

Village in Tehran province, Iran

Malekabad Persian: ملك اباد
- Village
- Location within Iran
- Coordinates: 35°34′39″N 51°16′07″E
- Country: Iran
- Province: Tehran
- County: Eslamshahr
- District: Central
- Rural District: Bahramabad

Population (2016)
  - Total: 306
- Time zone: UTC+3:30 (IRST)

Malekabad (Persian: ملك اباد) (Note: Also romanized as Malekābād and Molkābād) is a village in Bahramabad Rural District of the Central District in Eslamshahr County, Tehran province, Iran.

== Demographics ==
=== Population ===
At the time of the 2006 National Census, the village's population was 319 in 106 households, when it was in Deh Abbas Rural District. The following census in 2011 counted 246 people in 76 households. The 2016 census measured the population of the village as 306 people in 161 households, by which time it had been transferred to Bahramabad Rural District created in the Central District.
