= Vieq =

Vieq ويق
- Village
- Location within Iran
- Coordinates: 38°53′42″N 47°26′19″E
- Country: Iran
- Province: East Azerbaijan
- County: Ahar
- Bakhsh: Hurand
- Rural District: Dodangeh

Population (2006)
  - Total: 31
- Time zone: UTC+3:30 (IRST)
  - Summer (DST): UTC+4:30 (IRDT)

Vieq (Persian: ويق, also Romanized as Vīeq; also known as Vīyeh) is a village in Dodangeh Rural District, Hurand District, Ahar County, East Azerbaijan Province, Iran. At the 2006 census, its population was 31, in 7 families.
