= Qotanlu =

Qotanlu قتانلو
- Village
- Location within Iran
- Coordinates: 38°50′36″N 47°30′40″E
- Country: Iran
- Province: East Azerbaijan
- County: Ahar
- Bakhsh: Hurand
- Rural District: Dodangeh

Population (2006)
  - Total: 177
- Time zone: UTC+3:30 (IRST)
  - Summer (DST): UTC+4:30 (IRDT)

Qotanlu (Persian: قتانلو, also Romanized as Qoţānlū) is a village in Dodangeh Rural District, Hurand District, Ahar County, East Azerbaijan Province, Iran. At the 2006 census, its population was 177, in 38 families.
