= Aliabad, Eslamshahr =

Village in Tehran province, Iran

Aliabad Persian: علي اباد
- Village
- Location within Iran
- Coordinates: 35°31′21″N 51°12′18″E
- Country: Iran
- Province: Tehran
- County: Eslamshahr
- District: Ahmadabad-e Mostowfi
- Rural District: Ahmadabad-e Mostowfi

Population (2016)
  - Total: 35
- Time zone: UTC+3:30 (IRST)

Aliabad (Persian: علي اباد) (Note: Also romanized as ‘Alīābād) is a village in Ahmadabad-e Mostowfi Rural District of Ahmadabad-e Mostowfi District in Eslamshahr County, Tehran province, Iran.

== Demographics ==
=== Population ===
At the time of the 2006 National Census, the village's population was 27 in six households, when it was in the Central District. The following census in 2011 had a population below the reporting threshold. The 2016 census measured the population of the village as 35 people in 10 households, by which time the rural district had been separated from the district in the formation of Ahmadabad-e Mostowfi District.
