= Aq Beraz =

Village in East Azerbaijan province, Iran

Aq Beraz Persian: اق براز
- Village
- Location within Iran
- Coordinates: 39°00′40″N 47°23′35″E
- Country: Iran
- Province: East Azerbaijan
- County: Hurand
- District: Chahardangeh
- Rural District: Chahardangeh-ye Shomali

Population (2016)
  - Total: 645
- Time zone: UTC+3:30 (IRST)

Aq Beraz (Persian: اق براز) (Note: Also romanized as Āq Berāz; also known as Āq Barār) is a village in Chahardangeh-ye Shomali Rural District (Note: Formerly Chahardangeh Rural District) of Chahardangeh District of Hurand County, East Azerbaijan province, Iran, serving as capital of both the district and the rural district.

== Demographics ==
=== Population ===
At the time of the 2006 National Census, the village's population was 740 in 142 households, when it was in Chahardangeh Rural District (Note: Renamed Chahardangeh-ye Shomali Rural District) of the former Hurand District in Ahar County. The following census in 2011 counted 754 people in 171 households. The 2016 census measured the population of the village as 645 people in 174 households.

In 2018, the district was separated from the county in the establishment of Hurand County. The rural district was transferred to the new Chahardangeh District and renamed Chahardangeh-ye Shomali Rural District.
