= Molk-e Daraq =

Molk-e Daraq ملك درق
- Village
- Location within Iran
- Coordinates: 38°58′44″N 47°19′58″E
- Country: Iran
- Province: East Azerbaijan
- County: Ahar
- Bakhsh: Hurand
- Rural District: Chahardangeh

Population (2006)
  - Total: 127
- Time zone: UTC+3:30 (IRST)
  - Summer (DST): UTC+4:30 (IRDT)

Molk-e Daraq (Persian: ملك درق) is a village in Chahardangeh Rural District, Hurand District, Ahar County, East Azerbaijan Province, Iran. At the 2006 census, its population was 127, in 23 families.
