= Chahardangeh Rural District =

Chahardangeh Rural District (Persian: دهستان چهاردانگه) may refer to several administrative divisions of Iran:

== Alborz province ==
- Chahardangeh Rural District (Chaharbagh County)

== East Azerbaijan province ==
- Chahardangeh Rural District (Hurand County), renamed Chahardangeh-ye Shomali Rural District
- Chahardangeh-ye Jonubi Rural District, Hurand County
- Chahardangeh-ye Shomali Rural District, Hurand County

== Mazandaran province ==
- Chahardangeh Rural District (Sari County)

== Tehran province ==
- Chahardangeh Rural District (Eslamshahr County)

== See also ==
- Chahardangeh District (disambiguation)
