= Delqanab =

Delqanab دلقناب
- Village
- Location within Iran
- Coordinates: 38°47′35″N 47°29′09″E
- Country: Iran
- Province: East Azerbaijan
- County: Ahar
- Bakhsh: Hurand
- Rural District: Dodangeh

Population (2006)
  - Total: 153
- Time zone: UTC+3:30 (IRST)
  - Summer (DST): UTC+4:30 (IRDT)

Delqanab (Persian: دلقناب, romanized: Delqanāb; also known as Delqānū) is a village in Dodangeh Rural District, Hurand District, Ahar County, East Azerbaijan Province, Iran. At the 2006 census, its population was 153, in 27 families.
