= Qayah Dibi =

Qayah Dibi قيه ديبي
- Village
- Location within Iran
- Coordinates: 39°01′15″N 47°22′09″E
- Country: Iran
- Province: East Azerbaijan
- County: Ahar
- Bakhsh: Hurand
- Rural District: Chahardangeh

Population (2006)
  - Total: 67
- Time zone: UTC+3:30 (IRST)
  - Summer (DST): UTC+4:30 (IRDT)

Qayah Dibi (Persian: قيه ديبي, also Romanized as Qayah Dībī; also known as Qayah Debī) is a village in Chahardangeh Rural District, Hurand District, Ahar County, East Azerbaijan Province, Iran. At the 2006 census, its population was 67, in 14 families.
