= Charmeh Dash =

Charmeh Dash چرمه داش
- Village
- Location within Iran
- Coordinates: 38°53′07″N 47°22′13″E
- Country: Iran
- Province: East Azerbaijan
- County: Ahar
- Bakhsh: Hurand
- Rural District: Dodangeh

Population (2006)
  - Total: 65
- Time zone: UTC+3:30 (IRST)
  - Summer (DST): UTC+4:30 (IRDT)

Charmeh Dash (Persian: چرمه داش, romanized: Charmeh Dāsh; also known as Charmdāsh) is a village in Dodangeh Rural District, Hurand District, Ahar County, East Azerbaijan Province, Iran. At the 2006 census, its population was 65, in 16 families.
