= Melkhas =

Melkhas ملخاص
- Village
- Location within Iran
- Coordinates: 38°46′16″N 47°26′01″E
- Country: Iran
- Province: East Azerbaijan
- County: Ahar
- Bakhsh: Hurand
- Rural District: Dodangeh

Population (2006)
  - Total: 62
- Time zone: UTC+3:30 (IRST)
  - Summer (DST): UTC+4:30 (IRDT)

Melkhas (Persian: ملخاص, also Romanized as Melkhāş and Melkhās) is a village in Dodangeh Rural District, Hurand District, Ahar County, East Azerbaijan Province, Iran. At the 2006 census, its population was 62, in 11 families.
