= Havay =

Village in East Azerbaijan province, Iran

Havay Persian: هواي
- Village
- Location within Iran
- Coordinates: 38°54′46″N 47°27′09″E
- Country: Iran
- Province: East Azerbaijan
- County: Hurand
- District: Central
- Rural District: Dodangeh

Population (2016)
  - Total: 677
- Time zone: UTC+3:30 (IRST)

Havay (Persian: هواي) (Note: Also romanized as Havāy and Hovāy; also known as Havā) is a village in Dodangeh Rural District of the Central District in Hurand County, East Azerbaijan province, Iran.

== Demographics ==
=== Population ===
At the time of the 2006 National Census, the village's population was 743 in 167 households, when it was in the former Hurand District of Ahar County. The following census in 2011 counted 656 people in 188 households. The 2016 census measured the population of the village as 677 people in 203 households.

In 2018, the district was separated from the county in the establishment of Hurand County, and the rural district was transferred to the new Central District.
