= Alchalu =

Alchalu الچالو
- Village
- Country: Iran
- Province: East Azerbaijan
- County: Ahar
- Bakhsh: Hurand
- Rural District: Chahardangeh

Population (2006)
  - Total: 28
- Time zone: UTC+3:30 (IRST)
  - Summer (DST): UTC+4:30 (IRDT)

Alchalu (Persian: الچالو, romanized: Ālchālū) is a village in Chahardangeh Rural District, Hurand District, Ahar County, East Azerbaijan Province, Iran. At the 2006 census, its population was 28, in 5 families.
