= Chichaklu, Tehran =

Village in Tehran province, Iran

Chichaklu Persian: چيچكلو
- Village

- Location within Iran
- Coordinates: 35°33′49″N 51°12′19″E
- Country: Iran
- Province: Tehran
- County: Eslamshahr
- District: Ahmadabad-e Mostowfi
- Rural District: Chichaklu

Population (2016)
  - Total: 2,656
- Time zone: UTC+3:30 (IRST)

Chichaklu (Persian: چيچكلو) (Note: Also romanized as Chīchaklū; also known as Cheklū and Chīchalū) is a village in, and the capital of, Chichaklu Rural District in Ahmadabad-e Mostowfi District of Eslamshahr County, Tehran province, Iran.

== Demographics ==
=== Population ===
At the time of the 2006 National Census, the village's population was 2,196 in 570 households, when it was in Deh Abbas Rural District of the Central District. The following census in 2011 counted 2,532 people in 709 households. The 2016 census measured the population of the village as 2,656 people in 782 households, by which time the village had been transferred to Chichaklu Rural District created in the new Ahmadabad-e Mostowfi District. It was the most populous village in its rural district.
