= Shaghlan =

Shaghlan شغالان
- Village
- Location within Iran
- Coordinates: 38°52′34″N 47°33′34″E
- Country: Iran
- Province: East Azerbaijan
- County: Ahar
- Bakhsh: Hurand
- Rural District: Dodangeh

Population (2006)
  - Total: 65
- Time zone: UTC+3:30 (IRST)
  - Summer (DST): UTC+4:30 (IRDT)

Shaghlan (Persian: شغالان, also Romanized as Shaghlān; also known as Shaqlān) is a village in Dodangeh Rural District, Hurand District, Ahar County, East Azerbaijan Province, Iran. At the 2006 census, its population was 65, in 14 families.
