= Khuy Suroq =

Khuy Suroq خوي سورق
- Village
- Location within Iran
- Coordinates: 38°57′03″N 47°21′53″E
- Country: Iran
- Province: East Azerbaijan
- County: Ahar
- Bakhsh: Hurand
- Rural District: Chahardangeh

Population (2006)
  - Total: 187
- Time zone: UTC+3:30 (IRST)
  - Summer (DST): UTC+4:30 (IRDT)

Khuy Suroq (Persian: خوي سورق, also Romanized as Khūy Sūroq; also known as Khūy Būrūq and Khvoy Sareh) is a village in Chahardangeh Rural District, Hurand District, Ahar County, East Azerbaijan Province, Iran. At the 2006 census, its population was 187, in 36 families.
