= Tombakuluq =

Tombakuluq تمباكولوق
- Village
- Location within Iran
- Coordinates: 38°57′41″N 47°16′48″E
- Country: Iran
- Province: East Azerbaijan
- County: Ahar
- Bakhsh: Hurand
- Rural District: Chahardangeh

Population (2006)
  - Total: 180
- Time zone: UTC+3:30 (IRST)
  - Summer (DST): UTC+4:30 (IRDT)

Tombakuluq (Persian: تمباكولوق, also Romanized as Tombākūlūq; also known as Tabkalakh, Tabkelekh, and Tombaklū) is a village in Chahardangeh Rural District, Hurand District, Ahar County, East Azerbaijan Province, Iran. At the 2006 census, its population was 180, in 36 families.
