= Lorum, Iran =

Village in East Azerbaijan province, Iran

Lorum Persian: لروم
- Village
- Location within Iran
- Coordinates: 38°45′08″N 47°17′53″E
- Country: Iran
- Province: East Azerbaijan
- County: Hurand
- District: Central
- Rural District: Dikleh

Population (2016)
  - Total: 250
- Time zone: UTC+3:30 (IRST)

Lorum (Persian: لروم) (Note: Also romanized as Lorūm) is a village in Dikleh Rural District of the Central District in Hurand County, East Azerbaijan province, Iran.

== Demographics ==
=== Population ===
At the time of the 2006 National Census, the village's population was 397 in 83 households, when it was in the former Hurand District of Ahar County. The following census in 2011 counted 302 people in 80 households. The 2016 census measured the population of the village as 250 people in 70 households.

In 2018, the district was separated from the county in the establishment of Hurand County, and the rural district was transferred to the new Central District.
