= Aznab-e Sofla, East Azerbaijan =

Village in East Azerbaijan province, Iran

Aznab-e Sofla Persian: ازناب سفلي
- Village
- Location within Iran
- Country: Iran
- Province: East Azerbaijan
- County: Hurand
- District: Chahardangeh
- Rural District: Chahardangeh-ye Shomali

Population (2016)
  - Total: 379
- Time zone: UTC+3:30 (IRST)

Aznab-e Sofla (Persian: ازناب سفلي) (Note: Also romanized as Aznāb-e Soflā) is a village in Chahardangeh-ye Shomali Rural District (Note: Formerly Chahardangeh Rural District) of Chahardangeh District of Hurand County, East Azerbaijan province, Iran.

== Demographics ==
=== Population ===
At the time of the 2006 National Census, the village's population was 395 in 85 households, when it was in Chahardangeh Rural District (Note: Renamed Chahardangeh-ye Shomali Rural District) of the former Hurand District in Ahar County. The following census in 2011 counted 451 people in 115 households. The 2016 census measured the population of the village as 379 people in 120 households.

In 2018, the district was separated from the county in the establishment of Hurand County. The rural district was transferred to the new Chahardangeh District and renamed Chahardangeh-ye Shomali Rural District.
