= Sangarabad, East Azerbaijan =

Sangarabad سنگراباد
- Village
- Location within Iran
- Coordinates: 38°43′27″N 47°17′44″E
- Country: Iran
- Province: East Azerbaijan
- County: Ahar
- Bakhsh: Hurand
- Rural District: Dikleh

Population (2006)
  - Total: 89
- Time zone: UTC+3:30 (IRST)
  - Summer (DST): UTC+4:30 (IRDT)

Sangarabad (Persian: سنگراباد, also Romanized as Sangarābād; also known as Sangar Āb) is a village in Dikleh Rural District, Hurand District, Ahar County, East Azerbaijan Province, Iran. At the 2006 census, its population was 89, in 17 families.
