= Loqman, East Azerbaijan =

Loqman لقمان
- Village
- Location within Iran
- Coordinates: 38°41′23″N 47°20′15″E
- Country: Iran
- Province: East Azerbaijan
- County: Ahar
- Bakhsh: Hurand
- Rural District: Dikleh

Population (2006)
  - Total: 147
- Time zone: UTC+3:30 (IRST)
  - Summer (DST): UTC+4:30 (IRDT)

Loqman (Persian: لقمان, also Romanized as Loqmān) is a village in Dikleh Rural District, Hurand District, Ahar County, East Azerbaijan Province, Iran. At the 2006 census, its population was 147, in 34 families.
