= Parijan =

Parijan پريجان
- Village
- Location within Iran
- Coordinates: 38°56′37″N 47°19′09″E
- Country: Iran
- Province: East Azerbaijan
- County: Ahar
- Bakhsh: Hurand
- Rural District: Dodangeh

Population (2006)
  - Total: 137
- Time zone: UTC+3:30 (IRST)
  - Summer (DST): UTC+4:30 (IRDT)

Parijan (Persian: پريجان, also Romanized as Parījān; also known as Barīḥān, Barījān, Bī Rīḩān, and Borīhān) is a village in Dodangeh Rural District, Hurand District, Ahar County, East Azerbaijan Province, Iran. At the 2006 census, its population was 137, in 29 families.
