= Ziarlu =

Ziarlu زيارلو
- Village
- Location within Iran
- Coordinates: 39°04′54″N 47°27′15″E
- Country: Iran
- Province: East Azerbaijan
- County: Ahar
- Bakhsh: Hurand
- Rural District: Chahardangeh

Population (2006)
  - Total: 190
- Time zone: UTC+3:30 (IRST)
  - Summer (DST): UTC+4:30 (IRDT)

Ziarlu (Persian: زيارلو, also Romanized as Zīārlū) is a village in Chahardangeh Rural District, Hurand District, Ahar County, East Azerbaijan Province, Iran. At the 2006 census, its population was 190, in 33 families.
