= Irin, Iran =

Village in Tehran province, Iran

Chichaklu Persian: ايرين
- Village
- Location within Iran
- Coordinates: 35°34′41″N 51°12′46″E
- Country: Iran
- Province: Tehran
- County: Eslamshahr
- District: Ahmadabad-e Mostowfi
- Rural District: Chichaklu

Population (2016)
  - Total: 1,822
- Time zone: UTC+3:30 (IRST)

Irin (Persian: ايرين) (Note: Also romanized as Īrīn; also known as Abrīn and Īrman) is a village in Chichaklu Rural District of Ahmadabad-e Mostowfi District in Eslamshahr County, Tehran province, Iran.

== Demographics ==
=== Population ===
At the time of the 2006 National Census, the village's population was 1,859 in 457 households, when it was in Deh Abbas Rural District of the Central District. The following census in 2011 counted 1,936 people in 542 households. The 2016 census measured the population of the village as 1,822 people in 556 households, by which time the village had been transferred to Chichaklu Rural District created in the new Ahmadabad-e Mostowfi District.
