= Raziabad, Tehran =

Village in Tehran province, Iran

Raziabad Persian: رضي اباد
- Village
- Location within Iran
- Coordinates: 35°36′19″N 51°12′17″E
- Country: Iran
- Province: Tehran
- County: Eslamshahr
- District: Ahmadabad-e Mostowfi
- Rural District: Ahmadabad-e Mostowfi

Population (2016)
  - Total: 292
- Time zone: UTC+3:30 (IRST)

Raziabad (Persian: رضي اباد) (Note: Also romanized as Raẕīābād; also known as Raẕīābād Ḩarīrī) is a village in Ahmadabad-e Mostowfi Rural District of Ahmadabad-e Mostowfi District in Eslamshahr County, Tehran province, Iran.

== Demographics ==
=== Population ===
At the time of the 2006 National Census, the village's population was 561 in 134 households, when it was in the Central District. The following census in 2011 counted 298 people in 72 households. The 2016 census measured the population of the village as 292 people in 105 households, by which time the rural district had been separated from the district in the formation of Ahmadabad-e Mostowfi District.
