= Gurom Daraq =

Gurom Daraq گورم درق
- Village
- Location within Iran
- Coordinates: 38°58′06″N 47°22′11″E
- Country: Iran
- Province: East Azerbaijan
- County: Ahar
- Bakhsh: Hurand
- Rural District: Chahardangeh

Population (2006)
  - Total: 27
- Time zone: UTC+3:30 (IRST)
  - Summer (DST): UTC+4:30 (IRDT)

Gurom Daraq (Persian: گورم درق, also Romanized as Gūrom Daraq; also known as Gorom Darreh) is a village in Chahardangeh Rural District, Hurand District, Ahar County, East Azerbaijan Province, Iran. At the 2006 census, its population was 27, in 6 families.
