= Niq =

Niq نيق
- Village
- Location within Iran
- Coordinates: 38°49′03″N 47°18′43″E
- Country: Iran
- Province: East Azerbaijan
- County: Ahar
- Bakhsh: Hurand
- Rural District: Dodangeh

Population (2006)
  - Total: 264
- Time zone: UTC+3:30 (IRST)
  - Summer (DST): UTC+4:30 (IRDT)

Niq (Persian: نيق, also Romanized as Nīq and Neyaq; also known as Nīāk) is a village in Dodangeh Rural District, Hurand District, Ahar County, East Azerbaijan Province, Iran. At the 2006 census, its population was 264, in 59 families.
