= Aydinlu, East Azerbaijan =

Aydinlu ايدين لو
- Village
- Location within Iran
- Coordinates: 38°39′58″N 47°18′53″E
- Country: Iran
- Province: East Azerbaijan
- County: Ahar
- Bakhsh: Hurand
- Rural District: Dikleh

Population (2006)
  - Total: 202
- Time zone: UTC+3:30 (IRST)
  - Summer (DST): UTC+4:30 (IRDT)

Aydinlu (Persian: ايدين لو, also Romanized as Āydīnlū) is a village in Dikleh Rural District, Hurand District, Ahar County, East Azerbaijan Province, Iran. At the 2006 census, its population was 202, in 40 families.
