= Hasanabad-e Khaleseh =

Village in Tehran province, Iran

Hasanabad-e Khaleseh Persian: حسن اباد خالصه
- Village
- Location within Iran
- Coordinates: 35°37′08″N 51°11′46″E
- Country: Iran
- Province: Tehran
- County: Eslamshahr
- District: Ahmadabad-e Mostowfi
- Rural District: Ahmadabad-e Mostowfi

Population (2016)
  - Total: 3,568
- Time zone: UTC+3:30 (IRST)

Hasanabad-e Khaleseh (Persian: حسن اباد خالصه) (Note: Also romanized as Ḩasanābād-e Khāleşeh; also known as Ḩasanābād) is a village in Ahmadabad-e Mostowfi Rural District of Ahmadabad-e Mostowfi District in Eslamshahr County, Tehran province, Iran.

== Demographics ==
=== Population ===
At the time of the 2006 National Census, the village's population was 2,108 in 542 households, when it was in the Central District. The following census in 2011 counted 4,179 people in 847 households. The 2016 census measured the population of the village as 3,568 people in 817 households, by which time the rural district had been separated from the district in the formation of Ahmadabad-e Mostowfi District. It was the most populous village in its rural district.
