= Azizlu, East Azerbaijan =

Azizlu عزيزلو
- Village
- Location within Iran
- Coordinates: 39°08′41″N 47°43′50″E
- Country: Iran
- Province: East Azerbaijan
- County: Ahar
- Bakhsh: Hurand
- Rural District: Chahardangeh

Population (2006)
  - Total: 185
- Time zone: UTC+3:30 (IRST)
  - Summer (DST): UTC+4:30 (IRDT)

Azizlu (Persian: عزيزلو, romanized: Azīzlū; also known as ‘Azīzollāh and ‘Azīzollāh Qeshlāq) is a village in Chahardangeh Rural District, Hurand District, Ahar County, East Azerbaijan Province, Iran. At the 2006 census, its population was 185, in 29 families.
