= Nezamabad, Tehran =

Village in Tehran province, Iran

Nezamabad Persian: نظام اباد
- Village
- Location within Iran
- Coordinates: 35°32′01″N 51°16′37″E
- Country: Iran
- Province: Tehran
- County: Eslamshahr
- District: Central
- Rural District: Deh Abbas

Population (2016)
  - Total: 1,061
- Time zone: UTC+3:30 (IRST)

Nezamabad (Persian: نظام اباد) (Note: Also romanized as Nez̧āmābād) is a village in Deh Abbas Rural District of the Central District in Eslamshahr County, Tehran province, Iran.

== Demographics ==
=== Population ===
At the time of the 2006 National Census, the village's population was 1,116 in 295 households. The following census in 2011 counted 861 people in 234 households. The 2016 census measured the population of the village as 1,061 people in 305 households.
