= Karak, Iran =

Karak or Kork or Kark (Persian: كرك) in Iran may refer to:

- Karak, Hamadan, village in Hamadan Province
- Kork, Kerman, village in Kerman Province
- Korak, Semnan, village in Semnan Province
- Karak-e Inkacheh, village in Tehran Province
- Simun, Iran, a.k.a. Karak, village in Tehran Province
