= Veravjen-e Sofla =

Veravjen-e Sofla وروجن سفلي
- Village
- Location within Iran
- Coordinates: 39°00′47″N 47°24′41″E
- Country: Iran
- Province: East Azerbaijan
- County: Ahar
- Bakhsh: Hurand
- Rural District: Chahardangeh

Population (2006)
  - Total: 180
- Time zone: UTC+3:30 (IRST)
  - Summer (DST): UTC+4:30 (IRDT)

Veravjen-e Sofla (Persian: وروجن سفلي, also Romanized as Veravjen-e Soflá; also known as Vīrāvjen) is a village in Chahardangeh Rural District, Hurand District, Ahar County, East Azerbaijan Province, Iran. At the 2006 census, its population was 180, in 36 families.
