= Davudlu, Iran =

Davudlu داودلو
- Village
- Location within Iran
- Coordinates: 38°58′29″N 47°19′00″E
- Country: Iran
- Province: East Azerbaijan
- County: Ahar
- Bakhsh: Hurand
- Rural District: Chahardangeh

Population (2006)
  - Total: 44
- Time zone: UTC+3:30 (IRST)
  - Summer (DST): UTC+4:30 (IRDT)

Davudlu (Persian: داودلو, also Romanized as Dāvūdlū) is a village in Chahardangeh Rural District, Hurand District, Ahar County, East Azerbaijan Province, Iran. At the 2006 census, its population was 44, in 9 families.
