= Firuz Bahram =

Firuz Bahram (Persian: فيروز بَهرام) may refer to:

- Firuzbahram
- Firuzbahram Rural District
- Firuz Bahram High School
