= Aznab-e Olya, East Azerbaijan =

Aznab-e Olya ازناب عليا
- Village
- Location within Iran
- Coordinates: 39°02′57″N 47°26′05″E
- Country: Iran
- Province: East Azerbaijan
- County: Ahar
- Bakhsh: Hurand
- Rural District: Chahardangeh

Population (2006)
  - Total: 220
- Time zone: UTC+3:30 (IRST)
  - Summer (DST): UTC+4:30 (IRDT)

Aznab-e Olya (Persian: ازناب عليا, also Romanized as Aznāb-e ‘Olyā; also known as Aznavī-ye Bālā) is a village in Chahardangeh Rural District, Hurand District, Ahar County, East Azerbaijan Province, Iran. At the 2006 census, its population was 220, in 43 families.
