= Chahardangeh District =

Chahardangeh District may refer to several administrative divisions of Iran:

- Chahardangeh District (Hurand County), East Azerbaijan province
- Chahardangeh District (Sari County), Mazandaran province
- Chahardangeh District (Eslamshahr County), Tehran province

== See also ==
- Chahardangeh Rural District (disambiguation)
