= Veravjen =

Veravjen (Persian: وروجن), also rendered as Viravjen, may refer to:

- Veravjen-e Olya
- Veravjen-e Sofla
