= Menjab-e Qadim =

Menjab-e Qadim منجاب قديم
- Village
- Location within Iran
- Coordinates: 38°54′22″N 47°19′51″E
- Country: Iran
- Province: East Azerbaijan
- County: Ahar
- Bakhsh: Hurand
- Rural District: Dodangeh

Population (2006)
  - Total: 144
- Time zone: UTC+3:30 (IRST)
  - Summer (DST): UTC+4:30 (IRDT)

Menjab-e Qadim (Persian: منجاب قديم, also romanized as Menjāb-e Qadīm and Manjāb-e Qadīm; also known as Menjāb and Menjāv-e Qadīm) is a village in Dodangeh Rural District, Hurand District, Ahar County, East Azerbaijan Province, Iran. At the 2006 census, its population was 144, in 38 families.
