= Aydinlu =

Aydinlu (Persian: ايدينلو) may refer to:

- Aydinlu, East Azerbaijan
- Aydinlu, West Azerbaijan
