= Aliabad-e Tapancheh =

Village in Tehran province, Iran

Aliabad-e Tapancheh Persian: علي اباد طپانچه
- Village
- Location within Iran
- Coordinates: 35°31′22″N 51°12′16″E
- Country: Iran
- Province: Tehran
- County: Eslamshahr
- District: Central
- Rural District: Deh Abbas

Population (2016)
  - Total: 1,259
- Time zone: UTC+3:30 (IRST)

Aliabad-e Tapancheh (Persian: علي ابادطپانچه) (Note: Also romanized as Alīābād-e Ţapāncheh) is a village in Deh Abbas Rural District of the Central District in Eslamshahr County, Tehran province, Iran.

== Demographics ==
=== Population ===
At the time of the 2006 National Census, the village's population was 4,562 in 1,094 households. The following census in 2011 counted 1,363 people in 363 households. The 2016 census measured the population of the village as 1,259 people in 352 households.
