= Menjab =

Menjab or Manjab (Persian: منجاب), also rendered as Menjav, may refer to:

- Menjab-e Jadid
- Menjab-e Qadim
