= Khalifehlu, Ahar =

Khalifehlu خليفه لو
- Village
- Location within Iran
- Coordinates: 38°40′38″N 47°16′00″E
- Country: Iran
- Province: East Azerbaijan
- County: Ahar
- Bakhsh: Hurand
- Rural District: Dikleh

Population (2006)
  - Total: 105
- Time zone: UTC+3:30 (IRST)
  - Summer (DST): UTC+4:30 (IRDT)

Khalifehlu (Persian: خليفه لو, also Romanized as Khalīfehlū and Khalifehloo; also known as Khalaf ‘Alī and Khalaflū) is a village in Dikleh Rural District, Hurand District, Ahar County, East Azerbaijan Province, Iran. At the 2006 census, its population was 105, in 20 families.
