= Menjab-e Jadid =

Menjab-e Jadid منجاب جديد
- Village
- Location within Iran
- Coordinates: 38°54′51″N 47°21′24″E
- Country: Iran
- Province: East Azerbaijan
- County: Ahar
- Bakhsh: Hurand
- Rural District: Dodangeh

Population (2006)
  - Total: 50
- Time zone: UTC+3:30 (IRST)
  - Summer (DST): UTC+4:30 (IRDT)

Menjab-e Jadid (Persian: منجاب جديد, also romanized as Menjāb-e Jadīd; also known as Menjāv-e Jadīd) is a village in Dodangeh Rural District, Hurand District, Ahar County, East Azerbaijan Province, Iran. At the 2006 census, its population was 50, in 12 families.
