= Chichaklu Rural District =

Rural district in Tehran province, Iran

Chichaklu Rural District Persian: دهستان چيچکلو
- Rural District
- Location within Iran
- Coordinates: 35°35′N 51°12′E
- Country: Iran
- Province: Tehran
- County: Eslamshahr
- District: Ahmadabad-e Mostowfi
- Established: 2012
- Capital: Chichaklu

Population (2016)
  - Total: 4,624
- Time zone: UTC+3:30 (IRST)

Chichaklu Rural District (Persian: دهستان چيچکلو) is in Ahmadabad-e Mostowfi District of Eslamshahr County, Tehran province, Iran. Its capital is the village of Chichaklu.

== History ==
In 2012, Ahmadabad-e Mostowfi Rural District was separated from the Central District in the formation of Ahmadabad-e Mostowfi District, and Chichaklu Rural District was created in the new district.

== Demographics ==
=== Population ===
At the time of the 2016 National Census, the rural district's population was 4,624 in 1,379 households. The most populous of its three villages was Chichaklu, with 2,656 people.

=== Other villages in the rural district ===
- Bahmanabad
- Irin
