= Shamsabad, Eslamshahr =

Village in Tehran province, Iran

Shamsabad Persian: شمس اباد
- Village
- Location within Iran
- Coordinates: 35°37′24″N 51°16′21″E
- Country: Iran
- Province: Tehran
- County: Eslamshahr
- District: Chahardangeh
- Rural District: Firuzbahram

Population (2016)
  - Total: 235
- Time zone: UTC+3:30 (IRST)

Shamsabad (Persian: شمس اباد) (Note: Also romanized as Shamsābād) is a village in Firuzbahram Rural District of Chahardangeh District in Eslamshahr County, Tehran province, Iran.

== Demographics ==
=== Population ===
At the time of the 2006 National Census, the village's population was 392 in 85 households. The following census in 2011 counted 60 people in 16 households. The 2016 census measured the population of the village as 235 people in 64 households.
