= Hoseynabad-e Siahab =

Village in Tehran province, Iran

Hoseynabad-e Siahab Persian: حسين ابادسياه اب
- Village
- Location within Iran
- Coordinates: 35°33′33″N 51°15′22″E
- Country: Iran
- Province: Tehran
- County: Eslamshahr
- District: Central
- Rural District: Deh Abbas

Population (2016)
  - Total: 61
- Time zone: UTC+3:30 (IRST)

Hoseynabad-e Siahab (Persian: حسين ابادسياه اب) (Note: Also romanized as Ḩoseynābād-e Sīāhāb; also known as Ḩoseynābād-e Seyāb and Ḩoseynābād-e Sīāb) is a village in Deh Abbas Rural District of the Central District in Eslamshahr County, Tehran province, Iran.

== Demographics ==
=== Population ===
At the time of the 2006 National Census, the village's population was 69 in 17 households. The following census in 2011 counted 62 people in 15 households. The 2016 census measured the population of the village as 61 people in 19 households.
