= Torshanbeh =

Village in Tehran province, Iran

Torshanbeh Persian: ترشنبه
- Village
- Location within Iran
- Coordinates: 35°35′50″N 51°15′29″E
- Country: Iran
- Province: Tehran
- County: Eslamshahr
- District: Chahardangeh
- Rural District: Firuzbahram

Population (2016)
  - Total: 90
- Time zone: UTC+3:30 (IRST)

Torshanbeh (Persian: ترشنبه) is a village in Firuzbahram Rural District of Chahardangeh District in Eslamshahr County, Tehran province, Iran.

== Demographics ==
=== Population ===
At the time of the 2006 National Census, the village's population was 100 in 30 households. The following census in 2011 counted 36 people in 11 households. The 2016 census measured the population of the village as 90 people in 27 households.
