= Bahramabad, Tehran =

Village in Tehran province, Iran

Bahramabad Persian: بهرام اباد
- Village
- Location within Iran
- Coordinates: 35°34′18″N 51°15′35″E
- Country: Iran
- Province: Tehran
- County: Eslamshahr
- District: Central
- Rural District: Bahramabad

Population (2016)
  - Total: 1,889
- Time zone: UTC+3:30 (IRST)

Bahramabad (Persian: بهرام اباد) (Note: Also romanized as Bahrāmābād) is a village in, and the capital of, Bahramabad Rural District in the Central District of Eslamshahr County, Tehran province, Iran.

== Demographics ==
=== Population ===
At the time of the 2006 National Census, the village's population was 1,770 in 407 households, when it was in Deh Abbas Rural District. The following census in 2011 counted 1,753 people in 457 households. The 2016 census measured the population of the village as 1,889 people in 566 households, by which time the village had been transferred to Bahramabad Rural District created in the Central District.
