= Karkas =

Karkas may refer to:

- Karkas Mountains, mountain range of Iran
- Karkas, Iran, a village in Iran
- Karkas Rural District, in Iran
- Karkas (comics), a fictional Marvel Comics character
- Monastery of Al-Karkas, monastery of Egypt
