= Sherbit Castle =

Castle in East Azerbaijan Province, Iran

- قلعه شربیت

General information
- Type: Castle
- Location: Ahar County, Iran

Sherbit Castle (Persian: قلعه شربیت) is a historical castle located in Ahar County in East Azerbaijan Province. The longevity of this fortress dates back to the Parthian Empire.
