= Aliabad-e Qajar =

Village in Tehran province, Iran

Aliabad-e Qajar Persian: علي آباد قاجار
- Village
- Location within Iran
- Coordinates: 35°36′38″N 51°19′50″E
- Country: Iran
- Province: Tehran
- County: Eslamshahr
- District: Chahardangeh
- Rural District: Chahardangeh

Population (2016)
  - Total: 1,607
- Time zone: UTC+3:30 (IRST)

Aliabad-e Qajar (Persian: علي آباد قاجار) is a village in Chahardangeh Rural District of Chahardangeh District of Eslamshahr County, Tehran province, Iran.

== Demographics ==
=== Population ===
The village did not appear in the 2006 and 2011 National Censuses. At the time of the 2016 census, the village's population was 1,607 people in 469 households. It was the only populated village of the two in its rural district; Khomarabad registered a population of zero.
