= Gol Dasteh, Tehran =

Village in Tehran province, Iran

Gol Dasteh Persian: گلدسته
- Village
- Location within Iran
- Country: Iran
- Province: Tehran
- County: Eslamshahr
- District: Chahardangeh
- Rural District: Firuzbahram

Population (2016)
  - Total: 7,602
- Time zone: UTC+3:30 (IRST)

Gol Dasteh (Persian: گلدسته) (Note: Also known as Shahrak-e Goldasteh) is a village in Firuzbahram Rural District of Chahardangeh District in Eslamshahr County, Tehran province, Iran.

== Demographics ==
=== Population ===
At the time of the 2006 National Census, the village's population was 8,537 in 2,175 households. The following census in 2011 counted 9,904 people in 2,727 households. The 2016 census measured the population of the village as 7,602 people in 2,594 households. It was the most populous village in its rural district.
