= Hoseynabad, Eslamshahr =

Village in Tehran province, Iran

Hoseynabad Persian: حسين آباد
- Village
- Location within Iran
- Coordinates: 35°31′37″N 51°15′29″E
- Country: Iran
- Province: Tehran
- County: Eslamshahr
- District: Central
- Rural District: Deh Abbas

Population (2016)
  - Total: 3,899
- Time zone: UTC+3:30 (IRST)

Hoseynabad (Persian: حسين آباد) is a village in Deh Abbas Rural District of the Central District of Eslamshahr County, Tehran province, Iran.

== Demographics ==
=== Population ===
At the time of the 2011 National Census, the village's population was 3,748 people in 966 households. The 2016 census measured the population of the village as 3,899 people in 1,075 households. It was the most populous village in its rural district.
