= Aznab-e Olya =

Aznab-e Olya (Persian: ازناب عليا) may refer to:

- Aznab-e Olya, East Azerbaijan
- Aznab-e Olya, Kermanshah
