= Simun, Iran =

Village in Tehran province, Iran

Simun Persian: سيمون
- Village
- Location within Iran
- Coordinates: 35°32′58″N 51°17′23″E
- Country: Iran
- Province: Tehran
- County: Eslamshahr
- District: Central
- Rural District: Deh Abbas

Population (2016)
  - Total: 222
- Time zone: UTC+3:30 (IRST)

Simun (Persian: سيمون) (Note: Also romanized as Sīmūn; also known as Karak) is a village in Deh Abbas Rural District of the Central District in Eslamshahr County, Tehran province, Iran.

== Demographics ==
=== Population ===
At the time of the 2006 National Census, the village's population was 211 in 48 households. The following census in 2011 counted 150 people in 37 households. The 2016 census measured the population of the village as 222 people in 63 households.
