= Azizlu =

Azizlu may refer to:

- Azizlu, Armenia
- Azizlu, Ardabil, Iran
- Azizlu, East Azerbaijan, Iran
- Azizlu, Zanjan, Iran
