= Mahdi Ganjzadeh =

Iranian karateka (born 2003)

Personal information
- Nationality: Iranian
- Born: 11 June 2003 (age 23) Eslamshahr, Tehran Province, Iran
- Education: Islamshahr Azad University

Sport
- Sport: Karate
- Event: Kumite
- Club: Black belt
Medal record
Representing Iran
Men's Karate
Asian Karate Championships
Silver medal – second place	Almaty 2023	U21
Bronze medal – third place	Hangzhou 2024	Senior team kumite
Silver medal – second place	Bali 2026	Team kumite
Karate1 Premier League
Gold medal – first place	Fujairah 2024	U21
Karate World Championships
Silver medal – second place	Spain 2024	Senior team kumite
Baku Open
Bronze medal – third place	Baku 2019	Kumite
|}

Mahdi Ganjzadeh (born 11 June 2003 in Eslamshahr, Iran) is an Iranian karateka.

He won a gold medal at the Fujairah competition in 2024.

== Achievements ==
In 2023, Ganjzadeh won a Silver silver medal at the competition in Kazakhstan.

In 2024, Ganjzadeh won a Gold gold medal in the under-21 competition in Fujairah, United Arab Emirates, as part of the Karate1 circuit.

In 2024, Ganjzadeh won a Silver silver medal at the Karate World Championships in Spain.

Ganjzadeh won the Silver silver medal in the senior men's team kumite event at the 2026 Asian Karate Championships in Bali, Indonesia.

== Biography ==
Ganjzadeh grew up in Eslamshahr, Tehran Province, and began practicing karate at the age of five. His first coach was Mousa Ganjzadeh. He competed in local, provincial, and national competitions in both youth and senior categories and eventually joined the Iran national karate team.

Ganjzadeh represented Iran in various competitions in 2019, 2023, 2024, 2025, and 2026, winning medals during this period. His family is originally from Moghan County in Ardabil Province.
