= Hava =

Hava or HAVA may refer to:

- Hava, Iran, a village in East Azerbaijan Province, Iran
- Helmand and Arghandab Valley Authority, an economic development agency of the Afghan government
- Help America Vote Act, a United States election law
- Monsoon HAVA, a video streaming device
- Hava or Chava, Hebrew version of the name Eve
- Hava (musician), German rapper and singer
- Hava SOJ, Turkish electronic warfare aircraft
