= Khoda Qoli =

Khoda Qoli (Persian: خداقلي) may refer to:

- Khoda Qoli, East Azerbaijan
- Khoda Qoli, North Khorasan
