= Tubin =

Tubin may refer to:

- Eduard Tubin (1905–1982), Estonian composer
- Elfriede Tubin (1916–1983), Estonian dancer and actress, and wife of Eduard Tubin
- Tubin, Iran, a village in East Azerbaijan Province, Iran
