= Kark =

Kark or Karak (Persian: كرك) may refer to:

- Kark, Iran (disambiguation)
- Kark (Hindu astrology), a Hindu zodiac sign

== People with the surname ==
- Austen Kark (1926–2002), British broadcaster
- Feliks Kark (born 1933), Estonian actor and caricaturist
- Friedrich Kark (1869–1939), German conductor
- Gert Kark, Estonian television producer
- Jeremy David Kark (1943–2018), South African-Israeli epidemiologist
- Karl Kark (1884–1924), Estonian engineer and politician
- Ruth Kark (born 1941), Israeli historical geographer
- Tõnu Kark (born 1947), Estonian actor

== See also ==
- KARK-TV, an American television station
