= Lorum =

Lorum may refer to:

- Lorum (card game), a Hungarian card game
- Lorum (piercing)
- Lorum, Iran, a village in Iran
- Lorum, County Carlow, a village in County Carlow, Ireland
