= Aznab-e Khaleseh =

Aznab-e Khaleseh ازنابخالصه
- Village
- Location within Iran
- Coordinates: 39°03′05″N 47°27′42″E
- Country: Iran
- Province: East Azerbaijan
- County: Ahar
- Bakhsh: Hurand
- Rural District: Chahardangeh

Population (2006)
  - Total: 178
- Time zone: UTC+3:30 (IRST)
  - Summer (DST): UTC+4:30 (IRDT)

Aznab-e Khaleseh (Persian: ازنابخالصه, romanized: Aznāb-e Khāleşeh; also known as Shekarlū Khāleşeh) is a village in Chahardangeh Rural District, Hurand District, Ahar County, East Azerbaijan Province, Iran. At the 2006 census, its population was 178, in 35 families.
