= Qaleh Kandi =

Qaleh Kandi (Persian: قلعه كندي) may refer to:

- Qaleh Kandi, Ahar
- Qaleh Kandi, Kaleybar
