= Kerek =

Kerek may refer to:

- Kereks, an ethnic group of people in Russia
- Kerek language
- Angela Kerek, a German tennis player
- Kerek, Markazi, a village in Markazi Province
- Kerek, Tehran, a village in Tehran Province
