= Ahmadabad Rural District =

Ahmadabad Rural District (Persian: دهستان احمدآباد) may refer to:

- Ahmadabad Rural District (Nazarabad County), Alborz province
- Ahmadabad Rural District (Eqlid County), Fars province
- Ahmadabad Rural District (Firuzabad County), Fars province
- Ahmadabad Rural District (Takab County), West Azerbaijan province

== See also ==
- Ahmadabad-e Mostowfi Rural District
