= Aznab-e Sofla =

Aznab-e Sofla (Persian: ازناب سفلي) may refer to:

- Aznab-e Sofla, East Azerbaijan
- Aznab-e Sofla, Kermanshah
