= Shekarlui =

Shekarlui (Persian: شكرلوي), also rendered as Shekarlu or Shokorlu, may refer to:

- Shekarlui-ye Olya

== See also ==
- Shekarlu Khaleseh
