= Irin =

Irin or IRIN may refer to:

- Irin, Iran, a village in Tehran Province
- Integrated Regional Information Networks, now The New Humanitarian, an independent, non-profit news agency
- Islamic Republic of Iran Navy
- Watcher (angel), Aramaic irin in the Books of Enoch
