= Deh Abbas, Tehran =

Village in Tehran province, Iran

Deh Abbas Persian: ده عباس
- Village
- Location within Iran
- Coordinates: 35°33′41″N 51°16′47″E
- Country: Iran
- Province: Tehran
- County: Eslamshahr
- District: Central
- Rural District: Deh Abbas

Population (2016)
  - Total: 958
- Time zone: UTC+3:30 (IRST)

Deh Abbas (Persian: ده عباس) (Note: Also romanized as Deh ‘Abbās and Deh-e ‘Abbās; also known as Den ‘Abbās) is a village in, and the capital of, Deh Abbas Rural District in the Central District of Eslamshahr County, Tehran province, Iran.

== Demographics ==
=== Population ===
At the time of the 2006 National Census, the village's population was 917 in 238 households. The following census in 2011 counted 906 people in 251 households. The 2016 census measured the population of the village as 958 people in 285 households.
