= Firuzbahram =

Village in Tehran province, Iran

Firuzbahram Persian: فيروزبهرام
- Village
- Location within Iran
- Coordinates: 35°37′41″N 51°14′58″E
- Country: Iran
- Province: Tehran
- County: Eslamshahr
- District: Chahardangeh
- Rural District: Firuzbahram

Population (2016)
  - Total: 1,103
- Time zone: UTC+3:30 (IRST)

Firuzbahram (Persian: فيروزبهرام) (Note: Also romanized as Fīrūz Bahrām and Fīrūzbahrām) is a village in, and the capital of, Firuzbahram Rural District in Chahardangeh District of Eslamshahr County, Tehran province, Iran.

== Demographics ==
=== Population ===
At the time of the 2006 National Census, the village's population was 1,841 in 487 households. The following census in 2011 counted 1,480 people in 426 households. The 2016 census measured the population of the village as 1,103 people in 356 households.
