= Khalaf Ali =

Khalaf Ali (Persian: خلف علی) may refer to:

- Khalaf Ali, Ardabil
- Khalaf Ali, East Azerbaijan
- Khalaf Ali, Zanjan
