= Eslamshahr =

City in Tehran province, Iran

Shadshahr Persian: شادشهر
- City
- Eslamshahr
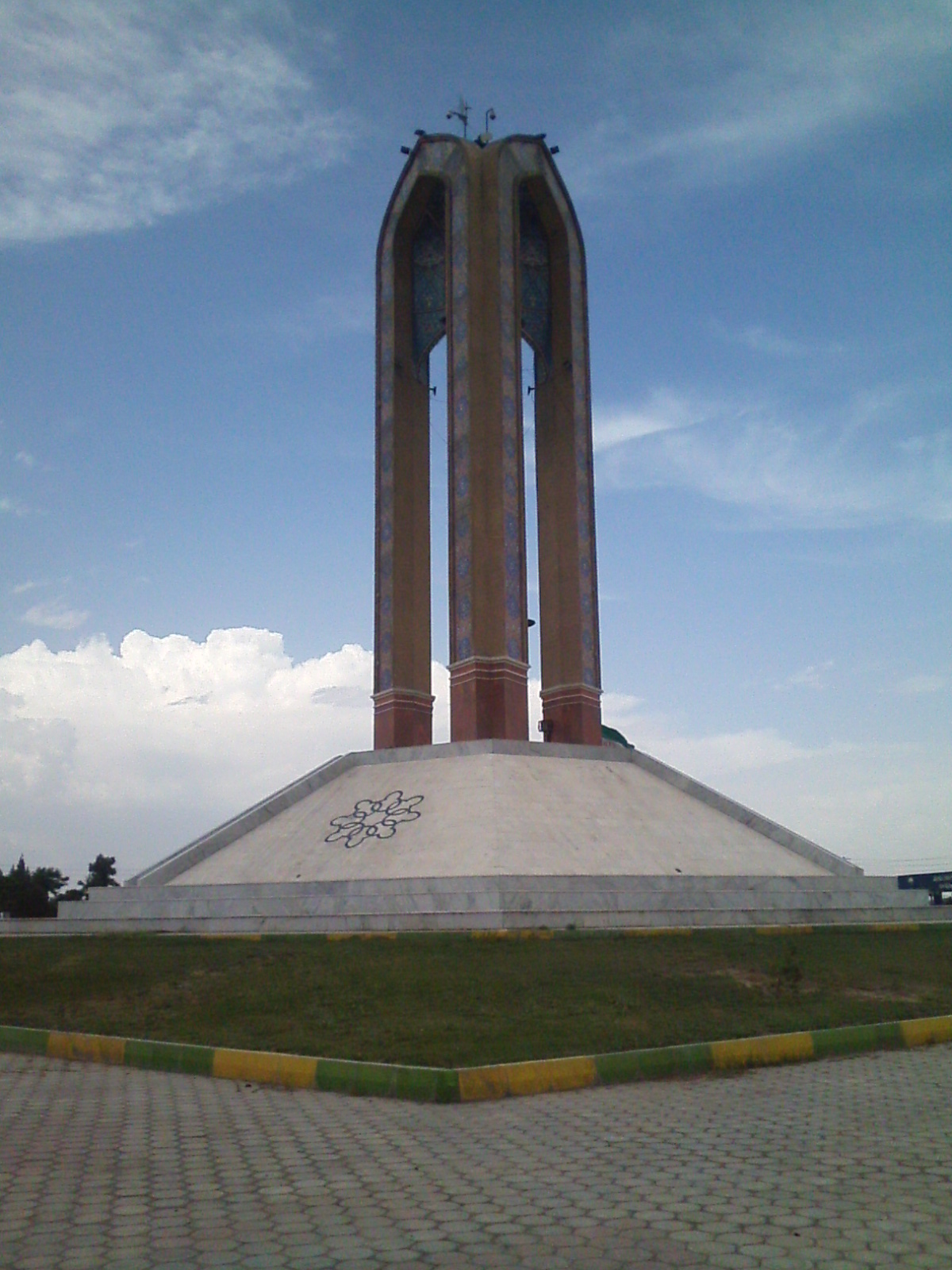

- Location within Iran
- Coordinates: 35°32′19″N 51°13′22″E
- Country: Iran
- Province: Tehran
- County: Eslamshahr
- District: Central

Population (2016)
  - Total: 448,129
- Time zone: UTC+3:30 (IRST)
- Website: www.eslamshahr.ir

Eslamshahr (Persian: اسلامشهر (Note: Also romanized as Eslāmshahr)), also known as Shadshahr (Persian: شادشهر), is a city in the Central District of Eslamshahr County, Tehran province, Iran. It is the capital of both the county and the district.

== Etymology ==
The name of Eslamshahr before the Iranian Revolution was "Shadshahr". After the revolution, in 1979 the government changed the name to "Eslamshahr." The oldest historic name of Shadshahr was Bahramabad, now applied only to the small northern suburbs of Eslamshahr, or the village of Bahramabad.

== Demographics ==
=== Population ===
At the time of the 2006 National Census, the city's population was 357,171 in 91,293 households. The following census in 2011 counted 389,102 people in 112,487 households. The 2016 census measured the population of the city as 448,129 people in 137,638 households.

The city has grown to be the most populous non-provincial capital city and the 19th overall most populous city of the country.

== Geography ==
The city is located on the Saveh Road, which starts in the south of Tehran, and ends at Saveh City. Its neighborhoods are Vavan, Ghaemieh, Saeedieh, Mohamadieh, Mahdieh, Baghenarde, Saloor, Noori, Ghasemabad, Shirudi, Golha, Elahiye, Ahmadabad, Ghods, Baghqfeiz, Zarafshan, Moosiabad, Anbia and Mianabad.

== History ==
From January 17 to 18, 2026, as part of the 2025–2026 Iranian protests, youths attacked the local Ghaemiyeh police station.

An airstrike struck a residential building in the city on April 6, 2026, during the 2026 Iran war, killing at least 13 people.

== Climate ==
Eslamshahr has a cold semi-arid climate (Köppen BSk). The highest recorded temperature was 43 °C (109 °F), recorded on July 10, 1990, while the lowest recorded temperature was −13 °C (9 °F), recorded on January 2, 1973.

Climate data for Eslamshahr
Month	Jan	Feb	Mar	Apr	May	Jun	Jul	Aug	Sep	Oct	Nov	Dec	Year
Record high °C (°F)	19 (66)	23 (73)	29 (84)	33 (91)	38 (100)	41 (106)	43 (109)	42 (108)	39 (102)	33 (91)	27 (81)	21 (70)	43 (109)
Mean daily maximum °C (°F)	8 (46)	11 (52)	16 (61)	22 (72)	28 (82)	34 (93)	37 (99)	36 (97)	32 (90)	25 (77)	16 (61)	10 (50)	23 (73)
Daily mean °C (°F)	3 (37)	6 (43)	10 (50)	17 (63)	22 (72)	27 (81)	31 (88)	30 (86)	26 (79)	17 (63)	11 (52)	5 (41)	17 (63)
Mean daily minimum °C (°F)	0 (32)	2 (36)	6 (43)	12 (54)	17 (63)	21 (70)	24 (75)	24 (75)	20 (68)	14 (57)	7 (45)	2 (36)	12 (55)
Record low °C (°F)	−13 (9)	−10 (14)	−9 (16)	−1 (30)	2 (36)	9 (48)	13 (55)	13 (55)	8 (46)	2 (36)	−7 (19)	−11 (12)	−13 (9)
Average precipitation mm (inches)	29.8 (1.17)	30.5 (1.20)	37.3 (1.47)	32.0 (1.26)	9.2 (0.36)	5.4 (0.21)	7.1 (0.28)	5.0 (0.20)	1.0 (0.04)	9.9 (0.39)	26.4 (1.04)	24.7 (0.97)	218.3 (8.59)
Source 1: Voodoo Skies
Source 2: NOAA

Population history
Year	Pop.	±%
1976	50,292	—
1986	215,129	+327.8%
1991	230,183	+7.0%
1996	265,400	+15.3%
2006	357,171	+34.6%
2011	389,102	+8.9%
2016	448,129	+15.2%

== Population ==
Shadshahr was a relatively small town in the early 70s, under the Shah's rule, gradually through the 1980s, 1990s, 2000s as Tehran's population grew, so did the surrounding areas.

== Transportation ==
Eslamshahr is known for its handcrafted articles and its good weather. It also has Imam Khomeini International Airport within its city limits.

Media related to Eslamshahr at Wikimedia Commons
