= Ahmadabad-e Mostowfi =

City in Tehran province, Iran

Ahmadabad-e Mostowfi Persian: احمدآباد مستوفی
- City
- Location within Iran
- Coordinates: 35°38′04″N 51°12′49″E
- Country: Iran
- Province: Tehran
- County: Eslamshahr
- District: Ahmadabad-e Mostowfi
- Established as a city: 2012

Population (2016)
  - Total: 14,077
- Time zone: UTC+3:30 (IRST)

Ahmadabad-e Mostowfi (Persian: احمدآباد مستوفی) (Note: Also romanized as Aḩmadābād-e Mostowfī) is a city in, and the capital of, Ahmadabad-e Mostowfi District in Eslamshahr County, Tehran province, Iran. It also serves as the administrative center for Ahmadabad-e Mostowfi Rural District.

== Demographics ==
=== Population ===
At the time of the 2006 National Census, Ahmadabad-e Mostowfi's population was 2,781 in 2,781 households, when it was a village in Ahmadabad-e Mostowfi Rural District of the Central District. The following census in 2011 counted 11,278 people in 3,197 households. The 2016 census measured the population as 14,077 people in 4,386 households, by which time the rural district had been separated from the district in the formation of Ahmadabad-e Mostowfi District. Ahmadabad-e Mostowfi was converted to a city.
