= Hurand =

City in East Azerbaijan province, Iran

Hurand Persian: هوراند
- City
- Location within Iran
- Coordinates: 38°51′38″N 47°22′02″E
- Country: Iran
- Province: East Azerbaijan
- County: Hurand
- District: Central
- Established as a city: 1997

Population (2016)
  - Total: 4,658
- Time zone: UTC+3:30 (IRST)

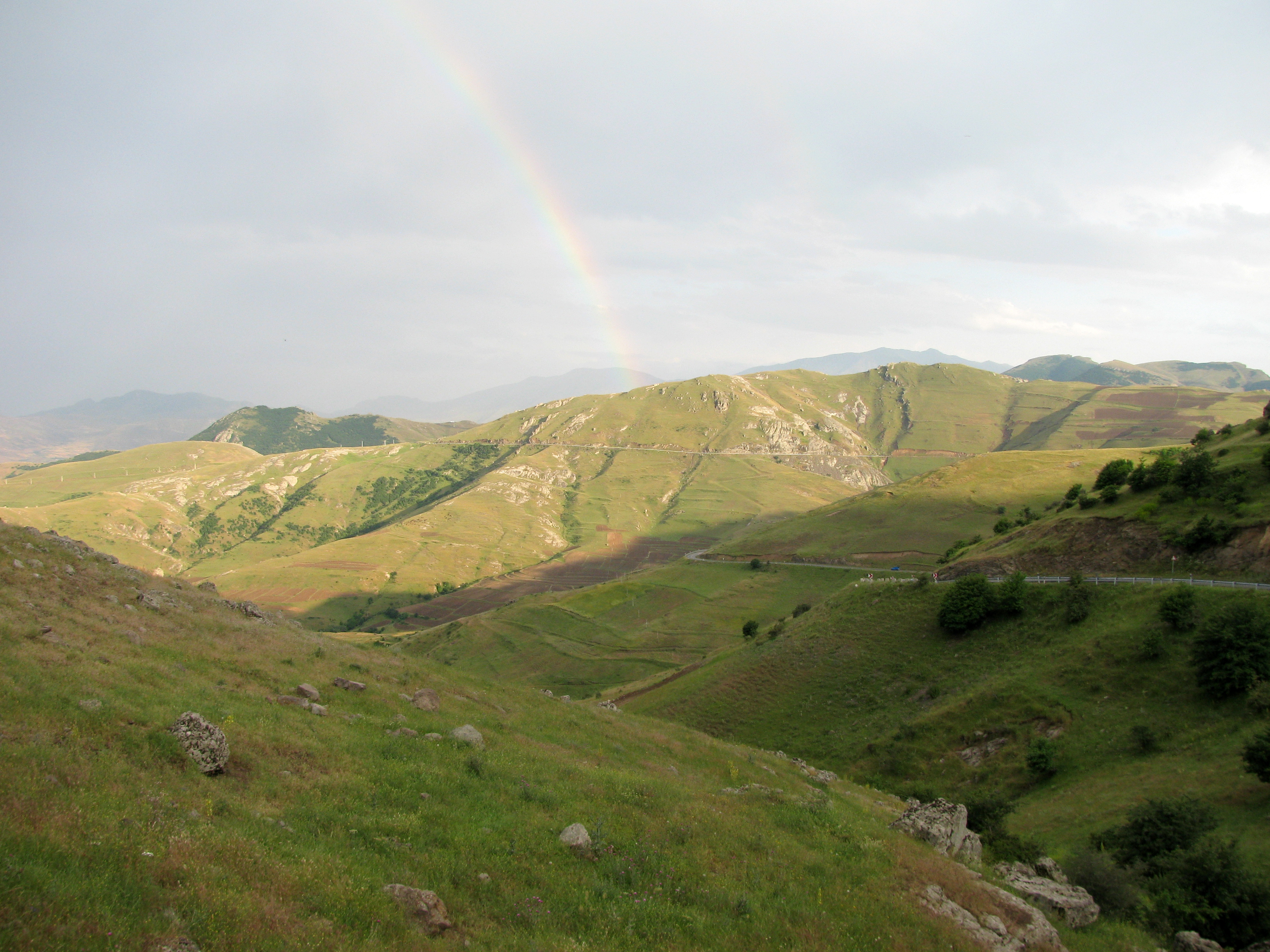

Hurand (Persian: هوراند) (Note: Also romanized as Howrānd and Hūrānd; also known as Horand) is a city in the Central District of Hurand County, East Azerbaijan province, Iran, serving as capital of both the county and the district. It is also the administrative center for Dodangeh Rural District. The village of Hurand was converted to a city in 1997.

== Demographics ==
=== Population ===
At the time of the 2006 National Census, the city's population was 3,876 in 907 households, when it was capital of the former Hurand District in Ahar County. The following census in 2011 counted 4,445 people in 1,127 households. The 2016 census measured the population of the city as 4,658 people in 1,352 households.

In 2018, the district was separated from the county in the establishment of Hurand County. The city and the rural district were transferred to the new Central District, with Hurand as the county's capital.Niq
