= Mafinabad =

Mafinabad is a village located in Eslamshahr County. In 1956 it had a population of 275.

It was occupied in Neolithic times, with pottery being found at an archaeological site.
