= Bahramabad Rural District =

Rural district in Tehran province, Iran

Bahramabad Rural District Persian: دهستان بهرام آباد
- Rural District
- Location within Iran
- Coordinates: 35°35′N 51°16′E
- Country: Iran
- Province: Tehran
- County: Eslamshahr
- District: Central
- Established: 2012
- Capital: Bahramabad

Population (2016)
  - Total: 9,599
- Time zone: UTC+3:30 (IRST)

Bahramabad Rural District (Persian: دهستان بهرام آباد) is in the Central District of Eslamshahr County, Tehran province, Iran. Its capital is the village of Bahramabad.

== History ==
Bahramabad Rural District was created in the Central District in 2012.

== Demographics ==
=== Population ===
At the time of the 2016 National Census, the rural district's population was 9,599 in 2,996 households. The most populous of its four villages was Shatareh, with 7,150 people.

=== Other villages in the rural district ===
- Malekabad
- Mehranabad
