= Karak-e Inkacheh =

Village in Tehran province, Iran

Karak-e Inkacheh Persian: كرك اينكچه
- Village
- Location within Iran
- Country: Iran
- Province: Tehran
- County: Eslamshahr
- District: Central
- Rural District: Deh Abbas

Population (2016)
  - Total: 119
- Time zone: UTC+3:30 (IRST)

Karak-e Inkacheh (Persian: كرك اينكچه) (Note: Also known as Karak and Kerek) is a village in Deh Abbas Rural District of the Central District in Eslamshahr County, Tehran province, Iran.

== Demographics ==
=== Population ===
At the time of the 2006 National Census, the village's population was 70 in 21 households. The following census in 2011 counted 56 people in 19 households. The 2016 census measured the population of the village as 119 people in 36 households.
