= Poshtab Castle =

Castle in Iran

- قلعه پشتاب
- Ahar County; Near Poshtab village in Iran
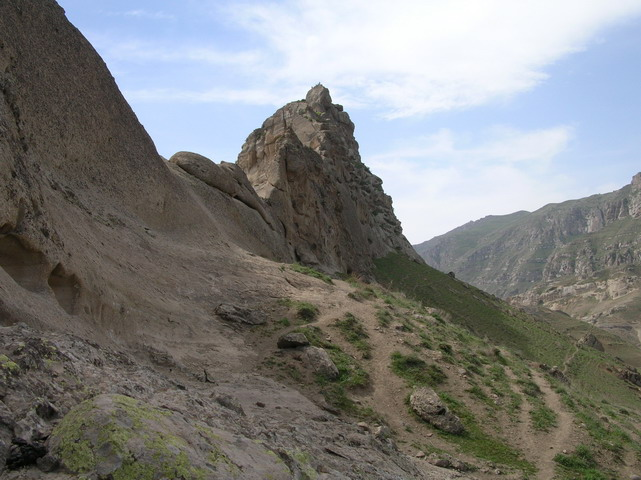
- Poshtab Castle

Site information
- Type: Castle

Poshtab Castle, also known Pashtou Castle (Persian: قلعه پشتاب) is an ancient site located in Poshtab village, Ahar County in northwestern Iran. The castle is built on a rock and features stairs and engraved cabins. With only one entry point, the other sides of Poshtab Castle are surrounded by inaccessible cliffs. The building dates back to the Sassanid and Parthian periods. Poshtab Fortification is located near Qahqaheh Castle.

== Resources ==
- قلعه پشتو يا پشتاب seeiran.ir In Persian language.
- قلعه-پشتاب-قلعه-پیشتو-اهر makanbin.com In Persian language.
- قلعه-پشتاب-پئشتو-قالاسی wikimapia.org
- قلعه پشتاب aharcg.ir In Persian language
