= Chahardangeh =

City in Tehran province, Iran

Chahardangeh Persian: چهاردانگه
- City
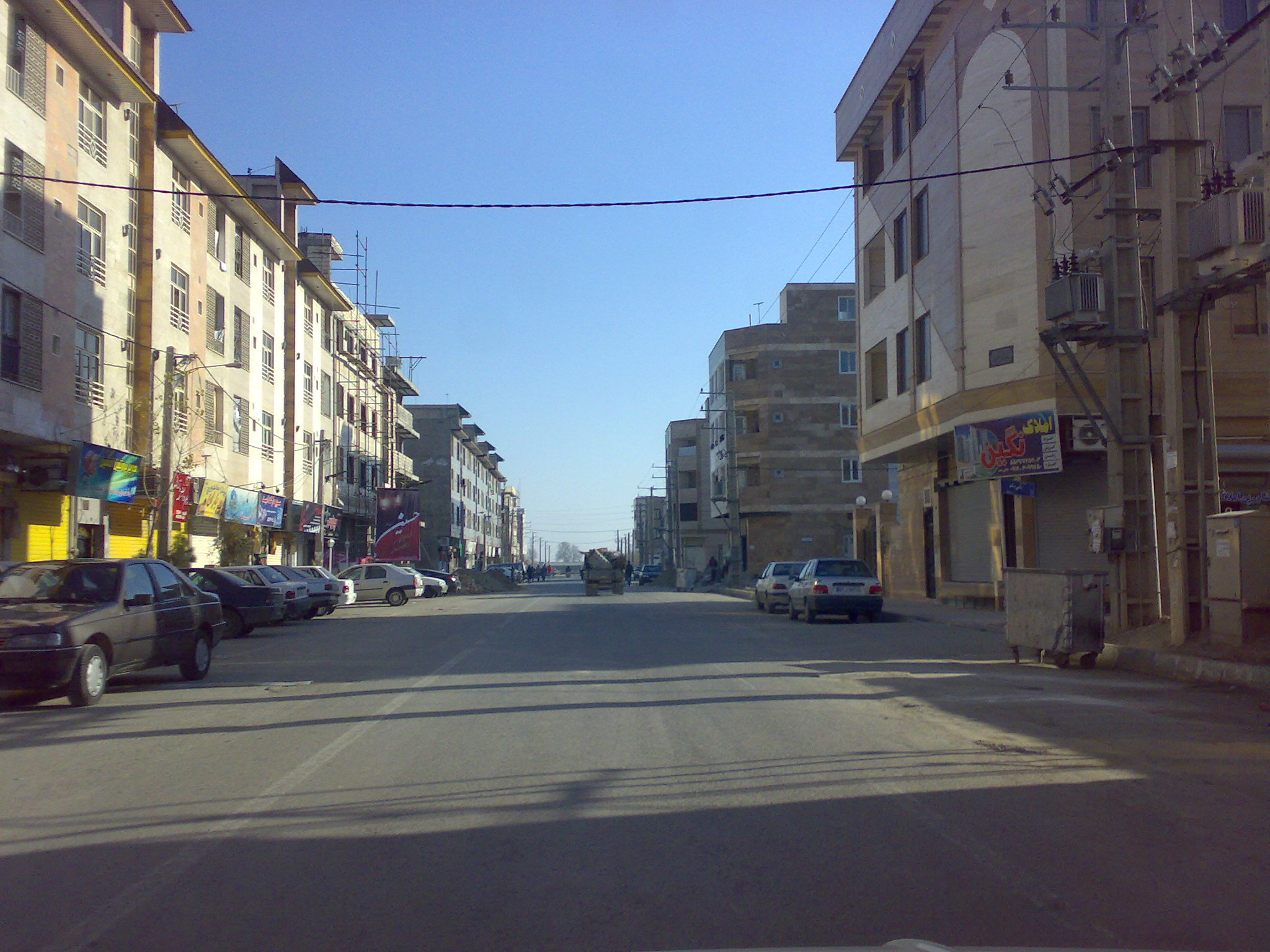
- Street in Chahardangeh

- Location within Iran
- Coordinates: 35°36′20″N 51°18′33″E
- Country: Iran
- Province: Tehran
- County: Eslamshahr
- District: Chahardangeh

Population (2016)
  - Total: 49,950
- Time zone: UTC+3:30 (IRST)

Chahardangeh (Persian: چهاردانگه) (Note: Also romanized as Chahār Dangeh, Chahār Dāngeh, and Chahārdangeh) is a city in, and the capital of, Chahardangeh District in Eslamshahr County, Tehran province, Iran. It also serves as the administrative center for Chahardangeh Rural District.

== Demographics ==
=== Population ===
At the time of the 2006 National Census, the city's population was 42,159 in 10,791 households. The following census in 2011 counted 46,299 people in 13,380 households. The 2016 census measured the population of the city as 49,950 people in 15,259 households.

== See also ==
Media related to Chahardangeh at Wikimedia Commons
