= Chahardangeh-ye Jonubi Rural District =

Rural district in East Azerbaijan province, Iran

Chahardangeh-ye Jonubi Rural District Persian: دهستان چهاردانگه جنوبی
- Rural District
- Location within Iran
- Coordinates: 38°59′N 47°24′E
- Country: Iran
- Province: East Azerbaijan
- County: Hurand
- District: Chahardangeh District
- Established: 2018
- Capital: Kuran
- Time zone: UTC+3:30 (IRST)

Chahardangeh-ye Jonubi Rural District (Persian: دهستان چهاردانگه جنوبی) is in Chahardangeh District of Hurand County, East Azerbaijan province, Iran. Its capital is the village of Kuran, whose population at the time of the 2016 National Census was 403 in 135 households.

== History ==
In 2018, Hurand District was separated from Ahar County in the establishment of Hurand County, and Chahardangeh-ye Jonubi Rural District was created in the new Chahardangeh District.

== Other villages in the rural district ==
- Arnan
- Kavir
- Qaleh Kandi
