= Deh Abbas, Salas-e Babajani =

Deh Abbas ده عباس
- Village
- Location within Iran
- Coordinates: 34°34′08″N 46°13′08″E
- Country: Iran
- Province: Kermanshah
- County: Salas-e Babajani
- Bakhsh: Central
- Rural District: Dasht-e Hor

Population (2006)
  - Total: 70
- Time zone: UTC+3:30 (IRST)
  - Summer (DST): UTC+4:30 (IRDT)

Deh Abbas (Persian: ده عباس, also Romanized as Deh ‘Abbās; also known as Dīvgah-e Bībīān and Dīvkah-e Bībīān) is a village in Dasht-e Hor Rural District, in the Central District of Salas-e Babajani County, Kermanshah Province, Iran. At the 2006 census, its population was 70, in 13 families.
