= Aznab-e Sofla, Kermanshah =

Aznab-e Sofla ازناب سفلي
- Village
- Location within Iran
- Coordinates: 34°38′29″N 47°18′09″E
- Country: Iran
- Province: Kermanshah
- County: Sahneh
- Bakhsh: Dinavar
- Rural District: Kanduleh

Population (2006)
  - Total: 71
- Time zone: UTC+3:30 (IRST)
  - Summer (DST): UTC+4:30 (IRDT)

Aznab-e Sofla (Persian: ازناب سفلي, also Romanized as Aznāb-e Soflá) is a village in Kanduleh Rural District, Dinavar District, Sahneh County, Kermanshah Province, Iran. At the 2006 census, its population was 71, in 17 families.
