= Monastery of Al-Karkas =

Monastery in Egypt

The Monastery of Al-Karkas is a monastery in Egypt. It stands on a mountain and is said to be unapproachable by road.
