= Deh Abbasan =

Village in Kermanshah, Iran

Deh Abbasan ده عباسان
- Village
- Location within Iran
- Coordinates: 33°58′11″N 46°59′16″E
- Country: Iran
- Province: Kermanshah
- County: Kermanshah
- Bakhsh: Firuzabad
- Rural District: Jalalvand

Population (2006)
  - Total: 107
- Time zone: UTC+3:30 (IRST)
  - Summer (DST): UTC+4:30 (IRDT)

Deh Abbasan (Persian: ده عباسان, also Romanized as Deh ‘Abbāsān; also known as Deh ‘Abbās and Deh ‘Abbāsīān) is a village in Jalalvand Rural District, Firuzabad District, Kermanshah County, Kermanshah Province, Iran. At the 2006 census, its population was 107, in 23 families.
