= Kork, Kerman =

Kork كرك
- Village
- Location within Iran
- Coordinates: 29°09′22″N 58°29′20″E
- Country: Iran
- Province: Kerman
- County: Bam
- Bakhsh: Central
- Rural District: Kork and Nartich

Population (2006)
  - Total: 565
- Time zone: UTC+3:30 (IRST)
  - Summer (DST): UTC+4:30 (IRDT)

Kork (Persian: كرك, also Romanized as Kark; also known as Kork-e ‘Olyā and Kurk) is a village in Kork and Nartich Rural District, in the Central District of Bam County, Kerman Province, Iran. At the 2006 census, its population was 565, in 177 families.
