= Aznab, Qazvin =

Aznab ازناب
- Village
- Location within Iran
- Coordinates: 35°45′33″N 48°52′02″E
- Country: Iran
- Province: Qazvin
- County: Avaj
- Bakhsh: Central
- Rural District: Hesar-e Valiyeasr

Population (2006)
  - Total: 89
- Time zone: UTC+3:30 (IRST)

Aznab (Persian: ازناب, also Romanized as Aznāb) is a village in Hesar-e Valiyeasr Rural District, Central District, Avaj County, Qazvin Province, Iran. At the 2006 census, its population was 89, in 22 families.
