= Davudlu, Agdash =

Davudlu
- Location within Azerbaijan
- Coordinates: 40°35′45″N 47°24′10″E
- Country: Azerbaijan
- Rayon: Agdash
- Time zone: UTC+4 (AZT)
  - Summer (DST): UTC+5 (AZT)

Davudlu (also, Dovudlu) is a village in the Agdash Rayon of Azerbaijan.
