= Aydinlu, West Azerbaijan =

Aydenloo آیدنلو
- Village
- Location within Iran
- Coordinates: 37°32′13″N 45°12′23″E
- Country: Iran
- Province: West Azerbaijan
- County: Urmia
- Bakhsh: Central
- Rural District: Bakeshluchay

Population (2006)
  - Total: 91
- Time zone: UTC+3:30 (IRST)
  - Summer (DST): UTC+4:30 (IRDT)

Aydenlu (Persian: آيدينلو, also Romanized as Āydenlū; also known as Āydīnlū) is a village in Bakeshluchay Rural District, in the Central District of Urmia County, West Azerbaijan Province, Iran. At the 2006 census, its population was 91, in 33 families.
