= Chahardangeh Rural District (Eslamshahr County) =

Rural district in Tehran province, Iran

Chahardangeh Rural District Persian: دهستان چهاردانگه
- Rural District
- Location within Iran
- Coordinates: 35°36′N 51°20′E
- Country: Iran
- Province: Tehran
- County: Eslamshahr
- District: Chahardangeh
- Established: 1994
- Capital: Chahardangeh

Population (2016)
  - Total: 1,607
- Time zone: UTC+3:30 (IRST)

Chahardangeh Rural District (Persian: دهستان چهاردانگه) is in Chahardangeh District of Eslamshahr County, Tehran province, Iran. It is administered from the city of Chahardangeh.

== Demographics ==
=== Population ===
At the time of the 2011 National Census, the rural district's population was below the reporting threshold. The 2016 census measured the population of the rural district as 1,607 in 469 households. The most populous of its two villages was Aliabad-e Qajar, with 1,607 people; the other village, Khomarabad, showed a population of zero.
