= Aznab-e Olya, Kermanshah =

Aznab-e Olya ازناب عليا
- Village
- Location within Iran
- Coordinates: 34°39′12″N 47°17′54″E
- Country: Iran
- Province: Kermanshah
- County: Sahneh
- Bakhsh: Dinavar
- Rural District: Kanduleh

Population (2006)
  - Total: 80
- Time zone: UTC+3:30 (IRST)
  - Summer (DST): UTC+4:30 (IRDT)

Aznab-e Olya (Persian: ازناب عليا, also Romanized as Aznāb-e ‘Olyā) is a village in Kanduleh Rural District, Dinavar District, Sahneh County, Kermanshah Province, Iran. At the 2006 census, its population was 80, in 19 families.
