= Deh-e Abbas, Kerman =

Deh-e Abbas ده عباس
- Village
- Location within Iran
- Coordinates: 30°33′57″N 56°29′05″E
- Country: Iran
- Province: Kerman
- County: Zarand
- Bakhsh: Central
- Rural District: Jorjafak

Population (2006)
  - Total: 105
- Time zone: UTC+3:30 (IRST)
  - Summer (DST): UTC+4:30 (IRDT)

Deh-e Abbas (Persian: ده عباس, also Romanized as Deh-e ‘Abbās and Deh ‘Abbās) is a village in Jorjafak Rural District, in the Central District of Zarand County, Kerman Province, Iran. At the 2006 census, its population was 105, in 22 families.
