= Firuzbahram Rural District =

Rural district in Tehran province, Iran

Firuzbahram Rural District Persian: دهستان فيروزبهرام
- Rural District
- Location within Iran
- Coordinates: 35°38′N 51°16′E
- Country: Iran
- Province: Tehran
- County: Eslamshahr
- District: Chahardangeh
- Established: 1986
- Capital: Firuzbahram

Population (2016)
  - Total: 9,074
- Time zone: UTC+3:30 (IRST)

Firuzbahram Rural District (Persian: دهستان فيروزبهرام) is in Chahardangeh District of Eslamshahr County, Tehran province, Iran. Its capital is the village of Firuzbahram.

== Demographics ==
=== Population ===
At the time of the 2006 National Census, the rural district's population was 10,882 in 2,780 households. There were 11,501 inhabitants in 3,183 households at the following census of 2011. The 2016 census measured the population of the rural district as 9,074 in 3,053 households. The most populous of its five villages was Gol Dasteh, with 7,602 people.

=== Other villages in the rural district ===
- Shamsabad
- Torshanbeh
