= Deh-e Abbas, Sonqor =

Deh-e Abbas ده عباس
- Village
- Location within Iran
- Coordinates: 34°54′28″N 47°35′28″E
- Country: Iran
- Province: Kermanshah
- County: Sonqor
- Bakhsh: Central
- Rural District: Gavrud

Population (2006)
  - Total: 169
- Time zone: UTC+3:30 (IRST)
  - Summer (DST): UTC+4:30 (IRDT)

Deh-e Abbas (Persian: ده عباس, also Romanized as Deh-e ‘Abbās and Deh ‘Abbās; also known as Da Abbas) is a village in Gavrud Rural District, in the Central District of Sonqor County, Kermanshah Province, Iran. At the 2006 census, its population was 169, in 31 families.
