= Ahmadabad-e Mostowfi Rural District =

Rural district in Tehran province, Iran

Ahmadabad-e Mostowfi Rural District Persian: دهستان احمدآباد مستوفی
- Rural District
- Location within Iran
- Coordinates: 35°37′N 51°13′E
- Country: Iran
- Province: Tehran
- County: Eslamshahr
- District: Ahmadabad-e Mostowfi
- Established: 2000
- Capital: Ahmadabad-e Mostowfi

Population (2016)
  - Total: 3,910
- Time zone: UTC+3:30 (IRST)

Ahmadabad-e Mostowfi Rural District (Persian: دهستان احمدآباد مستوفی) is in Ahmadabad-e Mostowfi District of Eslamshahr County, Tehran province, Iran. It is administered from the city of Ahmadabad-e Mostowfi.

== Demographics ==
=== Population ===
At the time of the 2006 National Census, the rural district's population (as a part of the Central District) was 14,154 in 3,510 households. There were 15,887 inhabitants in 4,147 households at the following census of 2011. The 2016 census measured the population of the rural district as 3,910 in 935 households, by which time the rural district had been separated from the district in the formation of Ahmadabad-e Mostowfi District. The most populous of its four villages was Hasanabad-e Khaleseh, with 3,568 people.

=== Other villages in the rural district ===
- Aliabad
- Raziabad
