= Deh Abbas Rural District =

Rural district in Tehran province, Iran

Deh Abbas Rural District Persian: دهستان ده عباس
- Rural District
- Location within Iran
- Coordinates: 35°32′N 51°16′E
- Country: Iran
- Province: Tehran
- County: Eslamshahr
- District: Central
- Established: 1986
- Capital: Deh Abbas

Population (2016)
  - Total: 7,625
- Time zone: UTC+3:30 (IRST)

Deh Abbas Rural District (Persian: دهستان ده عباس) is in the Central District of Eslamshahr County, Tehran province, Iran. Its capital is the village of Deh Abbas.

== Demographics ==
=== Population ===
At the time of the 2006 National Census, the rural district's population was 22,826 in 5,635 households. There were 22,894 inhabitants in 6,214 households at the following census of 2011. The 2016 census measured the population of the rural district as 7,625 in 2,153 households. The most populous of its nine villages was Hoseynabad, with 3,899 people.

=== Other villages in the rural district ===
- Aliabad-e Tapancheh
- Hoseynabad-e Siahab
- Karak-e Inkacheh
- Nezamabad
- Simun
