= Dikleh Rural District =

Rural district in East Azerbaijan province, Iran

Dikleh Rural District Persian: دهستان ديكله
- Rural District
- Location within Iran
- Coordinates: 38°42′N 47°18′E
- Country: Iran
- Province: East Azerbaijan
- County: Hurand
- District: Central
- Established: 1987
- Capital: Majidabad

Population (2016)
  - Total: 3,090
- Time zone: UTC+3:30 (IRST)

Dikleh Rural District (Persian: دهستان ديكله) is in the Central District of Hurand County, East Azerbaijan province, Iran. Its capital is the village of Majidabad.

== Demographics ==
=== Population ===
At the time of the 2006 National Census, the rural district's population (as a part of the former Hurand District in Ahar County) was 4,017 in 863 households. There were 3,602 inhabitants in 924 households at the following census of 2011. The 2016 census measured the population of the rural district as 3,090 in 923 households. The most populous of its 24 villages was Moradlu, with 512 people.

In 2018, the district was separated from the county in the establishment of Hurand County, and the rural district was transferred to the new Central District.

=== Other villages in the rural district ===
- Huri Daraq
- Lorum
- Navansar
