= Chahardangeh District (Eslamshahr County) =

District in Tehran province, Iran

Chahardangeh District Persian: بخش چهاردانگه
- District
- Location within Iran
- Coordinates: 35°36′N 51°19′E
- Country: Iran
- Province: Tehran
- County: Eslamshahr
- Established: 1994
- Capital: Chahardangeh

Population (2016)
  - Total: 60,631
- Time zone: UTC+3:30 (IRST)

Chahardangeh District (Persian: بخش چهاردانگه) is in Eslamshahr County, Tehran province, Iran. Its capital is the city of Chahardangeh.

== Demographics ==
=== Population ===
At the time of the 2006 census, the district's population was 53,041 in 13,751 households. The following census in 2011 counted 57,805 people in 16,564 households. The 2016 census measured the population of the district as 60,631 inhabitants in 18,781 households.

=== Administrative divisions ===
Chahardangeh District Population
Administrative Divisions	2006	2011	2016
Chahardangeh RD		(Note: Below the reporting threshold)	1,607
Firuzbahram RD	10,882	11,501	9,074
Chahardangeh (city)	42,159	46,299	49,950
Total	53,041	57,805	60,631
RD = Rural District
