= Chahardangeh District (Hurand County) =

District in East Azerbaijan province, Iran

Chahardangeh District Persian: بخش چهاردانگه
- District
- Location within Iran
- Coordinates: 39°01′N 47°24′E
- Country: Iran
- Province: East Azerbaijan
- County: Hurand
- Established: 2018
- Capital: Aq Beraz
- Time zone: UTC+3:30 (IRST)

Chahardangeh District (Persian: بخش چهاردانگه) is in Hurand County, East Azerbaijan province, Iran. Its capital is the village of Aq Beraz, whose population at the time of the 2016 National Census was 654 people in 174 households.

== History ==
In 2018, Hurand District was separated from Ahar County in the establishment of Hurand County, which was divided into two districts of two rural districts each, with Hurand as its capital and only city at the time.

== Demographics ==
=== Administrative divisions ===
Chahardangeh District
Administrative Divisions
Chahardangeh-ye Jonubi RD
Chahardangeh-ye Shomali RD (Note: Formerly Chahardangeh Rural District)
RD = Rural District
