= Ahmadabad-e Mostowfi District =

District in Tehran province, Iran

Ahmadabad-e Mostowfi District Persian: بخش احمدآباد مستوفی
- District
- Location within Iran
- Coordinates: 35°36′01″N 51°12′35″E
- Country: Iran
- Province: Tehran
- County: Eslamshahr
- Established: 2012
- Capital: Ahmadabad-e Mostowfi

Population (2016)
  - Total: 22,611
- Time zone: UTC+3:30 (IRST)

Ahmadabad-e Mostowfi District (Persian: بخش احمدآباد مستوفی) is in Eslamshahr County, Tehran province, Iran. Its capital is the city of Ahmadabad-e Mostowfi.

== History ==
In 2012, Ahmadabad-e Mostowfi Rural District was separated from the Central District in the formation of Ahmadabad-e Mostowfi District, and the village of Ahmadabad-e Mostowfi was converted to a city.

== Demographics ==
=== Population ===
At the time of the 2016 National Census, the district's population was 22,611 inhabitants in 6,700 households.

=== Administrative divisions ===
Ahmadabad-e Mostowfi District Population
Administrative Divisions	2016
Ahmadabad-e Mostowfi RD	3,910
Chichaklu RD	4,624
Ahmadabad-e Mostowfi (city)	14,077
Total	22,611
RD = Rural District
