= Central District (Hurand County) =

District in East Azerbaijan province, Iran

Central District (Hurand County) Persian: بخش مرکزی شهرستان هوراند
- District
- Location within Iran
- Coordinates: 38°48′N 47°22′E
- Country: Iran
- Province: East Azerbaijan
- County: Hurand
- Established: 2018
- Capital: Hurand
- Time zone: UTC+3:30 (IRST)

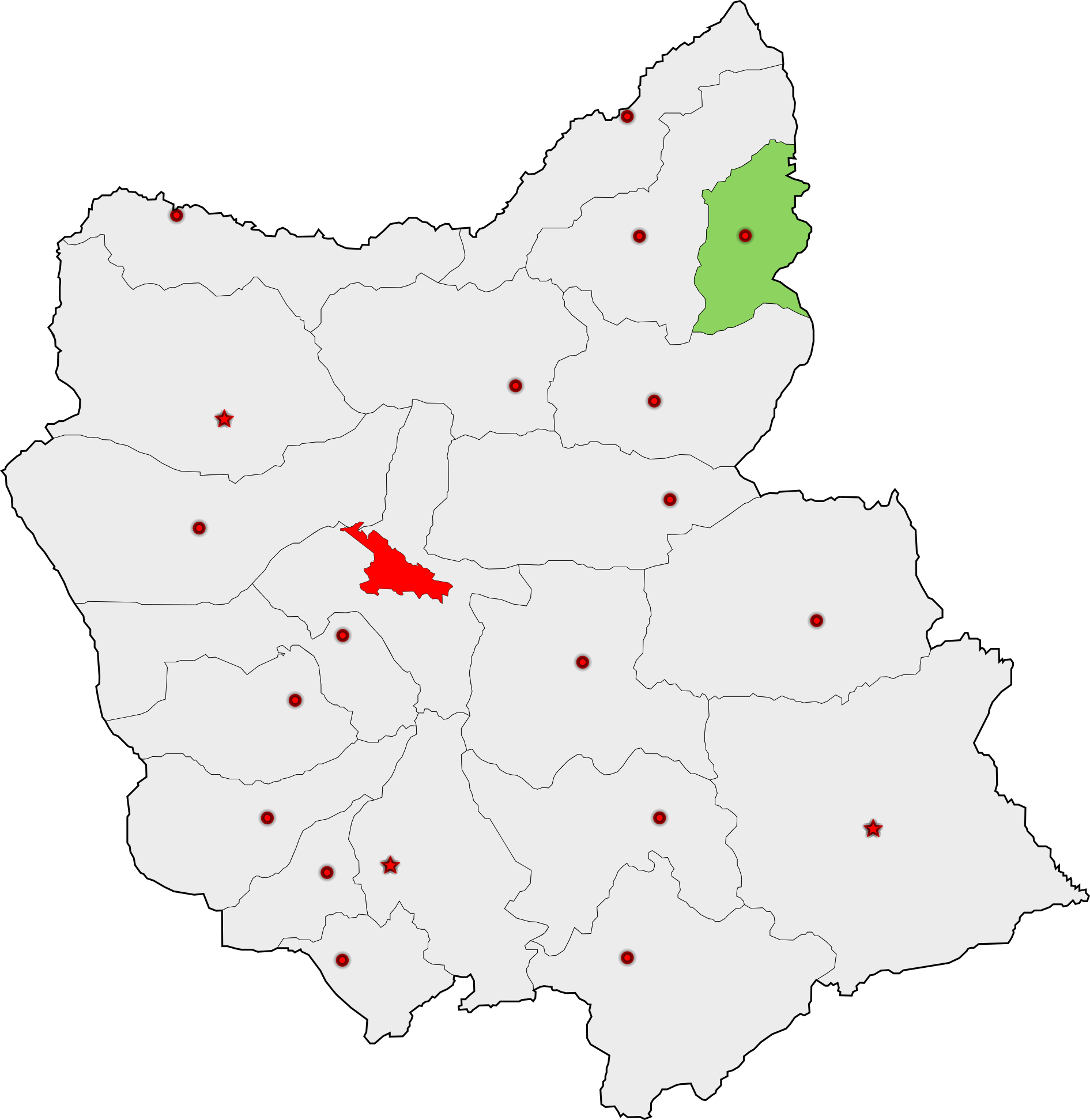
Horand County, East Azerbaijan Province, Iran

The Central District of Hurand County (Persian: بخش مرکزی شهرستان هوراند) is in East Azerbaijan province, Iran. Its capital is the city of Hurand, whose population at the 2016 National Census was 4,658 in 1,352 households.

== History ==
In 2018, Hurand District was separated from Ahar County in the establishment of Hurand County, which was divided into two districts of two rural districts each, with Hurand as its capital and only city at the time.

== Demographics ==
=== Administrative divisions ===
Central District (Hurand County)
Administrative divisions
Dikleh RD
Dodangeh RD
Hurand (city)
RD = Rural District
