= Eslamshahr County =

County in Tehran province, Iran

Eslamshahr County Persian: شهرستان اسلام‌شهر
- County
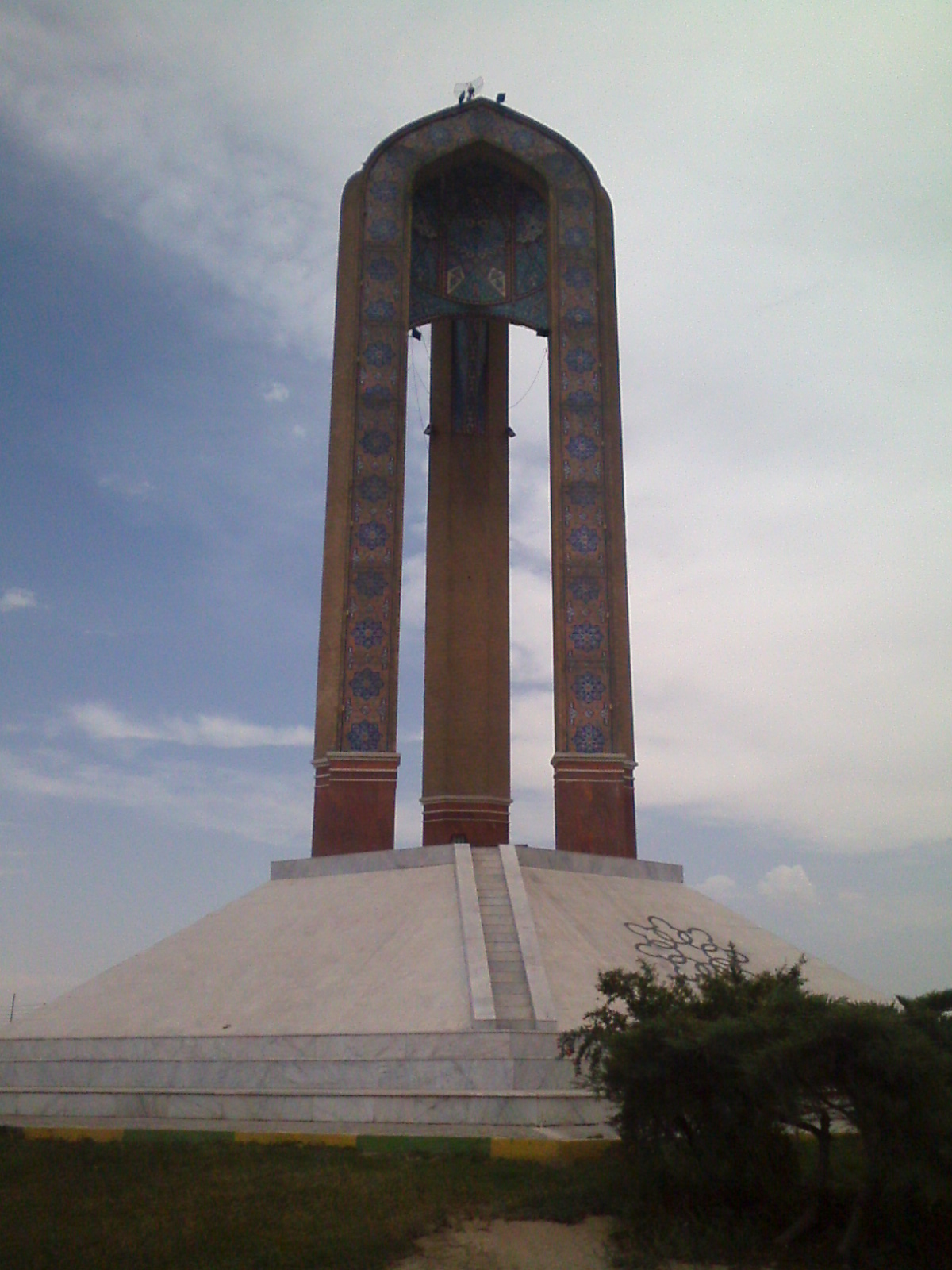
- Namaz Square

- Location of Eslamshahr County in Tehran province (center left, green)

- Location of Tehran province in Iran
- Coordinates: 35°35′N 51°17′E
- Country: Iran
- Province: Tehran
- Established: 1994
- Capital: Eslamshahr
- Districts: Central, Ahmadabad-e Mostowfi, Chahardangeh

Area
  - Total: 193 km^{2} (75 sq mi)

Population (2016)
  - Total: 548,620
  - Density: 2,840/km^{2} (7,360/sq mi)
- Time zone: UTC+3:30 (IRST)

Eslamshahr County (Persian: شهرستان اسلام‌شهر) is in Tehran province, Iran. Its capital is the city of Eslamshahr.

== History ==
In 2012, Bahramabad Rural District was created in the Central District, and Ahmadabad-e Mostowfi Rural District was separated from it in the formation of Ahmadabad-e Mostowfi District, which was divided into two rural districts, including the new Chichaklu Rural District. In addition, the village of Ahmadabad-e Mostowfi was converted to a city.

== Demographics ==
=== Population ===
At the time of the 2006 National Census, the county's population was 447,192 in 114,009 households. The following census in 2011 counted 485,688 people in 139,408 households. The 2016 census measured the population of the county as 548,620 in 168,288 households.

=== Administrative divisions ===
Eslamshahr County's population history and administrative structure over three consecutive censuses are shown in the following table.

Eslamshahr County Population
Administrative Divisions	2006	2011	2016
Central District	394,151	427,883	465,353
Ahmadabad-e Mostowfi RD	14,154	15,887	
Bahramabad RD			9,599
Deh Abbas RD	22,826	22,894	7,625
Eslamshahr (city)	357,171	389,102	448,129
Ahmadabad-e Mostowfi District			22,611
Ahmadabad-e Mostowfi RD			3,910
Chichaklu RD			4,624
Ahmadabad-e Mostowfi (city)			14,077
Chahardangeh District	53,041	57,805	60,631
Chahardangeh RD		(Note: Below the reporting threshold)	1,607
Firuzbahram RD	10,882	11,501	9,074
Chahardangeh (city)	42,159	46,299	49,950
Total	447,192	485,688	548,620
RD = Rural District

=== Villages ===
- Ali Abad Qajar
- Chichaklu
- Gol Dasteh
- Hasanabad-e Khaleseh
- Hoseynabad
- Mafinabad
- Shatareh

== Climate ==
According to the information of the State Meteorological Organization of Iran, the long-term average annual rainfall of Eslamshahr County is around 215 mm

== See also ==
Media related to Eslamshahr County at Wikimedia Commons
