= Chahardangeh-ye Shomali Rural District =

Rural district in East Azerbaijan province, Iran

Chahardangeh-ye Shomali Rural District Persian: دهستان چهاردانگه شمالی
- Rural District
- Location within Iran
- Coordinates: 39°02′N 47°27′E
- Country: Iran
- Province: East Azerbaijan
- County: Hurand
- District: Chahardangeh District
- Established: 1987
- Capital: Aq Beraz

Population (2016)
  - Total: 7,693
- Time zone: UTC+3:30 (IRST)

Chahardangeh-ye Shomali Rural District (Persian: دهستان چهاردانگه شمالی) (Note: Formerly Chahardangeh Rural District (دهستان چهاردانگه)) is in Chahardangeh District of Hurand County, East Azerbaijan province, Iran. Its capital is the village of Aq Beraz.

== Demographics ==
=== Population ===
At the time of the 2006 National Census, the rural district's population (as Chahardangeh Rural District of the former Hurand District in Ahar County) was 8,241 in 1,602 households. There were 7,612 inhabitants in 1,951 households at the following census of 2011. The 2016 census measured the population of the rural district as 7,693 in 2,254 households. The most populous of its 42 villages was Arnan (now in Chahardangeh-ye Jonubi Rural District), with 687 people.

In 2018, the district was separated from the county in the establishment of Hurand County. The rural district was transferred to the new Chahardangeh District and renamed Chahardangeh-ye Shomali Rural District.

=== Other villages in the rural district ===
- Aznab-e Sofla
- Mardilu
- Qamishlu
- Qarah Qayah-ye Shakarlu
- Tabestanaq
