= Central District (Eslamshahr County) =

District in Tehran province, Iran

Central District (Eslamshahr County) Persian: بخش مرکزی شهرستان اسلام‌شهر
- District
- Location within Iran
- Coordinates: 35°32′32″N 51°15′18″E
- Country: Iran
- Province: Tehran
- County: Eslamshahr
- Established: 1994
- Capital: Eslamshahr

Population (2016)
  - Total: 465,353
- Time zone: UTC+3:30 (IRST)

The Central District of Eslamshahr County (Persian: بخش مرکزی شهرستان اسلام‌شهر) is in Tehran province, Iran. Its capital is the city of Eslamshahr.

== History ==
In 2012, Bahramabad Rural District was created in the district, and Ahmadabad-e Mostowfi Rural District was separated from it in the formation of Ahmadabad-e Mostowfi District. In addition, the village of Ahmadabad-e Mostowfi was converted to a city.

== Demographics ==
=== Population ===
At the time of the 2006 census, the district's population was 394,151 in 100,438 households. The following census in 2011 counted 427,883 people in 122,848 households. The 2016 census measured the population of the district as 465,353 inhabitants in 142,787 households.

=== Administrative divisions ===
Central District (Eslamshahr County) Population
Administrative Divisions	2006	2011	2016
Ahmadabad-e Mostowfi RD (Note: Transferred to Ahmadabad-e Mostowfi District)	14,154	15,887	
Bahramabad RD			9,599
Deh Abbas RD	22,826	22,894	7,625
Eslamshahr (city)	357,171	389,102	448,129
Total	394,151	427,883	465,353
RD = Rural District
