= Dodangeh Rural District (Hurand County) =

Rural district in East Azerbaijan province, Iran

Dodangeh Rural District Persian: دهستان دودانگه
- Rural District
- Location within Iran
- Coordinates: 38°53′N 47°24′E
- Country: Iran
- Province: East Azerbaijan
- County: Hurand
- District: Central
- Established: 1987
- Capital: Hurand

Population (2016)
  - Total: 5,260
- Time zone: UTC+3:30 (IRST)

Dodangeh Rural District (Persian: دهستان دودانگه) is in the Central District of Hurand County, East Azerbaijan province, Iran. It is administered from the city of Hurand.

== Demographics ==
=== Population ===
At the time of the 2006 National Census, the rural district's population (as a part of the former Hurand District in Ahar County) was 6,394 in 1,372 households. There were 5,430 inhabitants in 1,502 households at the following census of 2011. The 2016 census measured the population of the rural district as 5,260 in 1,625 households. The most populous of its 45 villages was Injar, with 708 people.

In 2018, the district was separated from the county in the establishment of Hurand County, and the rural district was transferred to the new Central District.

=== Other villages in the rural district ===
- Dehrud
- Gavlan
- Havay
- Leghlan
- Mohammadabad
- Pashtab
