= Hurand County =

County in East Azerbaijan province, Iran

Hurand County Persian: شهرستان هوراند
- County
- Location of Hurand County in East Azerbaijan province (top right, purple)

- Location of East Azerbaijan province in Iran
- Coordinates: 38°52′N 47°22′E
- Country: Iran
- Province: East Azerbaijan
- Established: 2018
- Capital: Hurand
- Districts: Central, Chahardangeh
- Time zone: UTC+3:30 (IRST)

Hurand County (Persian: شهرستان هوراند) is in East Azerbaijan province, Iran. Its capital is the city of Hurand, whose population at the time of the 2016 National Census was 4,658 in 1,352 households.

== History ==
In 2018, Hurand District was separated from Ahar County in the establishment of Hurand County, which was divided into two districts of two rural districts each, with Hurand as its capital and only city at the time.

== Demographics ==
=== Administrative divisions ===
Hurand County's administrative structure is shown in the following table.

Hurand County
Administrative Divisions
Central District
Dikleh RD
Dodangeh RD
Hurand (city)
Chahardangeh District
Chahardangeh-ye Jonubi RD
Chahardangeh-ye Shomali RD (Note: Formerly Chahardangeh Rural District)
RD = Rural District
