= Hurand District =

Former district in East Azerbaijan province, Iran

Hurand District Persian: بخش هوراند
- Former District
- Location within Iran
- Coordinates: 38°52′N 47°22′E
- Country: Iran
- Province: East Azerbaijan
- County: Ahar
- Capital: Hurand

Population (2016)
  - Total: 20,701
- Time zone: UTC+3:30 (IRST)

Hurand District (Persian: بخش هوراند) is a former administrative division of Ahar County, East Azerbaijan province, Iran. Its capital was the city of Hurand.

== History ==
In 2018, the district was separated from the county in the establishment of Hurand County

== Demographics ==
=== Population ===
At the time of the 2006 National Census, the district's population was 22,528 in 4,744 households. The following census in 2011 counted 21,089 people in 5,504 households. The 2016 census measured the population of the district as 20,701 inhabitants in 6,154 households.

=== Administrative divisions ===
Hurand District Population
Administrative Divisions	2006	2011	2016
Chahardangeh RD	8,241	7,612	7,693
Dikleh RD	4,017	3,602	3,090
Dodangeh RD	6,394	5,430	5,260
Hurand (city)	3,876	4,445	4,658
Total	22,528	21,089	20,701
RD = Rural District
