= Ahar County =

County in East Azerbaijan province, Iran

Ahar County Persian: شهرستان اهر
- County
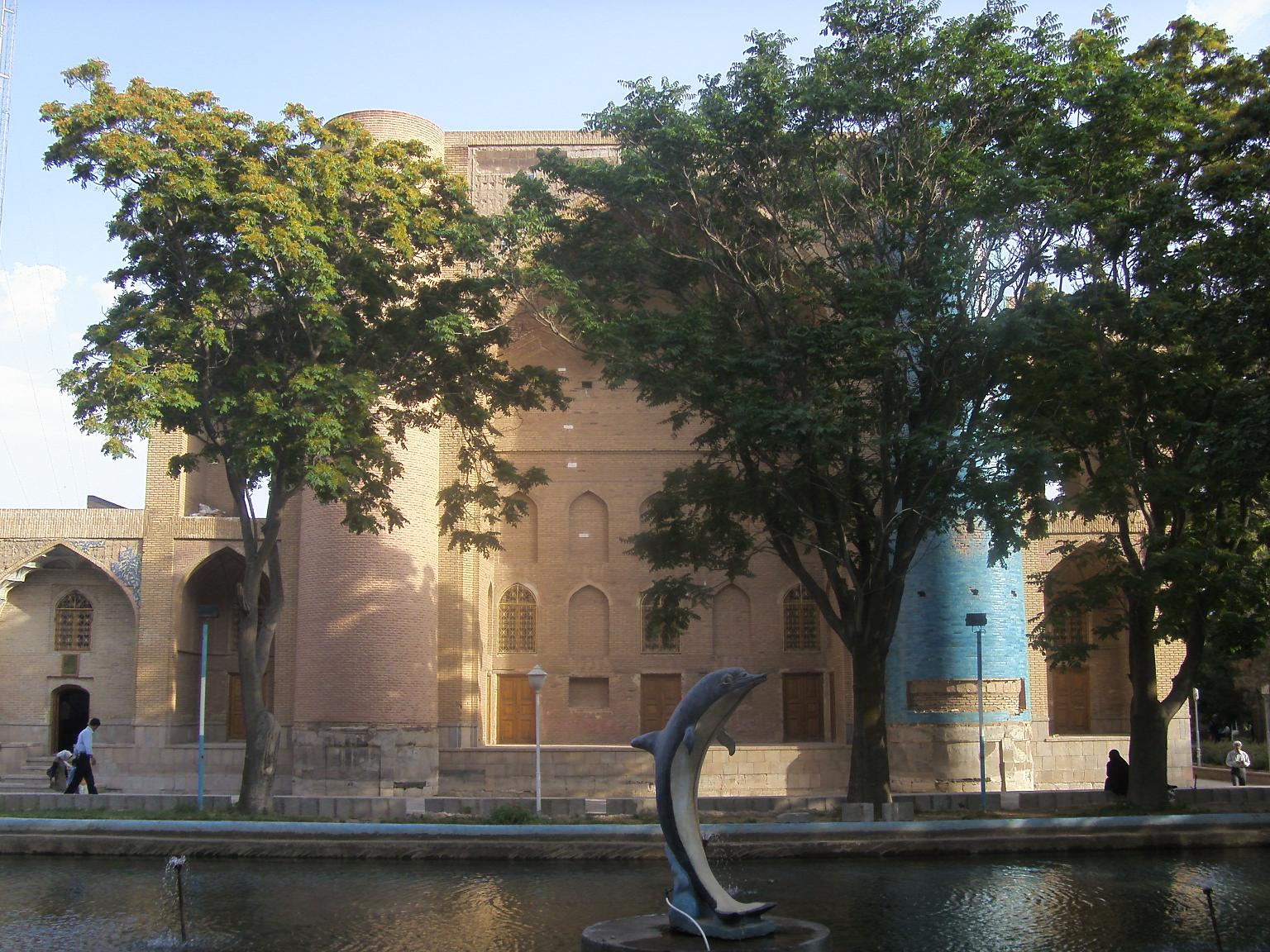
- Sheykh Shahab Tomb in the city of Ahar

- Location of Ahar County in East Azerbaijan province (top right, green)

- Location of East Azerbaijan province in Iran
- Coordinates: 38°32′N 47°09′E
- Country: Iran
- Province: East Azerbaijan
- Capital: Ahar
- Districts: Central, Fandoqlu

Population (2016)
  - Total: 154,530
- Time zone: UTC+3:30 (IRST)

Ahar County (Persian: شهرستان اهر) is in East Azerbaijan province, Iran. Its capital is the city of Ahar.

== History ==
In 2018, Qeshlaq Rural District was separated from the Central District in the formation of Fandoqlu District, including the new Naqduz Rural District. At the same time, Hurand District was separated from the county in the establishment of Hurand County.

== Demographics ==
=== Population ===
At the time of the 2006 National Census, the county's population was 147,781 in 34,067 households. The following census in 2011 counted 150,111 people in 39,715 households. The 2016 census measured the population of the county as 154,530 in 46,202 households.

=== Administrative divisions ===
Ahar County's population history and administrative structure over three consecutive censuses are shown in the following table.

Ahar County Population
Administrative Divisions	2006	2011	2016
Central District	125,253	129,022	133,829
Azghan RD	7,100	6,314	6,204
Bozkosh RD	4,900	5,012	4,141
Goyjah Bel RD	5,056	4,269	4,307
Owch Hacha RD	5,286	4,670	4,407
Qeshlaq RD	12,028	11,448	9,833
Vargahan RD	5,101	4,701	4,296
Ahar (city)	85,782	92,608	100,641
Fandoqlu District (Note: Established after the 2016 census)			
Naqduz RD			
Qeshlaq RD			
Hurand District (Note: Transferred to Hurand County after the 2016 census)	22,528	21,089	20,701
Chahardangeh RD	8,241	7,612	7,693
Dikleh RD	4,017	3,602	3,090
Dodangeh RD	6,394	5,430	5,260
Hurand (city)	3,876	4,445	4,658
Total	147,781	150,111	154,530
RD = Rural District

== Castles ==
- Poshtab Castle

== See also ==
Media related to Ahar County at Wikimedia Commons
