= Anbaq =

Anbaq (Persian: انباق) may refer to:

- Anbaq-e Hajjikhan
- Anbaq-e Javad
- Anbaq-e Olya
- Anbaq-e Sorkhay
