= Mollalar =

Mollalar may refer to:

- Mollalar (40° 05' N 46° 50' E), Agdam, Azerbaijan
- Mollalar (40° 09' N 46° 52' E), Agdam, Azerbaijan
- Mollalar, Barda, Azerbaijan
- Mollalar, Lachin, Azerbaijan
- Mollalar, Tovuz, Azerbaijan
- Mollalar, Ardabil, Iran
- Mollalar, East Azerbaijan, Iran
- Mollalar-e Mohammadreza Kandi, East Azerbaijan Province, Iran
- Mollalar, Zanjan, Iran
