= Sari Suli =

Village in East Azerbaijan province, Iran

Sari Suli Persian: ساري سولي
- Village
- Location within Iran
- Coordinates: 38°27′38″N 47°26′20″E
- Country: Iran
- Province: East Azerbaijan
- County: Ahar
- District: Fandoqlu
- Rural District: Naqduz

Population (2016)
  - Total: 414
- Time zone: UTC+3:30 (IRST)

Sari Suli (Persian: ساري سولي) (Note: Also romanized as Sārī Sūlī; also known as Sārīlū) is a village in Naqduz Rural District of Fandoqlu District in Ahar County, East Azerbaijan province, Iran.

== Demographics ==
=== Population ===
At the time of the 2006 National Census, the village's population was 572 in 109 households, when it was in Qeshlaq Rural District of the Central District. The following census in 2011 counted 556 people in 124 households. The 2016 census measured the population of the village as 414 people in 120 households.

In 2018, the rural district was separated from the district in the formation of Fandoqlu District, and Sari Suli was transferred to Naqduz Rural District created in the new district.
