= Zəylik =

Zəylik or Zagllik or Zaghk or Dzaglik may refer to:

- Zəylik, Dashkasan, Azerbaijan
- Zəylik, Kalbajar, Azerbaijan
- Zaglik, Nagorno-Karabakh, also known as Zəylik, a village in the self-proclaimed Republic of Artsakh, de jure in Azerbaijan, in the disputed region of Nagorno-Karabakh
- Zaglik-e Kurbolagh, Iran
- Zaglik-e Olya, Iran
- Zaglik-e Sofla, Iran
