= Ahar rug =

Type of Persian carpet

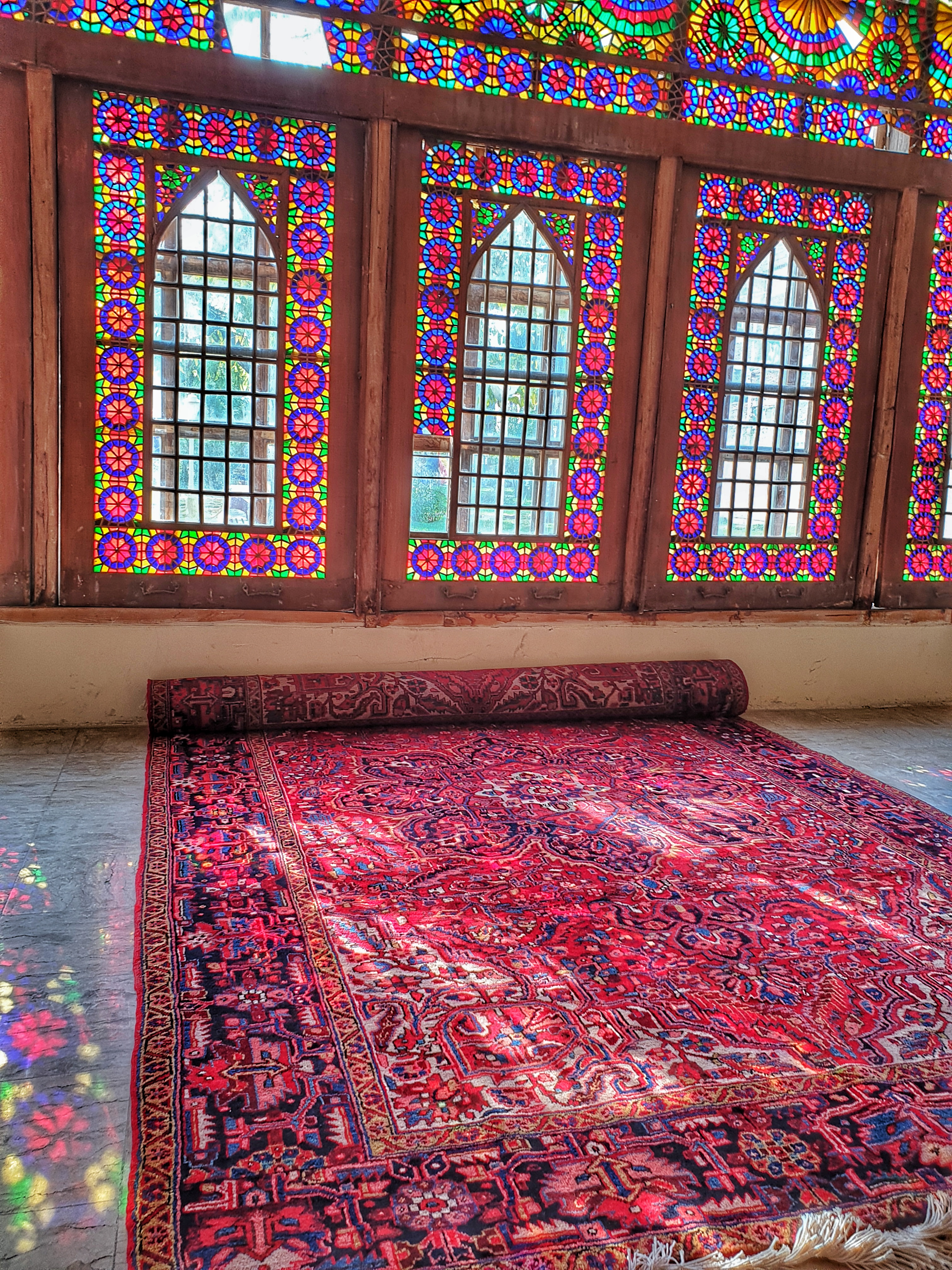
An Ahar rug

The Ahar rug, also known as Ahar carpet, is a type of Persian carpet made in the town of Ahar, located in the town of Ahar County which was the capital of Karadag Khanate in Iran.

The name of the rug references the city and region of origin.

== History ==
Over the last 30 years, Ahar rugs have emerged as a recognizable group in the marketplace, and they are sold in many parts of Iran outside their town of origin.

== Production ==
Ahar carpets are woven by people who live in Ahar county as well as by nomads in the region. They are made in Ahar city and villages including Qunigh, Arpaliq, Cheshme Vazan, GangalAbad, ZandAbad, Galandar, Bohol, Afil, Nagareh koob, Vardin, Qarajeh, Qurchi Kandi, Mazraeh-ye Hajj Abedin, Mazraeh-ye Mazare, Kaqalaq and Kalhur.

== Characteristics ==
The design incorporates a large medallion, and it is geometric with curvilinear elements. Thus, it is characterized as a rectilinear medallion-spandrel design.

An Ahar rug may be recognized by its blue wefts, especially in the medallions. The background is generally some shade of red, brick, or rose, and the large corners, created by the spandrels, are typically ivory-colored.

A standard Ahar rug measures approximately 9 x 12 feet. It is designed with a higher knot count, thought not exceeding that of many carpets with geometric design. The rug has a cotton or wool base with a knot density of 65 symmetrical knots per square inch. The rugs are known for their quality compared to other Persian handmade rugs.

It is a distinctive carpet in the Heriz group of carpets. It is influenced by the Heriz and Tabriz styles.
