= Naqqareh Kub =

Naqqareh Kub or Naqareh Kub (Persian: نقاره كوب) may refer to:

- Naqqareh Kub-e Jadid, East Azerbaijan Province
- Naqqareh Kub-e Qadim, East Azerbaijan Province
- Naqareh Kub, Kermanshah
