= Balli Qeshlaq =

Village in East Azerbaijan province, Iran

Balli Qeshlaq Persian: باللي قشلاق
- Village
- Location within Iran
- Coordinates: 38°29′06″N 47°27′29″E
- Country: Iran
- Province: East Azerbaijan
- County: Ahar
- District: Fandoqlu
- Rural District: Naqduz

Population (2016)
  - Total: 437
- Time zone: UTC+3:30 (IRST)

Balli Qeshlaq (Persian: باللي قشلاق) (Note: Also romanized as Bālī Qeshlāq and Bāllī Qeshlāq; also known as Āt Meyān and Ātmeyān) is a village in Naqduz Rural District of Fandoqlu District in Ahar County, East Azerbaijan province, Iran.

== Demographics ==
=== Population ===
At the time of the 2006 National Census, the village's population was 453 in 100 households, when it was in Qeshlaq Rural District of the Central District. The following census in 2011 counted 465 people in 113 households. The 2016 census measured the population of the village as 437 people in 118 households.

In 2018, the rural district was separated from the district in the formation of Fandoqlu District, and Balli Qeshlaq was transferred to Naqduz Rural District created in the new district.
