= Allu =

Allu may refer to:

== Places ==
- Allu (island), Estonia
- Allu, Ardabil, Iran
- Allu, Ahar, East Azerbaijan Province, Iran
- Alelu, Maragheh, East Azerbaijan Province, Iran

== People ==
- Allu (surname), a Telugu surname in India
- Allu family, an Indian film family
- Allu Tuppurainen (born 1951), Finnish film actor
- Aleksi "Allu" Jalli (born 1992), Finnish professional Counter-Strike player

== Other uses ==
- Alû, spirit in Akkadian and Sumerian mythology

== See also ==
- Alu, Iran (disambiguation)
