= Naqduz =

Village in East Azerbaijan province, Iran

Naqduz Persian: نقدوز
- Village
- Location within Iran
- Coordinates: 38°23′57″N 47°21′55″E
- Country: Iran
- Province: East Azerbaijan
- County: Ahar
- District: Fandoqlu
- Rural District: Naqduz

Population (2016)
  - Total: 459
- Time zone: UTC+3:30 (IRST)

Naqduz (Persian: نقدوز) (Note: Also romanized as Naqdūz; also known as Nīāz) is a village in, and the capital of, Naqduz Rural District in Fandoqlu District of Ahar County, East Azerbaijan province, Iran.

== Demographics ==
=== Population ===
At the time of the 2006 National Census, the village's population was 418 in 90 households, when it was in Qeshlaq Rural District of the Central District. The following census in 2011 counted 485 people in 130 households. The 2016 census measured the population of the village as 459 people in 140 households.

In 2018, the rural district was separated from the district in the formation of Fandoqlu District, and Naqduz was transferred to Naqduz Rural District created in the new district.
