= Qeshlaq-e Jadid =

Qeshlaq-e Jadid قشلاق جديد
- Village
- Location within Iran
- Coordinates: 38°31′21″N 47°29′26″E
- Country: Iran
- Province: East Azerbaijan
- County: Ahar
- Bakhsh: Central
- Rural District: Qeshlaq

Population (2006)
  - Total: 52
- Time zone: UTC+3:30 (IRST)
  - Summer (DST): UTC+4:30 (IRDT)

Qeshlaq-e Jadid (Persian: قشلاق جديد, also Romanized as Qeshlāq-e Jadīd; also known as Owch Āghel and Ūchāghel) is a village in Qeshlaq Rural District, in the Central District of Ahar County, East Azerbaijan Province, Iran. At the 2006 census, its population was 52, in 11 families.
