= Gomishabad =

Gomishabad گميش اباد
- Village
- Location within Iran
- Coordinates: 38°23′00″N 46°54′00″E
- Country: Iran
- Province: East Azerbaijan
- County: Ahar
- Bakhsh: Central
- Rural District: Goyjah Bel

Population (2006)
  - Total: 158
- Time zone: UTC+3:30 (IRST)
  - Summer (DST): UTC+4:30 (IRDT)

Gomishabad (Persian: گميش اباد, romanized: Gomishābād; also known as Gomeshābād, Gomoshābād, Gyumishabad, Gyumishili, and Qāsem ‘Alī Kandī) is a village in Goyjah Bel Rural District, in the Central District of Ahar County, East Azerbaijan Province, Iran. At the 2006 census, its population was 158, in 28 families.
