= Rashtabad =

Rashtabad or Reshtabad (Persian: رشت اباد) may refer to:

- Rashtabad-e Jadid, East Azerbaijan Province
- Rashtabad-e Qadim, East Azerbaijan Province
- Rashtabad, Gilan
- Rashtabad, Zanjan
