= Qeshlaq-e Khiallu =

Qeshlaq-e Khiallu قشلاق خياللو
- Village
- Location within Iran
- Coordinates: 38°26′55″N 47°21′13″E
- Country: Iran
- Province: East Azerbaijan
- County: Ahar
- Bakhsh: Central
- Rural District: Qeshlaq

Population (2006)
  - Total: 44
- Time zone: UTC+3:30 (IRST)
  - Summer (DST): UTC+4:30 (IRDT)

Qeshlaq-e Khiallu (Persian: قشلاق خياللو, also Romanized as Qeshlāq-e Khīāllū; also known as Qeshlāq-e Khīārlū) is a village in Qeshlaq Rural District, in the Central District of Ahar County, East Azerbaijan Province, Iran. At the 2006 census, its population was 44, in 9 families.
