= Yagh Bastlu =

Yagh Bastlu ياغ بستلو
- Village
- Location within Iran
- Coordinates: 38°30′18″N 47°03′05″E
- Country: Iran
- Province: East Azerbaijan
- County: Ahar
- Bakhsh: Central
- Rural District: Owch Hacha

Population (2006)
  - Total: 85
- Time zone: UTC+3:30 (IRST)
  - Summer (DST): UTC+4:30 (IRDT)

Yagh Bastlu (Persian: ياغ بستلو, also Romanized as Yāgh Bastlū; also known as Bā‘bastlū) is a village in Owch Hacha Rural District, in the Central District of Ahar County, East Azerbaijan Province, Iran. At the 2006 census, its population was 85, in 17 families. The village is populated by the Kurdish Chalabianlu tribe.
