= Jaliq =

Jaliq (Persian: جاليق) may refer to:

- Jaliq, Bozkosh
- Jaliq, Qeshlaq
