= Sarajlu =

Sarajlu (Persian: سراجلو) may refer to:

- Sarajlu, Ahar
- Sarajlu, Kaleybar
