= Sutat =

Sutat سوتات
- Village
- Location within Iran
- Coordinates: 38°32′43″N 47°28′21″E
- Country: Iran
- Province: East Azerbaijan
- County: Ahar
- Bakhsh: Central
- Rural District: Vargahan

Population (2006)
  - Total: 176
- Time zone: UTC+3:30 (IRST)
  - Summer (DST): UTC+4:30 (IRDT)

Sutat (Persian: سوتات, romanized: Sūtāt; also known as Sūtūt) is a village in Vargahan Rural District, in the Central District of Ahar County, East Azerbaijan Province, Iran, 935 meters above sea level. At the 2006 census, its population was 176, in 36 families. The terrain around Sūtūt is mainly hilly, but to the southeast it is flat. The highest point nearby is Kūh-e Qezel Āghol, 1,309 meters above sea level, 1.9 km west of Sūtūt. Around Sūtūt it is quite densely populated, with 56 inhabitants per square kilometer. The nearest major community is Dūst Beyglū, 5.5 km east of Sūtūt. The area around Sūtūt consists mainly of grasslands.

Mediterranean climate prevails in the area. The average annual temperature in the neighborhood is 16 °C . The warmest month is August, when the average temperature is 30 °C, and the coldest is January, with 0 °C. Average annual rainfall is 884 millimeters. The wettest month is November, with an average of 155 mm of precipitation, and the driest is August, with 8 mm of precipitation.
