= Barmas =

Barmas برمس
- Village
- Location within Iran
- Coordinates: 38°29′01″N 46°54′44″E
- Country: Iran
- Province: East Azerbaijan
- County: Ahar
- Bakhsh: Central
- Rural District: Azghan

Population (2006)
  - Total: 215
- Time zone: UTC+3:30 (IRST)
  - Summer (DST): UTC+4:30 (IRDT)

Barmas (Persian: برمس, also Romanized as Barmes; also known as Barmesh, Bārmīz, and Byrmys) is a village in Azghan Rural District, in the Central District of Ahar County, East Azerbaijan province, Iran. At the 2006 census, its population was 215, in 49 families.

== Barmas ==
Barmas (Persian: برماس) is used as a surname in Iran.
