= Javan Sheykh =

Javan Sheykh جوان شيخ
- Village
- Location within Iran
- Coordinates: 38°36′44″N 47°01′15″E
- Country: Iran
- Province: East Azerbaijan
- County: Ahar
- Bakhsh: Central
- Rural District: Owch Hacha

Population (2006)
  - Total: 62
- Time zone: UTC+3:30 (IRST)
  - Summer (DST): UTC+4:30 (IRDT)

Javan Sheykh (Persian: جوان شيخ, also Romanized as Javān Sheykh) is a village in Owch Hacha Rural District, in the Central District of Ahar County, East Azerbaijan Province, Iran. At the 2006 census, its population was 62, in 15 families.
