= Galizeh =

Galizeh گليزه
- Village
- Location within Iran
- Coordinates: 38°33′30″N 47°18′51″E
- Country: Iran
- Province: East Azerbaijan
- County: Ahar
- Bakhsh: Central
- Rural District: Qeshlaq

Population (2006)
  - Total: 216
- Time zone: UTC+3:30 (IRST)
  - Summer (DST): UTC+4:30 (IRDT)

Galizeh (Persian: گليزه, also Romanized as Galīzeh and Golīzeh) is a village in Qeshlaq Rural District, in the Central District of Ahar County, East Azerbaijan Province, Iran. At the 2006 census, its population was 216, in 40 families.
