= Allu, Ahar =

Village in East Azerbaijan province, Iran

Allu Persian: اللو
- Village
- Location within Iran
- Coordinates: 38°21′28″N 47°20′06″E
- Country: Iran
- Province: East Azerbaijan
- County: Ahar
- District: Fandoqlu
- Rural District: Naqduz

Population (2016)
  - Total: 789
- Time zone: UTC+3:30 (IRST)

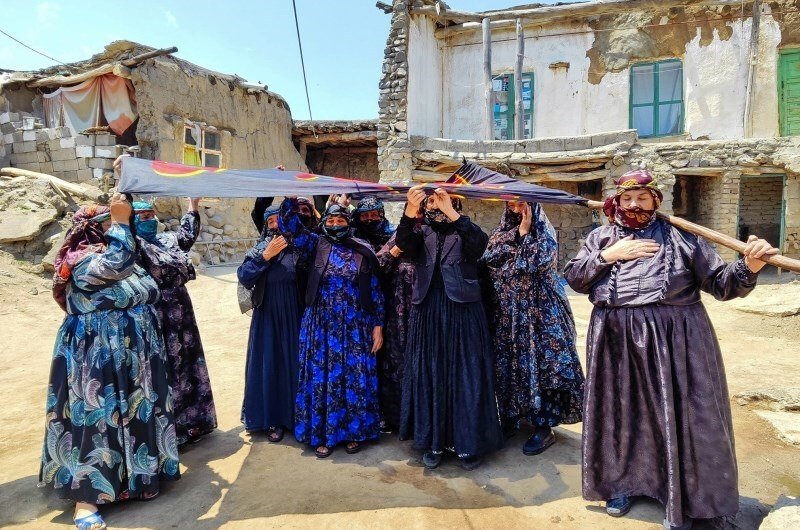
A group of women in Allu (2024)

Allu (Persian: اللو) (Note: Also romanized as Āllū; also known as Ahl) is a village in Naqduz Rural District of Fandoqlu District in Ahar County, East Azerbaijan province, Iran.

== Demographics ==
=== Population ===
At the time of the 2006 National Census, the village's population was 736 in 170 households, when it was in Qeshlaq Rural District of the Central District. The following census in 2011 counted 880 people in 231 households. The 2016 census measured the population of the village as 789 people in 227 households.

In 2018, the rural district was separated from the district in the formation of Fandoqlu District, and Allu was transferred to Naqduz Rural District created in the new district.
