= Sheykh Qeshlaq-e Olya =

Sheykh Qeshlaq-e Olya شيخ قشلاق عليا
- Village
- Location within Iran
- Coordinates: 38°26′21″N 47°25′40″E
- Country: Iran
- Province: East Azerbaijan
- County: Ahar
- Bakhsh: Central
- Rural District: Qeshlaq

Population (2006)
  - Total: 145
- Time zone: UTC+3:30 (IRST)
  - Summer (DST): UTC+4:30 (IRDT)

Sheykh Qeshlaq-e Olya (Persian: شيخ قشلاق عليا, also Romanized as Sheykh Qeshlāq-e ‘Olyā and Sheykhqeshlāq-e ‘Olyā) is a village in Qeshlaq Rural District, in the Central District of Ahar County, East Azerbaijan Province, Iran. At the 2006 census, its population was 145, in 28 families.
