= Qarah Burun =

Qarah Burun قره بورون
- Village
- Location within Iran
- Coordinates: 38°27′25″N 47°08′38″E
- Country: Iran
- Province: East Azerbaijan
- County: Ahar
- Bakhsh: Central
- Rural District: Bozkosh

Population (2006)
  - Total: 40
- Time zone: UTC+3:30 (IRST)
  - Summer (DST): UTC+4:30 (IRDT)

Qarah Burun (Persian: قره بورون, also Romanized as Qarah Būrūn; also known as Qarah Borūn and Qareh Borūn) is a village in Bozkosh Rural District, in the Central District of Ahar County, East Azerbaijan Province, Iran. At the 2006 census, its population was 40, in 8 families.
