= Qeshlaq-e Qalehjiq =

Qeshlaq-e Qalehjiq قشلاق قلعه جيق
- Village
- Location within Iran
- Coordinates: 38°34′00″N 47°27′00″E
- Country: Iran
- Province: East Azerbaijan
- County: Ahar
- Bakhsh: Central
- Rural District: Vargahan

Population (2006)
  - Total: 46
- Time zone: UTC+3:30 (IRST)
  - Summer (DST): UTC+4:30 (IRDT)

Qeshlaq-e Qalehjiq (Persian: قشلاق قلعه جيق, also Romanized as Qeshlāq-e Qal‘ehjīq) is a village in Vargahan Rural District, in the Central District of Ahar County, East Azerbaijan Province, Iran. At the 2006 census, its population was 46, in 11 families.
