= Chol Qeshlaqi =

Village in East Azerbaijan province, Iran

Chol Qeshlaqi Persian: چل قشلاقي
- Village
- Location within Iran
- Coordinates: 38°30′37″N 47°19′05″E
- Country: Iran
- Province: East Azerbaijan
- County: Ahar
- District: Fandoqlu
- Rural District: Qeshlaq

Population (2016)
  - Total: 844
- Time zone: UTC+3:30 (IRST)

Chol Qeshlaqi (Persian: چل قشلاقي) (Note: Also romanized as Chol Qeshlāqī; also known as Chol Qeshlāq, Chowl Qeshlāqī, Chūl Qeshlāq, and Chūl Qeshlāqī) is a village in Qeshlaq Rural District of Fandoqlu District in Ahar County, East Azerbaijan province, Iran.

== Demographics ==
=== Population ===
At the time of the 2006 National Census, the village's population was 973 in 197 households, when it was in the Central District. The following census in 2011 counted 879 people in 243 households. The 2016 census measured the population of the village as 844 people in 273 households.

In 2018, the rural district was separated from the district in the formation of Fandoqlu District.
