= Dughan =

Dughan دوغان
- Village
- Location within Iran
- Coordinates: 38°25′38″N 47°12′48″E
- Country: Iran
- Province: East Azerbaijan
- County: Ahar
- Bakhsh: Central
- Rural District: Qeshlaq

Population (2006)
  - Total: 106
- Time zone: UTC+3:30 (IRST)
  - Summer (DST): UTC+4:30 (IRDT)

Dughan (Persian: دوغان, also Romanized as Dūghān) is a village in Qeshlaq Rural District, in the Central District of Ahar County, East Azerbaijan Province, Iran. At the 2006 census, its population was 106, in 23 families.
