= Shah Moradlu =

Shah Moradlu شاه مرادلو
- Village
- Location within Iran
- Coordinates: 38°31′05″N 47°25′09″E
- Country: Iran
- Province: East Azerbaijan
- County: Ahar
- Bakhsh: Central
- Rural District: Qeshlaq

Population (2006)
  - Total: 53
- Time zone: UTC+3:30 (IRST)
  - Summer (DST): UTC+4:30 (IRDT)

Shah Moradlu (Persian: شاه مرادلو, also Romanized as Shāh Morādlū; also known as Shāh Mard‘alī and Shāh Morād) is a village in Qeshlaq Rural District, in the Central District of Ahar County, East Azerbaijan Province, Iran. At the 2006 census, its population was 53, in 10 families.
