= Zanjir Bolagh =

Zanjir Bolagh زنجيربلاغ
- Village
- Location within Iran
- Coordinates: 38°24′56″N 46°54′29″E
- Country: Iran
- Province: East Azerbaijan
- County: Ahar
- Bakhsh: Central
- Rural District: Goyjah Bel

Population (2006)
  - Total: 186
- Time zone: UTC+3:30 (IRST)
  - Summer (DST): UTC+4:30 (IRDT)

Zanjir Bolagh (Persian: زنجيربلاغ, also Romanized as Zanjīr Bolāgh) is a village in Goyjah Bel Rural District, in the Central District of Ahar County, East Azerbaijan Province, Iran. At the 2006 census, its population was 186, in 44 families.
