= Moghar =

Moghar مغار
- Village
- Location within Iran
- Coordinates: 38°33′00″N 47°26′00″E
- Country: Iran
- Province: East Azerbaijan
- County: Ahar
- Bakhsh: Central
- Rural District: Vargahan

Population (2006)
  - Total: 110
- Time zone: UTC+3:30 (IRST)
  - Summer (DST): UTC+4:30 (IRDT)

Moghar (Persian: مغار, also Romanized as Moghār) is a village in Vargahan Rural District, in the Central District of Ahar County, East Azerbaijan Province, Iran. At the 2006 census, its population was 110, in 23 families.
