= Dizbin =

Dizbin ديزبين
- Village
- Location within Iran
- Coordinates: 38°26′24″N 47°01′22″E
- Country: Iran
- Province: East Azerbaijan
- County: Ahar
- Bakhsh: Central
- Rural District: Goyjah Bel

Population (2006)
  - Total: 265
- Time zone: UTC+3:30 (IRST)
  - Summer (DST): UTC+4:30 (IRDT)

Dizbin (Persian: ديزبين, romanized: Dīzbīn) is a village in Goyjah Bel Rural District, in the Central District of Ahar County, East Azerbaijan Province, Iran. At the 2006 census, its population was 265, in 63 families.
