= Shureh Nab =

Shureh Nab شوره ناب
- Village
- Location within Iran
- Coordinates: 38°38′21″N 47°25′34″E
- Country: Iran
- Province: East Azerbaijan
- County: Ahar
- Bakhsh: Central
- Rural District: Vargahan

Population (2006)
  - Total: 77
- Time zone: UTC+3:30 (IRST)
  - Summer (DST): UTC+4:30 (IRDT)

Shureh Nab (Persian: شوره ناب, romanized: Shūreh Nāb; also known as Shūrlū) is a village in Vargahan Rural District, in the Central District of Ahar County, East Azerbaijan Province, Iran. At the 2006 census, its population was 77, in 17 families.
