= Shahverdi =

Village in East Azerbaijan province, Iran

Shahverdi Persian: شاه وردي
- Village
- Location within Iran
- Coordinates: 38°25′09″N 47°14′55″E
- Country: Iran
- Province: East Azerbaijan
- County: Ahar
- District: Fandoqlu
- Rural District: Qeshlaq

Population (2016)
  - Total: 614
- Time zone: UTC+3:30 (IRST)

Shahverdi (Persian: شاه وردي) (Note: Also romanized as Shāhverdī; also known as Qeshlāq, Qeshlāq-e Shāhverdī, Qeshlāq-e Shāverdī, Qishlāq, and Shāverdī) is a village in Qeshlaq Rural District of Fandoqlu District in Ahar County, East Azerbaijan province, Iran.

== Demographics ==
=== Population ===
At the time of the 2006 National Census, the village's population was 544 in 119 households, when it was in the Central District. The following census in 2011 counted 671 people in 174 households. The 2016 census measured the population of the village as 614 people in 175 households.

In 2018, the rural district was separated from the district in the formation of Fandoqlu District.
