= Yayijilu =

Yayijilu يايجيلو
- Village
- Location within Iran
- Coordinates: 38°24′26″N 46°52′39″E
- Country: Iran
- Province: East Azerbaijan
- County: Ahar
- Bakhsh: Central
- Rural District: Goyjah Bel

Population (2006)
  - Total: 151
- Time zone: UTC+3:30 (IRST)
  - Summer (DST): UTC+4:30 (IRDT)

Yayijilu (Persian: يايجيلو, also Romanized as Yāyjīlū; also known as Yadzhili, Yājelī, Yājelū, Yajili, Yājlū, and Yāychelī) is a village in Goyjah Bel Rural District, in the Central District of Ahar County, East Azerbaijan Province, Iran. At the 2006 census, its population was 151, in 26 families.
