= Kureh Daraq =

Kureh Daraq كوره درق
- Village
- Location within Iran
- Coordinates: 38°24′00″N 46°49′57″E
- Country: Iran
- Province: East Azerbaijan
- County: Ahar
- Bakhsh: Central
- Rural District: Goyjah Bel

Population (2006)
  - Total: 111
- Time zone: UTC+3:30 (IRST)
  - Summer (DST): UTC+4:30 (IRDT)

Kureh Daraq (Persian: كوره درق, also Romanized as Kūreh Daraq; also known as Kūreh Dazaq) is a village in Goyjah Bel Rural District, in the Central District of Ahar County, East Azerbaijan Province, Iran. At the 2006 census, its population was 111, in 23 families.
