= Andab =

Andab (Persian: انداب) may refer to:

- Andab-e Jadid
- Andab-e Qadim
