= Mostafa Chay =

Mostafa Chay مصطفي چاي
- Village
- Location within Iran
- Coordinates: 38°34′49″N 47°01′53″E
- Country: Iran
- Province: East Azerbaijan
- County: Ahar
- Bakhsh: Central
- Rural District: Owch Hacha

Population (2006)
  - Total: 67
- Time zone: UTC+3:30 (IRST)
  - Summer (DST): UTC+4:30 (IRDT)

Mostafa Chay (Persian: مصطفي چاي, also Romanized as Moşţafá Chāy; also known as Moşţafá Chā’ī) is a village in Owch Hacha Rural District, in the Central District of Ahar County, East Azerbaijan Province, Iran. At the 2006 census, its population was 67, in 19 families.
