= Pesteh Beyglu =

Pesteh Beyglu پسته بيگ لو
- Village
- Location within Iran
- Coordinates: 38°30′57″N 47°05′35″E
- Country: Iran
- Province: East Azerbaijan
- County: Ahar
- Bakhsh: Central
- Rural District: Owch Hacha

Population (2006)
  - Total: 208
- Time zone: UTC+3:30 (IRST)
  - Summer (DST): UTC+4:30 (IRDT)

Pesteh Beyglu (Persian: پسته بيگ لو, also Romanized as Pesteh Beyglū; also known as Pasteh Beyg and Pesteh Beyk) is a village in Owch Hacha Rural District, in the Central District of Ahar County, East Azerbaijan Province, Iran. At the 2006 census, its population was 208, in 48 families.
