= Yavar Kandi =

Yavar Kandi ياوركندي
- Village
- Location within Iran
- Coordinates: 38°22′49″N 47°13′09″E
- Country: Iran
- Province: East Azerbaijan
- County: Ahar
- Bakhsh: Central
- Rural District: Qeshlaq

Population (2006)
  - Total: 362
- Time zone: UTC+3:30 (IRST)
  - Summer (DST): UTC+4:30 (IRDT)

Yavar Kandi (Persian: ياوركندي, also Romanized as Yāvar Kandī) is a village in Qeshlaq Rural District, in the Central District of Ahar County, East Azerbaijan Province, Iran. At the 2006 census, its population was 362, in 82 families.
