= Alpavit =

Alpavit الپاويت
- Village
- Location within Iran
- Coordinates: 38°26′13″N 47°09′42″E
- Country: Iran
- Province: East Azerbaijan
- County: Ahar
- Bakhsh: Central
- Rural District: Bozkosh

Population (2006)
  - Total: 122
- Time zone: UTC+3:30 (IRST)
  - Summer (DST): UTC+4:30 (IRDT)

Alpavit (Persian: الپاويت, also Romanized as Ālpāvīt; also known as Ālpāvet) is a village in Bozkosh Rural District, in the Central District of Ahar County, East Azerbaijan Province, Iran. At the 2006 census, its population was 122, in 21 families.

== Name ==
According to Vladimir Minorsky, the name of this village is derived from the Mongolian word alpā'ut, referring to "a privileged class".
