= Qeshlaq-e Hajj Owghlu =

Qeshlaq-e Hajj Owghlu قشلاق حاج اوغلو
- Village
- Location within Iran
- Coordinates: 38°32′01″N 47°24′40″E
- Country: Iran
- Province: East Azerbaijan
- County: Ahar
- Bakhsh: Central
- Rural District: Qeshlaq

Population (2006)
  - Total: 179
- Time zone: UTC+3:30 (IRST)
  - Summer (DST): UTC+4:30 (IRDT)

Qeshlaq-e Hajj Owghlu (Persian: قشلاق حاج اوغلو, also Romanized as Qeshlāq-e Ḩājj Owghlū; also known as Ḩājīoghlū Qeshlāqi) is a village in Qeshlaq Rural District, in the Central District of Ahar County, East Azerbaijan Province, Iran. At the 2006 census, its population was 179, in 39 families.
