= Seyyedli (38°24′ N 47°13′ E), Ahar =

Seyyedli سيدلي
- Village
- Location within Iran
- Coordinates: 38°23′44″N 47°12′40″E
- Country: Iran
- Province: East Azerbaijan
- County: Ahar
- Bakhsh: Central
- Rural District: Qeshlaq

Population (2006)
  - Total: 144
- Time zone: UTC+3:30 (IRST)
  - Summer (DST): UTC+4:30 (IRDT)

Seyyedli (Persian: سيدلي, also Romanized as Seyyedlī) is a village in Qeshlaq Rural District, in the Central District of Ahar County, East Azerbaijan Province, Iran. At the 2006 census, its population was 144, in 34 families.
