= Oshdalaq =

Oshdalaq اشدلق
- Village
- Location within Iran
- Coordinates: 38°27′15″N 46°58′55″E
- Country: Iran
- Province: East Azerbaijan
- County: Ahar
- Bakhsh: Central
- Rural District: Goyjah Bel

Population (2006)
  - Total: 29
- Time zone: UTC+3:30 (IRST)
  - Summer (DST): UTC+4:30 (IRDT)

Oshdalaq (Persian: اشدلق; also known as Uchky ‘Uliya, Ūshdelaq, Ushtula, and Uzhkyulya) is a village in Goyjah Bel Rural District, in the Central District of Ahar County, East Azerbaijan Province, Iran. At the 2006 census, its population was 29, in 9 families.
