= Darreh Qeshlaq-e Sofla =

Darreh Qeshlaq-e Sofla دره قشلاق سفلي
- Village
- Country: Iran
- Province: East Azerbaijan
- County: Ahar
- Bakhsh: Central
- Rural District: Vargahan

Population (2006)
  - Total: 66
- Time zone: UTC+3:30 (IRST)
  - Summer (DST): UTC+4:30 (IRDT)

Darreh Qeshlaq-e Sofla (Persian: دره قشلاق سفلي, romanized: Darreh Qeshlāq-e Soflá) is a village in Vargahan Rural District, in the Central District of Ahar County, East Azerbaijan Province, Iran. At the 2006 census, its population was 66, in 15 families.
