= Sari Yarqan =

Sari Yarqan ساري يارقان
- Village
- Location within Iran
- Coordinates: 38°25′38″N 46°46′43″E
- Country: Iran
- Province: East Azerbaijan
- County: Ahar
- Bakhsh: Central
- Rural District: Goyjah Bel

Population (2006)
  - Total: 155
- Time zone: UTC+3:30 (IRST)
  - Summer (DST): UTC+4:30 (IRDT)

Sari Yarqan (Persian: ساري يارقان, also Romanized as Sārī Yārqān; also known as Sari Yarghān, Sārī Yārīqān, Sārī Yārreqān, Saryargan, and Ser-i-Argan) is a village in Goyjah Bel Rural District, in the Central District of Ahar County, East Azerbaijan Province, Iran. As of the 2006 census, its population was 155, spread across 33 families.
