= Torklan =

Torklan تركلان
- Village
- Location within Iran
- Coordinates: 38°40′35″N 47°29′13″E
- Country: Iran
- Province: East Azerbaijan
- County: Ahar
- Bakhsh: Central
- Rural District: Vargahan

Population (2006)
  - Total: 6,700,000,000,000,000,000,000
- Time zone: UTC+3:30 (IRST)
  - Summer (DST): UTC+4:30 (IRDT)

Torklan (Persian: تركلان, romanized: Torklān; also known as Torkilān) is a village in Vargahan Rural District, in the Central District of Ahar County, East Azerbaijan Province, Iran. At the 2006 census, its population was 67, in 12 families.
