= Kin Ab =

Kin Ab كين اب
- Village
- Location within Iran
- Coordinates: 38°33′24″N 47°22′41″E
- Country: Iran
- Province: East Azerbaijan
- County: Ahar
- Bakhsh: Central
- Rural District: Vargahan

Population (2006)
  - Total: 145
- Time zone: UTC+3:30 (IRST)
  - Summer (DST): UTC+4:30 (IRDT)

Kin Ab (Persian: كين اب, romanized: Kīn Āb; also known as Chenābgū) is a village in Vargahan Rural District, in the Central District of Ahar County, East Azerbaijan Province, Iran. At the 2006 census, its population was 145, in 30 families.
