= Zang Molk =

Zang Molk زنگ ملك
- Village
- Location within Iran
- Coordinates: 38°33′32″N 46°53′52″E
- Country: Iran
- Province: East Azerbaijan
- County: Ahar
- Bakhsh: Central
- Rural District: Azghan

Population (2006)
  - Total: 17
- Time zone: UTC+3:30 (IRST)
  - Summer (DST): UTC+4:30 (IRDT)

Zang Molk (Persian: زنگ ملك; also known as Zangamurt, Zang Murt, and Zank Molk) is a village in Azghan Rural District, in the Central District of Ahar County, East Azerbaijan Province, Iran. At the 2006 census, its population was 17, in 6 families.
