= Naqduz Rural District =

Rural district in East Azerbaijan province, Iran

Naqduz Rural District Persian: دهستان نقدوز
- Rural District
- Location within Iran
- Coordinates: 38°27′N 47°24′E
- Country: Iran
- Province: East Azerbaijan
- County: Ahar
- District: Fandoqlu
- Established: 2018
- Capital: Naqduz
- Time zone: UTC+3:30 (IRST)

Naqduz Rural District (Persian: دهستان نقدوز) is in Fandoqlu District of Ahar County, East Azerbaijan province, Iran. Its capital is the village of Naqduz, whose population at the time of the 2016 National Census was 459 in 140 households.

== History ==
In 2018, Qeshlaq Rural District was separated from the Central District in the formation of Fandoqlu District, and Naqduz Rural District was created in the new district.

== Other villages in the rural district ==
- Allu
- Balli Qeshlaq
- Sari Suli
