= Zardkhaneh =

Zardkhaneh زردخانه
- Village
- Location within Iran
- Coordinates: 38°35′14″N 47°16′54″E
- Country: Iran
- Province: East Azerbaijan
- County: Ahar
- Bakhsh: Central
- Rural District: Vargahan

Population (2006)
  - Total: 125
- Time zone: UTC+3:30 (IRST)
  - Summer (DST): UTC+4:30 (IRDT)

Zardkhaneh (Persian: زردخانه, romanized: Zardkhāneh; also known as Zardeh Khāneh) is a village in Vargahan Rural District, in the Central District of Ahar County, East Azerbaijan Province, Iran. At the 2006 census, its total population was 125 persons amongst 26 families.
