= Qeshlaq-e Kanehlu =

Qeshlaq-e Kanehlu قشلاق كنه لو
- Village
- Country: Iran
- Province: East Azerbaijan
- County: Ahar
- Bakhsh: Central
- Rural District: Vargahan

Population (2006)
  - Total: 30
- Time zone: UTC+3:30 (IRST)
  - Summer (DST): UTC+4:30 (IRDT)

Qeshlaq-e Kanehlu (Persian: قشلاق كنه لو, also Romanized as Qeshlāq-e Kanehlū) is a village in Vargahan Rural District, in the Central District of Ahar County, East Azerbaijan Province, Iran. At the 2006 census, its population was 30, in 7 families.
