= Quri Gol =

Quri Gol قوري گل
- Village
- Location within Iran
- Coordinates: 38°36′08″N 47°14′59″E
- Country: Iran
- Province: East Azerbaijan
- County: Ahar
- Bakhsh: Central
- Rural District: Vargahan

Population (2006)
  - Total: 26
- Time zone: UTC+3:30 (IRST)
  - Summer (DST): UTC+4:30 (IRDT)

Quri Gol (Persian: قوري گل, romanized: Qūrī Gol) is a village in Vargahan Rural District, in the Central District of Ahar County, East Azerbaijan Province, Iran. At the 2006 census, its population was 26, in 8 families.
