= Kord Lar =

Kord Lar or Kordlar (Persian: كردلر) may refer to:

- Kord Lar, Ardabil
- Kordlar, Ahar, East Azerbaijan Province
- Kordlar-e Tarancheh, Ahar County, East Azerbaijan Province
- Kordlar, Kaleybar, East Azerbaijan Province
- Kordlar, Osku, East Azerbaijan Province
- Kordlar, Tabriz, East Azerbaijan Province
- Kordlar, West Azerbaijan
