= Mordeh Katan =

Mordeh Katan مرده كتان
- Village
- Location within Iran
- Coordinates: 38°25′54″N 47°04′47″E
- Country: Iran
- Province: East Azerbaijan
- County: Ahar
- Bakhsh: Central
- Rural District: Bozkosh

Population (2006)
  - Total: 101
- Time zone: UTC+3:30 (IRST)
  - Summer (DST): UTC+4:30 (IRDT)

Mordeh Katan (Persian: مرده كتان, also Romanized as Mordeh Katān) is a village in Bozkosh Rural District, in the Central District of Ahar County, East Azerbaijan Province, Iran. At the 2006 census, its population was 101, in 24 families.
