= Kord Ahmad =

Kord Ahmad (Persian: كرداحمد) may refer to:

- Kord Ahmad-e Olya
- Kord Ahmad-e Sofla
