= Qeshlaq-e Najaf Khanlu =

Qeshlaq-e Najaf Khanlu قشلاق نجف خانلو
- Village
- Location within Iran
- Coordinates: 38°28′50″N 47°25′39″E
- Country: Iran
- Province: East Azerbaijan
- County: Ahar
- Bakhsh: Central
- Rural District: Qeshlaq

Population (2006)
  - Total: 74
- Time zone: UTC+3:30 (IRST)
  - Summer (DST): UTC+4:30 (IRDT)

Qeshlaq-e Najaf Khanlu (Persian: قشلاق نجف خانلو, also Romanized as Qeshlāq-e Najaf Khānlū; also known as Najaf Khānlū) is a village in Qeshlaq Rural District, in the Central District of Ahar County, East Azerbaijan Province, Iran. At the 2006 census, its population was 74, in 13 families.
