= Daghalian =

Daghalian or Daghlian or Daghliyan (Persian: دغليان) may refer to:

- Daghalian-e Bala
- Daghalian-e Pain
- Harry Daghlian
