= Alireza Chay =

Alireza Chay عليرضاچاي
- Village
- Location within Iran
- Coordinates: 38°33′23″N 46°58′39″E
- Country: Iran
- Province: East Azerbaijan
- County: Ahar
- Bakhsh: Central
- Rural District: Azghan

Population (2006)
  - Total: 269
- Time zone: UTC+3:30 (IRST)
  - Summer (DST): UTC+4:30 (IRDT)

Alireza Chay (Persian: عليرضاچاي, also Romanized as Alīreẕā Chāy; also known as ‘Alīreẕā Chā'ī) is a village in Azghan Rural District, in the Central District of Ahar County, East Azerbaijan Province, Iran. At the 2006 census, its population was 269, in 41 families.
