= Efil =

Village in East Azerbaijan province, Iran

Efil Persian: افيل
- Village
- Location within Iran
- Coordinates: 38°22′00″N 47°18′39″E
- Country: Iran
- Province: East Azerbaijan
- County: Ahar
- District: Fandoqlu
- Rural District: Qeshlaq

Population (2016)
  - Total: 1,733
- Time zone: UTC+3:30 (IRST)

Efil (Persian: افيل) (Note: Also romanized as Efīl) is a village in Qeshlaq Rural District of Fandoqlu District in Ahar County, East Azerbaijan province, Iran. It is quite isolated, with the nearest major airport 116 km away.

== Demographics ==
=== Population ===
At the time of the 2006 National Census, the village's population was 1,639 in 376 households, when it was in the Central District. The following census in 2011 counted 1,743 people in 462 households. The 2016 census measured the population of the village as 1,733 people in 502 households. It was the most populous village in its rural district.

In 2018, the rural district was separated from the district in the formation of Fandoqlu District.

== Climate ==
Efil has a continental Mediterranean climate, with average summer high temperatures of 33 °C, and average winter lows of -4 °C. There is a large range of rainfall, with a wet period in April (52.3mm of rain) and a dry period in August (2.5mm of rain).
