= Pireh Yusefan =

Pireh Yusefan پيره يوسفيان
- Village
- Location within Iran
- Coordinates: 38°25′06″N 46°55′48″E
- Country: Iran
- Province: East Azerbaijan
- County: Ahar
- Bakhsh: Central
- Rural District: Goyjah Bel

Population (2006)
  - Total: 186
- Time zone: UTC+3:30 (IRST)
  - Summer (DST): UTC+4:30 (IRDT)

Pireh Yusefan (Persian: پيره يوسفيان, also Romanized as Pīreh Yūsefān; also known as Bareh Yūsofān, Baresfān, Barreh Yūsofān, Pereh Yūsofān, and Pirasuvar) is a village in Goyjah Bel Rural District, in the Central District of Ahar County, East Azerbaijan Province, Iran. At the 2006 census, its population was 186, in 35 families.
