= Damir Tappeh =

Damir Tappeh دميرتپه
- Village
- Location within Iran
- Coordinates: 38°28′01″N 47°24′31″E
- Country: Iran
- Province: East Azerbaijan
- County: Ahar
- Bakhsh: Central
- Rural District: Qeshlaq

Population (2006)
  - Total: 124
- Time zone: UTC+3:30 (IRST)
  - Summer (DST): UTC+4:30 (IRDT)

Damir Tappeh (Persian: دميرتپه, also Romanized as Damīr Tappeh) is a village in Qeshlaq Rural District, in the Central District of Ahar County, East Azerbaijan Province, Iran. At the 2006 census, its population was 124, in 25 families.
