= Ilkadeh =

Ilkadeh ايلكده
- Village
- Location within Iran
- Coordinates: 38°22′00″N 47°02′00″E
- Country: Iran
- Province: East Azerbaijan
- County: Ahar
- Bakhsh: Central
- Rural District: Goyjah Bel

Population (2006)
  - Total: 52
- Time zone: UTC+3:30 (IRST)
  - Summer (DST): UTC+4:30 (IRDT)

Ilkadeh (Persian: ايلكده, romanized: Īlkadeh) is a village in Goyjah Bel Rural District, in the Central District of Ahar County, East Azerbaijan Province, Iran. At the 2006 census, its population was 52, in 10 families.
