= Daylar =

Village in East Azerbaijan province, Iran

Daylar Persian: دايلار
- Village
- Location within Iran
- Coordinates: 38°26′36″N 46°54′06″E
- Country: Iran
- Province: East Azerbaijan
- County: Ahar
- District: Central
- Rural District: Goyjah Bel

Population (2016)
  - Total: 384
- Time zone: UTC+3:30 (IRST)

Daylar (Persian: دايلار) (Note: Also romanized as Dāylār) is a village in Goyjah Bel Rural District of the Central District in Ahar County, East Azerbaijan province, Iran.

== Demographics ==
=== Population ===
At the time of the 2006 National Census, the village's population was 473 in 91 households. The following census in 2011 counted 378 people in 90 households. The 2016 census measured the population of the village as 384 people in 103 households.
