= Mollalar-e Mohammadreza Kandi =

Mollalar-e Mohammadreza Kandi ملالارمحمدرضاكندي
- Village
- Location within Iran
- Coordinates: 38°25′51″N 46°50′03″E
- Country: Iran
- Province: East Azerbaijan
- County: Ahar
- Bakhsh: Central
- Rural District: Goyjah Bel

Population (2006)
  - Total: 27
- Time zone: UTC+3:30 (IRST)
  - Summer (DST): UTC+4:30 (IRDT)

Mollalar-e Mohammadreza Kandi (Persian: ملالارمحمدرضاكندي, also Romanized as Mollālār-e Moḩammadreẕā Kandī; also known as Mollālar) is a village in Goyjah Bel Rural District, in the Central District of Ahar County, East Azerbaijan Province, Iran. At the 2006 census, its population was 27, in 4 families.
