= Anbaq-e Olya =

Anbaq-e Bala انباق عليا
- Village
- Location within Iran
- Coordinates: 38°30′20″N 47°15′09″E
- Country: Iran
- Province: East Azerbaijan
- County: Ahar
- Bakhsh: Central
- Rural District: Qeshlaq

Population (2006)
  - Total: 19
- Time zone: UTC+3:30 (IRST)
  - Summer (DST): UTC+4:30 (IRDT)

Anbaq-e Bala (Persian: انباق عليا, also Romanized as Anbāq-e ‘Olyā; also known as Anbāq-e Qadīm) is a village in Qeshlaq Rural District, in the Central District of Ahar County, East Azerbaijan Province, Iran. At the 2006 census, its population was 19, in 5 families.
