= Zaglik-e Kurbolagh =

Zaglik-e Kurbolagh زگليك كوربلاغ
- Village
- Location within Iran
- Coordinates: 38°25′42″N 47°20′53″E
- Country: Iran
- Province: East Azerbaijan
- County: Ahar
- Bakhsh: Central
- Rural District: Qeshlaq

Population (2006)
  - Total: 223
- Time zone: UTC+3:30 (IRST)
  - Summer (DST): UTC+4:30 (IRDT)

Zaglik-e Kurbolagh (Persian: زگليك كوربلاغ, also Romanized as Zaglīk-e Kūrbolāgh; also known as Zaklak-e Kūr Bolāgh) is a village in Qeshlaq Rural District, in the Central District of Ahar County, East Azerbaijan Province, Iran. At the 2006 census, its population was 223, in 40 families.
