= Anjerd =

Village in East Azerbaijan province, Iran

Anjerd Persian: انجرد
- Village
- Location within Iran
- Coordinates: 38°39′08″N 46°54′06″E
- Country: Iran
- Province: East Azerbaijan
- County: Ahar
- District: Central
- Rural District: Owch Hacha

Population (2016)
  - Total: 366
- Time zone: UTC+3:30 (IRST)

Anjerd (Persian: انجرد) (Note: Also romanized as Enjerd; also known as Anjar, Anjīr, and Engert) is a village in Owch Hacha Rural District of the Central District in Ahar County, East Azerbaijan province, Iran.

== Demographics ==
=== Population ===
At the time of the 2006 National Census, the village's population was 568 in 104 households. The following census in 2011 counted 631 people in 114 households. The 2016 census measured the population of the village as 366 people in 101 households.
