= Sholeh Boran =

Village in East Azerbaijan province, Iran

Sholeh Boran Persian: شله بران
- Village
- Location within Iran
- Coordinates: 38°29′10″N 47°06′03″E
- Country: Iran
- Province: East Azerbaijan
- County: Ahar
- District: Central
- Rural District: Bozkosh

Population (2016)
  - Total: 675
- Time zone: UTC+3:30 (IRST)

Sholeh Boran (Persian: شله بران) (Note: Also romanized as Sholeh Borān and Sholehborān; also known as Shīlīleh) is a village in Bozkosh Rural District of the Central District in Ahar County, East Azerbaijan province, Iran.

== Demographics ==
=== Population ===
At the time of the 2006 National Census, the village's population was 583 in 103 households. The following census in 2011 counted 909 people in 158 households. The 2016 census measured the population of the village as 675 people in 178 households. It was the most populous village in its rural district.
