= Kord Ahmad-e Sofla =

Kord Ahmad-e Sofla كرداحمدسفلي
- Village
- Location within Iran
- Coordinates: 38°27′53″N 46°59′42″E
- Country: Iran
- Province: East Azerbaijan
- County: Ahar
- Bakhsh: Central
- Rural District: Goyjah Bel

Population (2006)
  - Total: 90
- Time zone: UTC+3:30 (IRST)
  - Summer (DST): UTC+4:30 (IRDT)

Kord Ahmad-e Sofla (Persian: كرداحمدسفلي, also Romanized as Kord Aḩmad-e Soflá) is a village in Goyjah Bel Rural District, in the Central District of Ahar County, East Azerbaijan Province, Iran. At the 2006 census, its population was 90, in 20 families.
