= Yuzband, Ahar =

Yuzband يوزبند
- Village
- Location within Iran
- Coordinates: 38°23′41″N 47°10′48″E
- Country: Iran
- Province: East Azerbaijan
- County: Ahar
- Bakhsh: Central
- Rural District: Bozkosh

Population (2006)
  - Total: 36
- Time zone: UTC+3:30 (IRST)
  - Summer (DST): UTC+4:30 (IRDT)

Yuzband (Persian: يوزبند, also Romanized as Yūzband; also known as Yūzbandeh) is a village in Bozkosh Rural District, in the Central District of Ahar County, East Azerbaijan Province, Iran. At the 2006 census its population was 36 in 9 families.
