= Sarajlu, Ahar =

Sarajlu سراجلو
- Village
- Location within Iran
- Coordinates: 38°42′15″N 46°52′19″E
- Country: Iran
- Province: East Azerbaijan
- County: Ahar
- Bakhsh: Central
- Rural District: Azghan

Population (2006)
  - Total: 359
- Time zone: UTC+3:30 (IRST)
  - Summer (DST): UTC+4:30 (IRDT)

Sarajlu (Persian: سراجلو, also romanized as Sarājlū; also known as Sūrūjar, Sarājarlū, and Sarājehlū) is a village in Azghan Rural District, in the Central District of Ahar County, East Azerbaijan Province, Iran. At the 2006 census its population was 359, in 79 families.
