= Anbaq-e Hajjikhan =

Anbaq-e Hajjikhan انباق حاجي خان
- Village
- Location within Iran
- Coordinates: 38°31′11″N 47°15′06″E
- Country: Iran
- Province: East Azerbaijan
- County: Ahar
- Bakhsh: Central
- Rural District: Qeshlaq
- Time zone: UTC+3:30 (IRST)
  - Summer (DST): UTC+4:30 (IRDT)

Anbaq-e Hajjikhan (Persian: انباق حاجي خان, also Romanized as Anbāq-e Ḩājjīkhān; also known as Anbāq) is a village in Qeshlaq Rural District, in the Central District of Ahar County, East Azerbaijan Province, Iran. The 2006 census noted its existence, but did not report its population.
