= Zandabad =

Village in East Azerbaijan province, Iran

Zandabad Persian: زندآباد
- Village
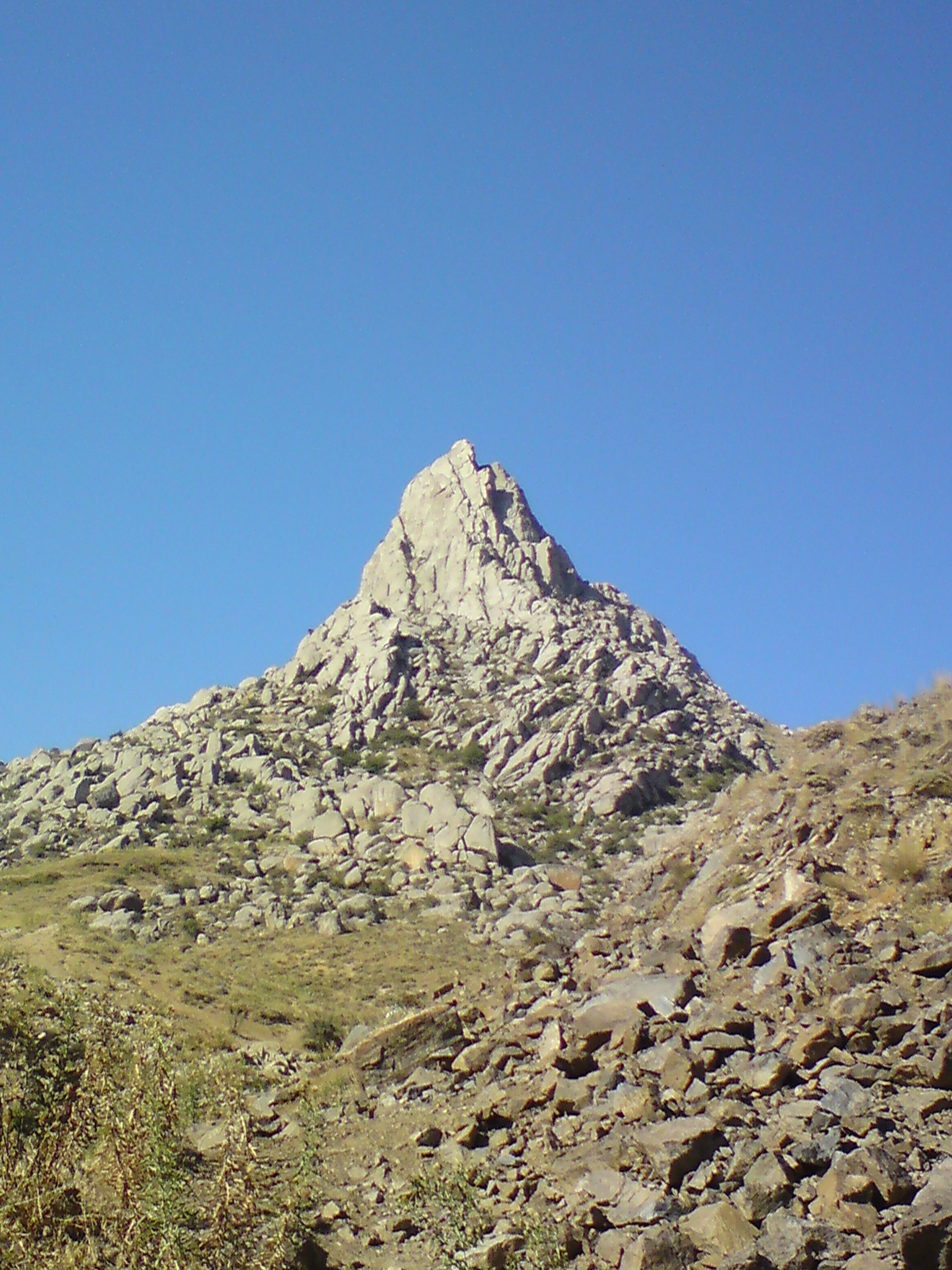
- Sheyvar Mountain overlooking the village of Zandabad

- Location within Iran
- Coordinates: 38°36′03″N 46°55′55″E
- Country: Iran
- Province: East Azerbaijan
- County: Ahar
- District: Central
- Rural District: Owch Hacha
- Elevation: 1,351.4 m (4,434 ft)

Population (2016)
  - Total: 975
- Time zone: UTC+3:30 (IRST)

Zandabad (Persian: زنداباد) (Note: Also romanized as Zandābād, and Azerbaijani: Zəndabad; also known as Zandava and Zandāwa; formerly Samadia and Azerbaijani: Səmədiyə) is a village in Owch Hacha Rural District of the Central District in Ahar County, East Azerbaijan province, Iran.

== Etymology ==
The village was originally called Samadia, but this name was changed to Zandabad by the proposal of the Iranian Academy and several khanate in 1936.

== Demographics ==
=== Language ===
The majority of the village's population are Azerbaijani. Today, the predominant language spoken in Samadia is Azerbaijani Turkic, which belongs to the Turkic languages family. Azerbaijani is a member of Oghuz branch of Turkic language, and it is closely related to Turkish and Turkmeni. The modern Azerbaijani language is evolved from the Eastern Oghuz dialect of Western (Oghuz) Turkic, which spread to Southwestern Asia during medieval Turkic migrations and was heavily influenced by Persian and Arabic.

=== Religion ===
The majority of the population are followers of Shia Islam.

=== Population ===
At the time of the 2006 National Census, the village's population was 1,104 in 224 households. The following census in 2011 counted 633 people in 166 households. The 2016 census measured the population of the village as 975 people in 298 households. It was the most populous village in its rural district.

== Geography ==
Samadia is a mountainous and temperate zone.

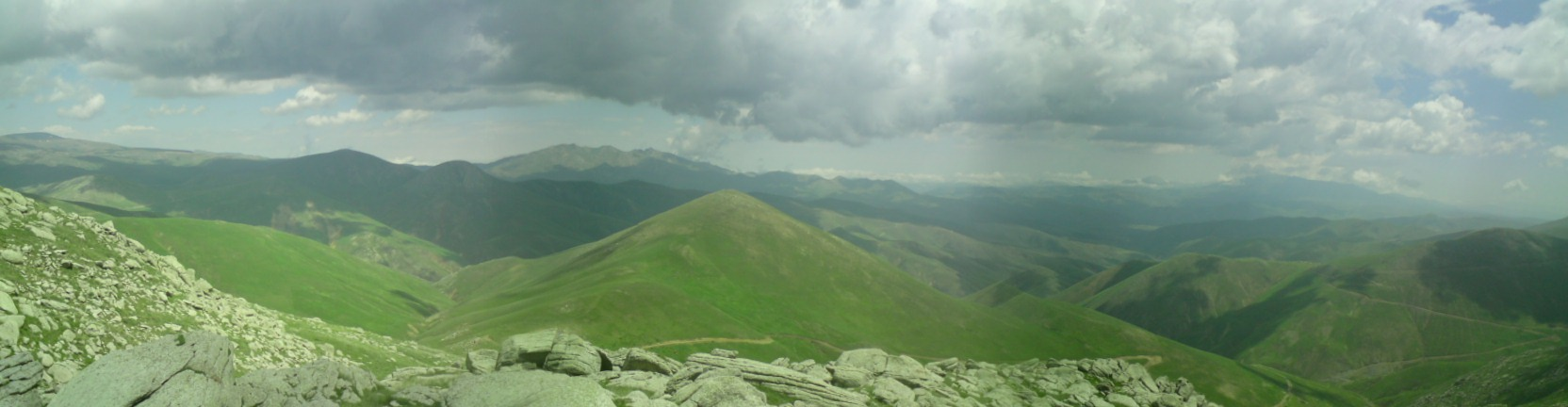
Panoramic view from the Samadia village mountains

== Economy ==
The village's main export is cereal. People live on agriculture and cattle. Crafting kilim is also a common source of income.

== Culture and art ==
=== Music ===
The popular music is played by Ashik that play the Saz or Qopuz, a form of lute. Their songs are partly improvised around a common base.

=== Cuisine ===
Some traditional Zandabad dishes are:

Ash is a soup prepared with bouillon, various vegetables, carrot, noodle and spices.

Dolma is a traditional Azerbaijani food. It is prepared with eggplant, capsicum, tomato or zucchini filled with a mixture of meat, split pea, onion and various spices.

== Attractions ==
There are many sights in Samadia, including:

- Səmədiyə daşı, an epigraph
- Şeyvər mountain, the highest mountain in the village
