= Andab-e Jadid =

Andab-e Jadid انداب جديد
- Village
- Location within Iran
- Coordinates: 38°22′16″N 47°14′54″E
- Country: Iran
- Province: East Azerbaijan
- County: Ahar
- Bakhsh: Central
- Rural District: Qeshlaq

Population (2006)
  - Total: 72
- Time zone: UTC+3:30 (IRST)
  - Summer (DST): UTC+4:30 (IRDT)

Andab-e Jadid (Persian: انداب جديد, also Romanized as Andāb-e Jadīd; also known as Andāb) is a village in Qeshlaq Rural District, in the Central District of Ahar County, East Azerbaijan Province, Iran. At the 2006 census, its population was 72, in 14 families.
