= Cheshmeh Vazan =

Village in East Azerbaijan province, Iran

Cheshmeh Vazan Persian: چشمه وزان
- Village
- Location within Iran
- Coordinates: 38°24′41″N 47°00′10″E
- Country: Iran
- Province: East Azerbaijan
- County: Ahar
- District: Central
- Rural District: Goyjah Bel

Population (2016)
  - Total: 467
- Time zone: UTC+3:30 (IRST)

Cheshmeh Vazan (Persian: چشمه وزان) (Note: Also romanized as Cheshmeh Vazān) is a village in Goyjah Bel Rural District of the Central District in Ahar County, East Azerbaijan province, Iran.

== Demographics ==
=== Population ===
At the time of the 2006 National Census, the village's population was 462 in 92 households. The following census in 2011 counted 432 people in 99 households. The 2016 census measured the population of the village as 467 people in 122 households.
