= Daghalian-e Bala =

Daghalian-e Bala دغليان بالا
- Village
- Location within Iran
- Coordinates: 38°28′06″N 46°47′16″E
- Country: Iran
- Province: East Azerbaijan
- County: Ahar
- Bakhsh: Central
- Rural District: Azghan

Population (2006)
  - Total: 221
- Time zone: UTC+3:30 (IRST)
  - Summer (DST): UTC+4:30 (IRDT)

Daghalian-e Bala (Persian: دغليان بالا, also Romanized as Daghalīān-e Bālā; also known as Daghlīān-e 'Olyā, Dāghlīān-e 'Olyā, and Daghliyan Olya) is a village in Azghan Rural District, in the Central District of Ahar County, East Azerbaijan province, Iran. At the 2006 census, its population was 221, in 48 families.
