= Rashtabad-e Jadid =

Rashtabad-e Jadid رشتابادجديد
- Village
- Location within Iran
- Coordinates: 38°30′25″N 46°49′52″E
- Country: Iran
- Province: East Azerbaijan
- County: Ahar
- Bakhsh: Central
- Rural District: Azghan

Population (2006)
  - Total: 42
- Time zone: UTC+3:30 (IRST)
  - Summer (DST): UTC+4:30 (IRDT)

Rashtabad-e Jadid (Persian: رشتابادجديد, also Romanized as Rashtābād-e Jadīd) is a village in Azghan Rural District, in the Central District of Ahar County, East Azerbaijan Province, Iran. At the 2006 census, its population was 42, in 7 families.
