= Anbaq-e Sorkhay =

Anbaq-e Sorkhay انباق سرخاي
- Village
- Location within Iran
- Coordinates: 38°29′53″N 47°15′21″E
- Country: Iran
- Province: East Azerbaijan
- County: Ahar
- Bakhsh: Central
- Rural District: Qeshlaq

Population (2006)
  - Total: 32
- Time zone: UTC+3:30 (IRST)
  - Summer (DST): UTC+4:30 (IRDT)

Anbaq-e Sorkhay (Persian: انباق سرخاي, also Romanized as Anbāq-e Sorkhāy; also known as Anbāq-e Sorkhā-ye Vosţá) is a village in Qeshlaq Rural District, in the Central District of Ahar County, East Azerbaijan Province, Iran. At the 2006 census, its population was 32, in 6 families.
