= Vargahan =

Village in East Azerbaijan province, Iran

Vargahan Persian: ورگهان
- Village
- Location within Iran
- Coordinates: 38°37′18″N 47°30′01″E
- Country: Iran
- Province: East Azerbaijan
- County: Ahar
- District: Central
- Rural District: Vargahan

Population (2016)
  - Total: 861
- Time zone: UTC+3:30 (IRST)

Vargahan (Persian: ورگهان) (Note: Also romanized as Vargahān) is a village in, and the capital of, Vargahan Rural District in the Central District of Ahar County, East Azerbaijan province, Iran.

== Demographics ==
=== Population ===
At the time of the 2006 National Census, the village's population was 960 in 208 households. The following census in 2011 counted 923 people in 243 households. The 2016 census measured the population of the village as 861 people in 231 households.
