= Yakhfervazan =

Village in East Azerbaijan province, Iran

Yakhfervazan Persian: يخفروزان
- Village
- Location within Iran
- Coordinates: 38°32′42″N 47°02′38″E
- Country: Iran
- Province: East Azerbaijan
- County: Ahar
- District: Central
- Rural District: Owch Hacha

Population (2016)
  - Total: 363
- Time zone: UTC+3:30 (IRST)

Yakhfervazan (Persian: يخفروزان) (Note: Also romanized as Yakh Forūzān, Yakhfarvazān, and Yakhfervazān) is a village in, and the capital of, Owch Hacha Rural District in the Central District of Ahar County, East Azerbaijan province, Iran.

== Demographics ==
=== Population ===
At the time of the 2006 National Census, the village's population was 503 in 127 households. The following census in 2011 counted 370 people in 111 households. The 2016 census measured the population of the village as 363 people in 128 households.
