= Tarancheh =

Tarancheh ترانچه
- Village
- Location within Iran
- Coordinates: 38°38′23″N 47°23′14″E
- Country: Iran
- Province: East Azerbaijan
- County: Ahar
- Bakhsh: Central
- Rural District: Vargahan

Population (2006)
  - Total: 26
- Time zone: UTC+3:30 (IRST)
  - Summer (DST): UTC+4:30 (IRDT)

Tarancheh (Persian: ترانچه, romanized: Tarāncheh; also known as Tarānjeh and Tūrāncheh) is a village in Vargahan Rural District, in the Central District of Ahar County, East Azerbaijan Province, Iran. At the 2006 census, its population was 26, in 5 families.
