= Tazeh Kand-e Shahverdi =

Village in East Azerbaijan province, Iran

Tazeh Kand-e Shahverdi Persian: تازه كندشاهوردي
- Village
- Location within Iran
- Coordinates: 38°25′45″N 47°14′46″E
- Country: Iran
- Province: East Azerbaijan
- County: Ahar
- District: Fandoqlu
- Rural District: Qeshlaq

Population (2016)
  - Total: 134
- Time zone: UTC+3:30 (IRST)

Tazeh Kand-e Shahverdi (Persian: تازه كندشاهوردي) (Note: Also romanized as Tāzeh Kand-e Shāhverdī; also known as Tāzeh Kand, Tāzehkand, and Tāzehkand-e Qeshlāq) is a village in Qeshlaq Rural District of Fandoqlu District in Ahar County, East Azerbaijan province, Iran, serving as capital of both the district and the rural district.

== Demographics ==
=== Population ===
At the time of the 2006 National Census, the village's population was 137 in 32 households, when it was in the Central District. The following census in 2011 counted 183 people in 48 households. The 2016 census measured the population of the village as 134 people in 43 households.

In 2018, the rural district was separated from the district in the formation of Fandoqlu District.
