= Naqqareh Kub-e Jadid =

Naqqareh Kub-e Jadid نقاره كوب جديد
- Village
- Location within Iran
- Coordinates: 38°28′12″N 47°13′38″E
- Country: Iran
- Province: East Azerbaijan
- County: Ahar
- Bakhsh: Central
- Rural District: Qeshlaq

Population (2006)
  - Total: 314
- Time zone: UTC+3:30 (IRST)
  - Summer (DST): UTC+4:30 (IRDT)

Naqqareh Kub-e Jadid (Persian: نقاره كوب جديد, also Romanized as Naqqāreh Kūb-e Jadīd and Naqāreh Kūb-e Jadīd) is a village in Qeshlaq Rural District, in the Central District of Ahar County, East Azerbaijan Province, Iran. At the 2006 census, its population was 314, in 61 families.
