= Kord Ahmad-e Olya =

Kord Ahmad-e Olya كرداحمدعليا
- Village
- Location within Iran
- Coordinates: 38°29′42″N 46°59′37″E
- Country: Iran
- Province: East Azerbaijan
- County: Ahar
- Bakhsh: Central
- Rural District: Goyjah Bel

Population (2006)
  - Total: 54
- Time zone: UTC+3:30 (IRST)
  - Summer (DST): UTC+4:30 (IRDT)

Kord Ahmad-e Olya (Persian: كرداحمدعليا, romanized: Kord Aḩmad-e ‘Olyā; also known as Kord Aḩmad-e Bālā) is a village in Goyjah Bel Rural District, in the Central District of Ahar County, East Azerbaijan Province, Iran. At the 2006 census, its population was 54, in 13 families.
