= Jaliq, Qeshlaq =

Jaliq جاليق
- Village
- Location within Iran
- Coordinates: 38°31′51″N 47°23′20″E
- Country: Iran
- Province: East Azerbaijan
- County: Ahar
- Bakhsh: Central
- Rural District: Qeshlaq

Population (2006)
  - Total: 16
- Time zone: UTC+3:30 (IRST)
  - Summer (DST): UTC+4:30 (IRDT)

Jaliq (Persian: جاليق, also Romanized as Jālīq) is a village in Qeshlaq Rural District, in the Central District of Ahar County, East Azerbaijan Province, Iran. At the 2006 census, its population was 16, in 6 families.
