= Daghalian-e Pain =

Daghalian-e Pain دغليان پائين
- Village
- Location within Iran
- Coordinates: 38°28′03″N 46°48′10″E
- Country: Iran
- Province: East Azerbaijan
- County: Ahar
- Bakhsh: Central
- Rural District: Azghan

Population (2006)
  - Total: 114
- Time zone: UTC+3:30 (IRST)
  - Summer (DST): UTC+4:30 (IRDT)

Daghalian-e Pain (Persian: دغليان پائين, also Romanized as Daghalīān-e Pā’īn and Daghalyān Pā’īn; also known as Ashāqī Tīgalān, Dāghlīān-e Soflá, Daghliyan Sofla, Tigilan, and Tygylyak) is a village in Azghan Rural District, in the Central District of Ahar County, East Azerbaijan province, Iran. At the 2006 census, its population was 114, in 23 families.
