= Taranjeh =

Taranjeh may refer to:

- Ghajar, Golan Heights
- Tarancheh, Iran
