= Yuzband =

Yuzband (Persian: يوزبند) may refer to:

- Yuzband, Ahar
- Yuzband, Kaleybar
