= Naqqareh Kub-e Qadim =

Naqqareh Kub-e Qadim نقاره كوب قديم
- Village
- Location within Iran
- Coordinates: 38°29′38″N 47°12′58″E
- Country: Iran
- Province: East Azerbaijan
- County: Ahar
- Bakhsh: Central
- Rural District: Qeshlaq

Population (2006)
  - Total: 173
- Time zone: UTC+3:30 (IRST)
  - Summer (DST): UTC+4:30 (IRDT)

Naqqareh Kub-e Qadim (Persian: نقاره كوب قديم, also Romanized as Naqqāreh Kūb-e Qadīm) is a village in Qeshlaq Rural District, in the Central District of Ahar County, East Azerbaijan Province, Iran. At the 2006 census, its population was 173, in 33 families.
