= Chapan, Iran =

Village in East Azerbaijan province, Iran

Chapan Persian: چاپان
- Village
- Location within Iran
- Coordinates: 38°34′03″N 47°10′15″E
- Country: Iran
- Province: East Azerbaijan
- County: Ahar
- District: Central
- Rural District: Owch Hacha

Population (2016)
  - Total: 231
- Time zone: UTC+3:30 (IRST)

Chapan (Persian: چاپان) (Note: Also romanized as Chāpān) is a village in Owch Hacha Rural District of the Central District in Ahar County, East Azerbaijan province, Iran.

== Demographics ==
=== Population ===
At the time of the 2006 National Census, the village's population was 323 in 57 households. The following census in 2011 counted 306 people in 71 households. The 2016 census measured the population of the village as 231 people in 57 households.
