= Garangah =

Village in East Azerbaijan province, Iran

Garangah Persian: گرنگاه
- Village
- Location within Iran
- Coordinates: 38°26′24″N 47°06′54″E
- Country: Iran
- Province: East Azerbaijan
- County: Ahar
- District: Central
- Rural District: Bozkosh

Population (2016)
  - Total: 200
- Time zone: UTC+3:30 (IRST)

Garangah (Persian: گرنگاه) (Note: Also romanized as Garangāh; also known as Karamgāh and Karangāh) is a village in, and the capital of, Bozkosh Rural District in the Central District of Ahar County, East Azerbaijan province, Iran.

== Demographics ==
=== Population ===
At the time of the 2006 National Census, the village's population was 400 in 89 households. The following census in 2011 counted 299 people in 85 households. The 2016 census measured the population of the village as 200 people in 64 households.
