= Qeshlaq-e Zakhor =

Village in East Azerbaijan province, Iran

Qeshlaq-e Zakhor Persian: قشلاق ذاخر
- Village
- Location within Iran
- Country: Iran
- Province: East Azerbaijan
- County: Ahar
- District: Central
- Rural District: Vargahan

Population (2016)
  - Total: 299
- Time zone: UTC+3:30 (IRST)

Qeshlaq-e Zakhor (Persian: قشلاق ذاخر) (Note: Also romanized as Qeshlāq-e Zākhor; also known as Qeshlāq-e Zākhvor) is a village in Vargahan Rural District of the Central District in Ahar County, East Azerbaijan province, Iran.

== Demographics ==
=== Population ===
At the time of the 2006 National Census, the village's population was 328 in 64 households. The following census in 2011 counted 287 people in 66 households. The 2016 census measured the population of the village as 299 people in 79 households.
