= Vejeni =

Village in East Azerbaijan province, Iran

Vejeni Persian: وجني
- Village
- Location within Iran
- Coordinates: 38°39′25″N 47°31′56″E
- Country: Iran
- Province: East Azerbaijan
- County: Ahar
- District: Central
- Rural District: Vargahan

Population (2016)
  - Total: 400
- Time zone: UTC+3:30 (IRST)

Vejeni (Persian: وجني, Armenian: Պիճան) (Note: Also romanized as Vejenī) is a village in Vargahan Rural District of the Central District in Ahar County, East Azerbaijan province, Iran.

== Demographics ==
=== Population ===
At the time of the 2006 National Census, the village's population was 337 in 77 households. The following census in 2011 counted 361 people in 106 households. The 2016 census measured the population of the village as 400 people in 131 households.
