= Alu, Iran =

Alu (Persian: الو) in Iran may refer to:

- Alu, Ardabil
- Alu, Mazandaran

== See also ==
- Allu, Iran (disambiguation)
