= Kasana =

Kasana may refer to:

- Kasana, Iran, a village in Iran
- Vipin Kasana, Indian javelin thrower

== See also ==
- Roman Catholic Diocese of Kasana–Luweero, Uganda
