= Azghan =

Village in East Azerbaijan province, Iran

Azghan Persian: آذغان
- Village
- Location within Iran
- Coordinates: 38°31′34″N 46°56′31″E
- Country: Iran
- Province: East Azerbaijan
- County: Ahar
- District: Central
- Rural District: Azghan

Population (2016)
  - Total: 1,011
- Time zone: UTC+3:30 (IRST)

Azghan (Persian: اذغان) (Note: Also romanized as Āzghān and Āz̄ghān; also known as Ārghān, Askol, and Azgan) is a village in, and the capital of, Azghan Rural District in the Central District of Ahar County, East Azerbaijan province, Iran.

== Demographics ==
=== Population ===
At the time of the 2006 National Census, the village's population was 1,132 in 290 households. The following census in 2011 counted 1,061 people in 296 households. The 2016 census measured the population of the village as 1,011 people in 346 households. It was the most populous village in its rural district.
