= Zaglik-e Olya =

Zaglik-e Olya زگليك عليا
- Village
- Location within Iran
- Coordinates: 38°35′07″N 47°06′48″E
- Country: Iran
- Province: East Azerbaijan
- County: Ahar
- Bakhsh: Central
- Rural District: Owch Hacha

Population (2006)
  - Total: 70
- Time zone: UTC+3:30 (IRST)
  - Summer (DST): UTC+4:30 (IRDT)

Zaglik-e Olya (Persian: زگليك عليا, also Romanized as Zaglīk-e ‘Olyā; also known as Zaklak-e Bālā and Zaklīk-e Bālā) is a village in Owch Hacha Rural District, in the Central District of Ahar County, East Azerbaijan Province, Iran. At the 2006 census, its population was 70, in 15 families.
