= Dowshdur =

Village in East Azerbaijan province, Iran

Dowshdur Persian: دوشدور
- Village
- Location within Iran
- Coordinates: 38°33′50″N 47°29′45″E
- Country: Iran
- Province: East Azerbaijan
- County: Ahar
- District: Central
- Rural District: Vargahan

Population (2016)
  - Total: 969
- Time zone: UTC+3:30 (IRST)

Dowshdur (Persian: دوشدور) (Note: Also romanized as Dowshdūr; also known as Dowshtūr) is a village in Vargahan Rural District of the Central District in Ahar County, East Azerbaijan province, Iran.

== Demographics ==
=== Population ===
At the time of the 2006 National Census, the village's population was 965 in 204 households. The following census in 2011 counted 935 people in 253 households. The 2016 census measured the population of the village as 969 people in 282 households. It was the most populous village in its rural district.
