= Mollalar, Agdam =

Mollalar, Agdam may refer to:

- Mollalar (40° 05' N 46° 50' E), Agdam
- Mollalar (40° 09' N 46° 52' E), Agdam
