= Anbaq-e Javad =

Anbaq-e Javad انباق جواد
- Village
- Location within Iran
- Coordinates: 38°29′10″N 47°15′49″E
- Country: Iran
- Province: East Azerbaijan
- County: Ahar
- Bakhsh: Central
- Rural District: Qeshlaq

Population (2006)
  - Total: 107
- Time zone: UTC+3:30 (IRST)
  - Summer (DST): UTC+4:30 (IRDT)

Anbaq-e Javad (Persian: انباق جواد, also Romanized as Anbāq-e Javād; also known as Anbāq-e Pā'īn) is a village in Qeshlaq Rural District, in the Central District of Ahar County, East Azerbaijan Province, Iran. At the 2006 census, its population was 107, in 18 families.
