= Jaliq, Bozkosh =

Jaliq جاليق
- Village
- Location within Iran
- Coordinates: 38°26′19″N 47°09′01″E
- Country: Iran
- Province: East Azerbaijan
- County: Ahar
- Bakhsh: Central
- Rural District: Bozkosh

Population (2006)
  - Total: 47
- Time zone: UTC+3:30 (IRST)
  - Summer (DST): UTC+4:30 (IRDT)

Jaliq (Persian: جاليق, also Romanized as Jālīq; also known as Jāleq) is a village in Bozkosh Rural District, in the Central District of Ahar County, East Azerbaijan Province, Iran. At the 2006 census, its population was 47, in 9 families.
