= Kordlar-e Tarancheh =

Kordlar-e Tarancheh كردلرترانچه
- Village
- Location within Iran
- Coordinates: 38°38′36″N 47°21′10″E
- Country: Iran
- Province: East Azerbaijan
- County: Ahar
- Bakhsh: Central
- Rural District: Vargahan

Population (2006)
  - Total: 137
- Time zone: UTC+3:30 (IRST)
  - Summer (DST): UTC+4:30 (IRDT)

Kordlar-e Tarancheh (Persian: كردلرترانچه, romanized: Kordlar-e Tūrāncheh; also known as Kordlar) is a village in Vargahan Rural District, in the Central District of Ahar County, East Azerbaijan Province, Iran. At the 2006 census, its population was 137, in 28 families.
