= Gunjik =

Village in East Azerbaijan province, Iran

Gunjik Persian: گونجيك
- Village
- Location within Iran
- Coordinates: 38°27′22″N 46°55′38″E
- Country: Iran
- Province: East Azerbaijan
- County: Ahar
- District: Central
- Rural District: Goyjah Bel

Population (2016)
  - Total: 686
- Time zone: UTC+3:30 (IRST)

Gunjik (Persian: گونجيك) (Note: Also romanized as Gūnjīk; also known as Gonjīk) is a village in Goyjah Bel Rural District of the Central District in Ahar County, East Azerbaijan province, Iran.

== Demographics ==
=== Population ===
At the time of the 2006 National Census, the village's population was 751 in 152 households. The following census in 2011 counted 679 people in 175 households. The 2016 census measured the population of the village as 686 people in 206 households. It was the most populous village in its rural district.
