= Khuniq =

Village in East Azerbaijan province, Iran

Khuniq Persian: خونيق
- Village
- Location within Iran
- Coordinates: 38°25′53″N 47°00′16″E
- Country: Iran
- Province: East Azerbaijan
- County: Ahar
- District: Central
- Rural District: Goyjah Bel

Population (2016)
  - Total: 647
- Time zone: UTC+3:30 (IRST)

Khuniq (Persian: خونيق) (Note: Also romanized as Khownyaq and Khūnīq; also known as Kūtīyeh) is a village in, and the capital of, Goyjah Bel Rural District in the Central District of Ahar County, East Azerbaijan province, Iran.

== Demographics ==
=== Population ===
At the time of the 2006 National Census, the village's population was 783 in 167 households. The following census in 2011 counted 650 people in 170 households. The 2016 census measured the population of the village as 647 people in 198 households.
