= Qalandar, Ahar =

Village in East Azerbaijan province, Iran

Qalandar Persian: قلندر
- Village
- Location within Iran
- Coordinates: 38°34′41″N 47°03′33″E
- Country: Iran
- Province: East Azerbaijan
- County: Ahar
- District: Central
- Rural District: Owch Hacha

Population (2016)
  - Total: 563
- Time zone: UTC+3:30 (IRST)

Qalandar (Persian: قلندر) (Note: Also known as Qalandarī) is a village in Owch Hacha Rural District of the Central District in Ahar County, East Azerbaijan province, Iran.

== Demographics ==
=== Population ===
At the time of the 2006 National Census, the village's population was 650 in 158 households. The following census in 2011 counted 609 people in 172 households. The 2016 census measured the population of the village as 563 people in 179 households.
