= Ravasjan =

Village in East Azerbaijan province, Iran

Ravasjan Persian: رواسجان
- Village
- Location within Iran
- Coordinates: 38°30′30″N 46°56′51″E
- Country: Iran
- Province: East Azerbaijan
- County: Ahar
- District: Central
- Rural District: Azghan

Population (2016)
  - Total: 984
- Time zone: UTC+3:30 (IRST)

Ravasjan (Persian: رواسجان) (Note: Also romanized as Ravāsjān) is a village in Azghan Rural District of the Central District in Ahar County, East Azerbaijan province, Iran.

== Demographics ==
=== Population ===
At the time of the 2006 National Census, the village's population was 866 in 203 households. The following census in 2011 counted 943 people in 256 households. The 2016 census measured the population of the village as 984 people in 273 households.
