= Qurchi Kandi =

Qurchi Kandi قورچي كندي
- Village
- Location within Iran
- Coordinates: 38°23′00″N 47°05′00″E
- Country: Iran
- Province: East Azerbaijan
- County: Ahar
- Bakhsh: Central
- Rural District: Goyjah Bel

Population (2006)
  - Total: 251
- Time zone: UTC+3:30 (IRST)
  - Summer (DST): UTC+4:30 (IRDT)

Qurchi Kandi (Persian: قورچي كندي, also Romanized as Qūrchī Kandī) is a village in Goyjah Bel Rural District, in the Central District of Ahar County, East Azerbaijan Province, Iran. At the 2006 census, its population was 251, in 49 families.
