= Kangolabad =

Village in East Azerbaijan province, Iran

Kangolabad Persian: كنگل اباد
- Village
- Location within Iran
- Coordinates: 38°33′19″N 46°48′16″E
- Country: Iran
- Province: East Azerbaijan
- County: Ahar
- District: Central
- Rural District: Azghan

Population (2016)
  - Total: 416
- Time zone: UTC+3:30 (IRST)

Kangolabad (Persian: كنگل اباد) (Note: Also romanized as Kangolābād; also known as Gangalābād, Gangazu, Gangelo, Gangolābād, and Sheyţān Kand) is a village in Azghan Rural District of the Central District in Ahar County, East Azerbaijan province, Iran.

== Demographics ==
=== Population ===
At the time of the 2006 National Census, the village's population was 578 in 119 households. The following census in 2011 counted 481 people in 111 households. The 2016 census measured the population of the village as 416 people in 121 households.
