= Rashtabad-e Qadim =

Village in East Azerbaijan province, Iran

Rashtabad-e Qadim Persian: رشتابادقديم
- Village
- Location within Iran
- Coordinates: 38°30′34″N 46°50′37″E
- Country: Iran
- Province: East Azerbaijan
- County: Ahar
- District: Central
- Rural District: Azghan

Population (2016)
  - Total: 525
- Time zone: UTC+3:30 (IRST)

Rashtabad-e Qadim (Persian: رشتابادقديم) (Note: Also romanized as Rashtābād-e Qadīm) is a village in Azghan Rural District of the Central District in Ahar County, East Azerbaijan province, Iran.

== Demographics ==
=== Population ===
At the time of the 2006 National Census, the village's population was 528 in 121 households. The following census in 2011 counted 511 people in 143 households. The 2016 census measured the population of the village as 525 people in 160 households.
