= Kordlar, Ahar =

Village in East Azerbaijan province, Iran

Kordlar Persian: كردلر
- Village
- Location within Iran
- Coordinates: 38°24′34″N 47°05′35″E
- Country: Iran
- Province: East Azerbaijan
- County: Ahar
- District: Central
- Rural District: Bozkosh

Population (2016)
  - Total: 416
- Time zone: UTC+3:30 (IRST)

Kordlar (Persian: كردلر) is a village in Bozkosh Rural District of the Central District in Ahar County, East Azerbaijan province, Iran.

== Demographics ==
=== Population ===
At the time of the 2006 National Census, the village's population was 706 in 131 households. The following census in 2011 counted 606 people in 163 households. The 2016 census measured the population of the village as 416 people in 138 households.
