= Kasanaq =

Village in East Azerbaijan province, Iran

Kasanaq Persian: كسانق
- Village
- Location within Iran
- Coordinates: 38°31′54″N 46°52′57″E
- Country: Iran
- Province: East Azerbaijan
- County: Ahar
- District: Central
- Rural District: Azghan

Population (2016)
  - Total: 411
- Time zone: UTC+3:30 (IRST)

Kasanaq (Persian: كسانق) (Note: Also romanized as Kasānaq; also known as Kasalan, Kāsānā, and Kaslān) is a village in Azghan Rural District of the Central District in Ahar County, East Azerbaijan province, Iran.

== Demographics ==
=== Population ===
At the time of the 2006 National Census, the village's population was 532 in 121 households. The following census in 2011 counted 424 people in 122 households. The 2016 census measured the population of the village as 411 people in 146 households.
