= Kaqalaq =

Village in East Azerbaijan province, Iran

Kaqalaq Persian: كقالق
- Village
- Location within Iran
- Coordinates: 38°23′13″N 47°03′14″E
- Country: Iran
- Province: East Azerbaijan
- County: Ahar
- District: Central
- Rural District: Bozkosh

Population (2016)
  - Total: 626
- Time zone: UTC+3:30 (IRST)

Kaqalaq (Persian: كقالق) (Note: Also romanized as Kaqālaq; also known as Kafalagh and Kafāleq) is a village in Bozkosh Rural District of the Central District in Ahar County, East Azerbaijan province, Iran.

== Demographics ==
=== Population ===
At the time of the 2006 National Census, the village's population was 785 in 204 households. The following census in 2011 counted 747 people in 228 households. The 2016 census measured the population of the village as 626 people in 205 households.
