= Naraman-e Naqareh Kub =

Naraman-e Naqareh Kub نرامان نقاره كوب
- Village
- Location within Iran
- Coordinates: 34°17′47″N 46°00′47″E
- Country: Iran
- Province: Kermanshah
- County: Sarpol-e Zahab
- Bakhsh: Central
- Rural District: Qaleh Shahin

Population (2006)
  - Total: 582
- Time zone: UTC+3:30 (IRST)
  - Summer (DST): UTC+4:30 (IRDT)

Naraman-e Naqareh Kub (Persian: نرامان نقاره كوب, also Romanized as Narāmān-e Naqārh Kūb; also known as Naqāreh Kūb, Narāmān, and Neqāreh Kūb) is a village in Qaleh Shahin Rural District, in the Central District of Sarpol-e Zahab County, Kermanshah Province, Iran. At the 2006 census, its population was 582, in 126 families.
