= Mollalar, Azerbaijan =

Mollalar
- Location within Azerbaijan Location within Karabakh Economic Region
- Coordinates: 40°27′00″N 47°11′13″E
- Country: Azerbaijan
- Rayon: Barda
- Time zone: UTC+4 (AZT)
  - Summer (DST): UTC+5 (AZT)

Mollalar is a village in the Barda Rayon of Azerbaijan.
