= Sarajlu, Kaleybar =

Sarajlu سراجلو
- village
- Location within Iran
- Coordinates: 39°6′38.34″N 47°14′55.09″E
- Country: Iran
- Province: East Azerbaijan
- County: Kaleybar
- Bakhsh: Central
- Rural District: Mulan

Population (2006)
  - Total: 216
- Time zone: UTC+3:30 (IRST)
  - Summer (DST): UTC+4:30 (IRDT)

Sarajlu (Persian: سراجلو, also Romanized as Sarājlū)is a village in Mulan Rural District, in the Central District of Kaleybar County, East Azerbaijan Province, Iran. At the 2006 census, its population was 216, in 35 families.
