= Allu (surname) =

Allu is a Telugu surname. Notable people with this surname include:

- Allu Aravind (born 1949), Telugu film producer
- Allu Arjun (born 1983), Telugu film actor
- Allu Sirish (born 1985), Telugu film actor
- Allu Ramalingaiah, Telugu film actor
