= Alu, Ardabil =

Village in Ardabil province, Iran

Alu Persian: الو
- Village
- Location within Iran
- Coordinates: 37°49′52″N 48°22′17″E
- Country: Iran
- Province: Ardabil
- County: Kowsar
- District: Central
- Rural District: Sanjabad-e Shomali

Population (2016)
  - Total: 22
- Time zone: UTC+3:30 (IRST)

Alu (Persian: الو) (Note: Also romanized as Āllū, Alov, and Ālū) is a village in Sanjabad-e Shomali Rural District of the Central District in Kowsar County, Ardabil province, Iran.

== Demographics ==
=== Population ===
At the time of the 2006 National Census, the village's population was 86 in 17 households. The following census in 2011 counted 51 people in 11 households. The 2016 census measured the population of the village as 22 people in eight households.
