= Mollalar (Boyəhmədli), Agdam =

Mollalar
- Location within Azerbaijan Location within Karabakh Economic Region
- Coordinates: 40°08′49″N 46°52′26″E
- Country: Azerbaijan
- Rayon: Agdam
- Time zone: UTC+4 (AZT)
  - Summer (DST): UTC+5 (AZT)

Mollalar (also, Mollar) is a village in the Agdam Rayon of Azerbaijan.

During the Nagorno-Karabakh conflict, the village was occupied by Armenian armed forces on June 15, 1993. It was ruined in the conflict. Aghdam district was returned to Azerbaijan on November 20 under the trilateral Statement signed by the President of Azerbaijan, the President of Russia and the Prime Minister of Armenia on November 10, 2020.
