= Bozkosh Rural District =

Rural district in East Azerbaijan province, Iran

Bozkosh Rural District Persian: دهستان بزکش
- Rural District
- Location within Iran
- Coordinates: 38°25′N 47°07′E
- Country: Iran
- Province: East Azerbaijan
- County: Ahar
- District: Central
- Established: 1987
- Capital: Garangah

Population (2016)
  - Total: 4,141
- Time zone: UTC+3:30 (IRST)

Bozkosh Rural District (Persian: دهستان بزکش) is in the Central District of Ahar County, East Azerbaijan province, Iran. Its capital is the village of Garangah.

== Demographics ==
=== Population ===
At the time of the 2006 National Census, the rural district's population was 4,900 in 1,063 households. There were 5,012 inhabitants in 1,251 households at the following census of 2011. The 2016 census measured the population of the rural district as 4,141 in 1,258 households. The most populous of its 25 villages was Sholeh Boran, with 675 people.

=== Other villages in the rural district ===
- Kaqalaq
- Kordlar
