= Fandoqlu District =

District in East Azerbaijan province, Iran

Fandoqlu District Persian: بخش فندقلو
- District
- Location within Iran
- Coordinates: 38°27′N 47°21′E
- Country: Iran
- Province: East Azerbaijan
- County: Ahar
- Established: 2018
- Capital: Tazeh Kand-e Shahverdi
- Time zone: UTC+3:30 (IRST)

Fandoqlu District (Persian: بخش فندقلو) is in Ahar County, East Azerbaijan province, Iran. Its capital is the village of Tazeh Kand-e Shahverdi, whose population at the time of the 2016 National Census was 134 people in 43 households.

== History ==
In 2018, Qeshlaq Rural District was separated from the Central District in the formation of Fandoqlu District.

== Demographics ==
=== Administrative divisions ===
Fandoqlu District
Administrative Divisions
Naqduz RD
Qeshlaq RD
RD = Rural District
