= Azghan Rural District =

Rural district in East Azerbaijan province, Iran

Azghan Rural District Persian: دهستان آذغان
- Rural District
- Location within Iran
- Coordinates: 38°35′N 46°54′E
- Country: Iran
- Province: East Azerbaijan
- County: Ahar
- District: Central
- Established: 1987
- Capital: Azghan

Population (2016)
  - Total: 6,204
- Time zone: UTC+3:30 (IRST)

Azghan Rural District (Persian: دهستان آذغان) is in the Central District of Ahar County, East Azerbaijan province, Iran. Its capital is the village of Azghan.

== Demographics ==
=== Population ===
At the time of the 2006 National Census, the rural district's population was 7,100 in 1,609 households. There were 6,314 inhabitants in 1,688 households at the following census of 2011. The 2016 census measured the population of the rural district as 6,204 in 1,901 households. The most populous of its 27 villages was Azghan, with 1,011 people.

=== Other villages in the rural district ===
- Kangolabad
- Kasanaq
- Rashtabad-e Qadim
- Ravasjan
