= Owch Hacha Rural District =

Rural district in East Azerbaijan province, Iran

Owch Hacha Rural District Persian: دهستان اوچ هاچا
- Rural District
- Location within Iran
- Coordinates: 38°35′N 47°03′E
- Country: Iran
- Province: East Azerbaijan
- County: Ahar
- District: Central
- Established: 1987
- Capital: Yakhfervazan

Population (2016)
  - Total: 4,407
- Time zone: UTC+3:30 (IRST)

Owch Hacha Rural District (Persian: دهستان اوچ هاچا) is in the Central District of Ahar County, East Azerbaijan province, Iran. Its capital is the village of Yakhfervazan.

== Demographics ==
=== Population ===
At the time of the 2006 National Census, the rural district's population was 5,286 in 1,158 households. There were 4,670 inhabitants in 1,209 households at the following census of 2011. The 2016 census measured the population of the rural district as 4,407 in 1,318 households. The most populous of its 28 villages was Zandabad, with 975 people.

=== Other villages in the rural district ===
- Anjerd
- Chapan
- Qalandar
