= Goyjah Bel Rural District =

Rural district in East Azerbaijan province, Iran

Goyjah Bel Rural District Persian: دهستان گويجه بل
- Rural District
- Location within Iran
- Coordinates: 38°25′N 46°55′E
- Country: Iran
- Province: East Azerbaijan
- County: Ahar
- District: Central
- Established: 1987
- Capital: Khuniq

Population (2016)
  - Total: 4,307
- Time zone: UTC+3:30 (IRST)

Goyjah Bel Rural District (Persian: دهستان گويجه بل) is in the Central District of Ahar County, East Azerbaijan province, Iran. Its capital is the village of Khuniq.

== Demographics ==
=== Population ===
At the time of the 2006 National Census, the rural district's population was 5,056 in 1,025 households. There were 4,269 inhabitants in 1,070 households at the following census of 2011. The 2016 census measured the population of the rural district as 4,307 in 1,260 households. The most populous of its 29 villages was Gunjik, with 686 people.

=== Other villages in the rural district ===
- Cheshmeh Vazan
- Daylar
