= Vargahan Rural District =

Rural district in East Azerbaijan province, Iran

Varaghan Rural District Persian: دهستان ورگهان
- Rural District
- Location within Iran
- Coordinates: 38°37′N 47°22′E
- Country: Iran
- Province: East Azerbaijan
- County: Ahar
- District: Central
- Established: 1987
- Capital: Vargahan

Population (2016)
  - Total: 4,296
- Time zone: UTC+3:30 (IRST)

Vargahan Rural District (Persian: دهستان ورگهان) is in the Central District of Ahar County, East Azerbaijan province, Iran. Its capital is the village of Vargahan.

== Demographics ==
=== Population ===
At the time of the 2006 National Census, the rural district's population was 5,101 in 1,085 households. There were 4,701 inhabitants in 1,261 households at the following census of 2011. The 2016 census measured the population of the rural district as 4,296 in 1,229 households. The most populous of its 42 villages was Dowshdur, with 969 people.

=== Other villages in the rural district ===
- Qeshlaq-e Zakhor
- Vejeni
