= Qeshlaq Rural District (Ahar County) =

Rural district in East Azerbaijan province, Iran

Qeshlaq Rural District Persian: دهستان قشلاق
- Rural District
- Location within Iran
- Coordinates: 38°27′N 47°17′E
- Country: Iran
- Province: East Azerbaijan
- County: Ahar
- District: Fandoqlu
- Established: 1987
- Capital: Tazeh Kand-e Shahverdi

Population (2016)
  - Total: 9,833
- Time zone: UTC+3:30 (IRST)

Qeshlaq Rural District (Persian: دهستان قشلاق) is in Fandoqlu District of Ahar County, East Azerbaijan province, Iran. Its capital is the village of Tazeh Kand-e Shahverdi.

== Population ==
At the time of the 2006 National Census, the rural district's population (as a part of the Central District) was 12,028 in 2,539 households. There were 11,448 inhabitants in 2,955 households at the following census of 2011. The 2016 census measured the population of the rural district as 9,833 in 2,953 households. The most populous of its 80 villages was Efil, with 1,733 people.

In 2018, the rural district was separated from the district in the formation of Fandoqlu District.

=== Other villages in the rural district ===
- Chol Qeshlaqi
- Shahverdi
