= Central District (Ahar County) =

District in East Azerbaijan province, Iran

Central District (Ahar County) Persian: بخش مرکزی شهرستان اهر
- District
- Location within Iran
- Coordinates: 38°33′N 47°09′E
- Country: Iran
- Province: East Azerbaijan
- County: Ahar
- Capital: Ahar

Population (2016)
  - Total: 133,829
- Time zone: UTC+3:30 (IRST)

The Central District of Ahar County (Persian: بخش مرکزی شهرستان اهر) is in East Azerbaijan province, Iran. Its capital is the city of Ahar.

== History ==
In 2018, Qeshlaq Rural District was separated from the district in the formation of Fandoqlu District.

== Demographics ==
=== Population ===
At the time of the 2006 National Census, the district's population was 125,253 in 29,323 households. The following census in 2011 counted 129,022 people in 34,244 households. The 2016 census measured the population of the district as 133,829 inhabitants living in 40,048 households.

=== Administrative divisions ===
Central District (Ahar County) Population
Administrative Divisions	2006	2011	2016
Azghan RD	7,100	6,314	6,204
Bozkosh RD	4,900	5,012	4,141
Goyjah Bel RD	5,056	4,269	4,307
Owch Hacha RD	5,286	4,670	4,407
Qeshlaq RD (Note: Transferred to Fandoqlu District after the 2016 census)	12,028	11,448	9,833
Vargahan RD	5,101	4,701	4,296
Ahar (city)	85,782	92,608	100,641
Total	125,253	129,022	133,829
RD = Rural District
