= Kandovan =

Kandovan or Kandavan (Persian: كندوان) may refer to:

- Kandovan, Meyaneh, East Azerbaijan Province
- Kandovan, Osku, East Azerbaijan Province
- Kandovan, Sarab, East Azerbaijan Province
- Kandovan, Ardabil, Ardabil Province
- Kandovan District, in East Azerbaijan Province
- Kandovan Rural District, in East Azerbaijan Province
- Kandovan Tunnel, a major road tunnel in Iran
