= Komi =

Komi may refer to:

== Places ==
=== Greece ===
- Komi, Tinos, a village in the municipality of Exomvourgo, in the Cycladic islands
- Komi, Elis, a settlement in the municipality of Vouprasia

=== Iran ===
- Komi, Iran, a village in East Azerbaijan Province, Iran

=== Russia ===
- Komi Republic of Russia
  - Komi Autonomous Soviet Socialist Republic of the former USSR

== Other uses ==
- Komi peoples, a people of Russia
- Komi language, their Finno-Ugric language
- Komi (Go), compensation points in the board game Go
- Komi (restaurant), a restaurant in Washington, D.C.
- Kenkey or komi, a West African dish

== People with the surname ==
- Richard Komi (born c. 1967), Nigerian-born American politician
- Naoshi Komi (born 1986), Japanese manga artist
- Yota Komi (born 2002), Japanese footballer

Fictional characters:

- Shōko Komi, a character in Komi Can't Communicate

== People with the given name ==
- Kōmi Hirose (born 1966), Japanese pop singer
- Komi Moreira (born 1968), Togolese cyclist
- Komi Akakpo (born 1995), Togolese footballer

== See also ==
- Komi Kebir, a village in Famagusta District
- Koumi, Nagano, a town in Minamisaku, Nagano, Japan
