= Tajaraq =

Tajaraq or Tajaroq (Persian: تجرق) may refer to:

- Tajaraq, Ardabil
- Tajaraq, Ajab Shir, East Azerbaijan Province
- Tajaroq, Meyaneh, East Azerbaijan Province
- Tajaroq, alternate name of Tajareh Rud, Meyaneh County, East Azerbaijan Province
