= Neqabad =

Neqabad نقااباد
- Village
- Location within Iran
- Coordinates: 37°40′00″N 47°40′00″E
- Country: Iran
- Province: East Azerbaijan
- County: Meyaneh
- Bakhsh: Kandovan
- Rural District: Tirchai

Population (2006)
  - Total: 234
- Time zone: UTC+3:30 (IRST)
  - Summer (DST): UTC+4:30 (IRDT)

Neqabad (Persian: نقااباد, also Romanized as Neqābād) is a village in Tirchai Rural District, Kandovan District, Meyaneh County, East Azerbaijan Province, Iran. At the 2006 census, its population was 234, in 70 families.
