= Qezel Yataq =

Qezel Yataq قزل ياتاق
- village
- Location within Iran
- Coordinates: 37°46′18″N 48°05′43″E
- Country: Iran
- Province: East Azerbaijan
- County: Meyaneh
- Bakhsh: Kandovan
- Rural District: Garmeh-ye Shomali

Population (2006)
  - Total: 136
- Time zone: UTC+3:30 (IRST)
  - Summer (DST): UTC+4:30 (IRDT)

Qezel Yataq (Persian: قزل ياتاق, also Romanized as Qezel Yātāq; also known as Kyzyl-Yatag and Qizil Yatāgh) is a village in Garmeh-ye Shomali Rural District, Kandovan District, Mianeh County, East Azerbaijan Province, Iran. At the 2006 census, its population was 136, in 27 families.
