= Zaren Kesh =

Zaren Kesh زرنكش
- Village
- Location within Iran
- Coordinates: 37°40′18″N 47°46′07″E
- Country: Iran
- Province: East Azerbaijan
- County: Meyaneh
- Bakhsh: Kandovan
- Rural District: Kandovan

Population (2006)
  - Total: 318
- Time zone: UTC+3:30 (IRST)
  - Summer (DST): UTC+4:30 (IRDT)

Zaren Kesh (Persian: زرنكش; also known as Zazen Kesh) is a village in Kandovan Rural District, Kandovan District, Meyaneh County, East Azerbaijan Province, Iran. At the 2006 census, its population was 318, in 69 families.
