= Hendelan =

Hendelan هندلان
- Village
- Location within Iran
- Coordinates: 37°38′08″N 47°47′58″E
- Country: Iran
- Province: East Azerbaijan
- County: Meyaneh
- Bakhsh: Kandovan
- Rural District: Kandovan

Population (2006)
  - Total: 234
- Time zone: UTC+3:30 (IRST)
  - Summer (DST): UTC+4:30 (IRDT)

Hendelan (Persian: هندلان, also Romanized as Hendelān) is a village in Kandovan Rural District, Kandovan District, Meyaneh County, East Azerbaijan Province, Iran. At the 2006 census, its population was 234, in 57 families.
