= Alanjareq =

Alanjareq النجارق
- Village
- Location within Iran
- Coordinates: 37°34′45″N 47°43′01″E
- Country: Iran
- Province: East Azerbaijan
- County: Meyaneh
- Bakhsh: Kandovan
- Rural District: Kandovan

Population (2006)
  - Total: 278
- Time zone: UTC+3:30 (IRST)
  - Summer (DST): UTC+4:30 (IRDT)

Alanjareq (Persian: النجارق, also Romanized as Alanjāreq; also known as Alenjālīq, Alīkhāraq, Alīnjāraq, Alīnjāreq, and Irinjālik) is a village in Kandovan Rural District, Kandovan District, Meyaneh County, East Azerbaijan Province, Iran. At the 2006 census, its population was 278, in 82 families.
