= Tarnab, Iran =

Tarnab ترناب
- Village
- Location within Iran
- Coordinates: 37°42′51″N 47°53′27″E
- Country: Iran
- Province: East Azerbaijan
- County: Meyaneh
- Bakhsh: Kandovan
- Rural District: Kandovan

Population (2006)
  - Total: 262
- Time zone: UTC+3:30 (IRST)

Tarnab (Persian: ترناب, also Romanized as Tarnāb; also known as Tarūnaz) is a village in Kandovan Rural District, Kandovan District, Meyaneh County, East Azerbaijan Province, Iran. At the 2006 census, its population was 262, in 50 families.
