= Mahiabad =

Mahiabad (Persian: ماهي اباد) may refer to:

- Mahiabad, East Azerbaijan
- Mahiabad, South Khorasan
