= Gavliq =

Gavliq گاوليق
- Village
- Location within Iran
- Coordinates: 37°35′38″N 47°36′10″E
- Country: Iran
- Province: East Azerbaijan
- County: Meyaneh
- Bakhsh: Kandovan
- Rural District: Tirchai

Population (2006)
  - Total: 50
- Time zone: UTC+3:30 (IRST)
  - Summer (DST): UTC+4:30 (IRDT)

Gavliq (Persian: گاوليق, also Romanized as Gāvlīq) is a village in Tirchai Rural District, Kandovan District, Meyaneh County, East Azerbaijan Province, Iran. At the 2006 census, its population was 50, in 21 families.
