= Sowti =

Sowti سوتي
- Village
- Location within Iran
- Coordinates: 37°47′00″N 47°56′00″E
- Country: Iran
- Province: East Azerbaijan
- County: Meyaneh
- Bakhsh: Kandovan
- Rural District: Garmeh-ye Shomali

Population (2006)
  - Total: 218
- Time zone: UTC+3:30 (IRST)
  - Summer (DST): UTC+4:30 (IRDT)

Sowti (Persian: سوتي, also Romanized as Sowtī) is a village in Garmeh-ye Shomali Rural District, Kandovan District, Meyaneh County, East Azerbaijan Province, Iran. At the 2006 census, its population was 218, in 44 families.
