= Hajj Khalil =

Hajj Khalil حاج خليل
- Village
- Location within Iran
- Coordinates: 37°48′57″N 48°02′06″E
- Country: Iran
- Province: East Azerbaijan
- County: Meyaneh
- Bakhsh: Kandovan
- Rural District: Garmeh-ye Shomali

Population (2006)
  - Total: 126
- Time zone: UTC+3:30 (IRST)
  - Summer (DST): UTC+4:30 (IRDT)

Hajj Khalil (Persian: حاج خليل, also Romanized as Ḩājj Khalīl; also known as Ḩājjī Khalīl) is a village in Garmeh-ye Shomali Rural District, Kandovan District, Meyaneh County, East Azerbaijan Province, Iran. At the 2006 census, its population was 126, in 30 families.
