= Qarah Hajji =

Qarah Hajji (Persian: قره حاجي), also known as Qarah Hajjilu, may refer to:

- Qarah Hajji-ye Olya
- Qarah Hajji-ye Sofla
