= Shivyar =

Shivyar (Persian: شيويار) may refer to:

- Shivyar, Charuymaq
- Shivyar, Meyaneh
