= Sowmaeh-ye Kabudin =

Sowmaeh-ye Kabudin صومعه كبودين
- Village
- Location within Iran
- Coordinates: 37°34′17″N 47°41′01″E
- Country: Iran
- Province: East Azerbaijan
- County: Meyaneh
- Bakhsh: Kandovan
- Rural District: Kandovan

Population (2006)
  - Total: 209
- Time zone: UTC+3:30 (IRST)
  - Summer (DST): UTC+4:30 (IRDT)

Sowmaeh-ye Kabudin (Persian: صومعه كبودين, also Romanized as Şowma‘eh-ye Kabūdīn) is a village in Kandovan Rural District, Kandovan District, Meyaneh County, East Azerbaijan Province, Iran. At the 2006 census, its population was 209, in 61 families.
