= Gemin =

Gemin or Gomeyn (Persian: گمين) may refer to:

- Gomeyn, East Azerbaijan
- Gemin, Kerman
