= Gangadik =

Gangadik گنگديك
- Village
- Location within Iran
- Coordinates: 37°40′23″N 47°42′51″E
- Country: Iran
- Province: East Azerbaijan
- County: Meyaneh
- Bakhsh: Kandovan
- Rural District: Kandovan

Population (2006)
  - Total: 53
- Time zone: UTC+3:30 (IRST)
  - Summer (DST): UTC+4:30 (IRDT)

Gangadik (Persian: گنگديك, also Romanized as Gangadīk; also known as Gan Gadūk) is a village in Kandovan Rural District, Kandovan District, Meyaneh County, East Azerbaijan Province, Iran. At the 2006 census, its population was 53, in 17 families.
