= Tush =

Tush may refer to:

- A subgroup of the Georgians: the Tushs or Tushetians
  - Tush, the Bats language of the Tush Bats people, who live in Tusheti
- A slang term for the buttocks
- A tusk
  - Any of the canine teeth of a horse
- "Tush" (ZZ Top song), a 1975 song by ZZ Top from their album Fandango!
- "Tush" (Ghostface Killah song), a 2004 song by Ghostface Killah from his album The Pretty Toney Album
- T.U.S.H., a 1970s Belgian rock-band featuring Dany Lademacher and Walter de Paduwa
- Tush (TV series), a 1980s variety show with Bill Tush

== Places ==
- Berkat Tush

== People ==
- Bill Tush (born 1948), American news journalist and humorist

== See also ==
- Tushmanlu (disambiguation)
- Tushy (disambiguation)
- Tush Tepe
- Tush Tush Tush
- Tush kiiz
