= Benaravan =

Benaravan بناروان
- Village
- Location within Iran
- Coordinates: 37°43′14″N 47°46′37″E
- Country: Iran
- Province: East Azerbaijan
- County: Meyaneh
- Bakhsh: Kandovan
- Rural District: Kandovan

Population (2006)
  - Total: 287
- Time zone: UTC+3:30 (IRST)
  - Summer (DST): UTC+4:30 (IRDT)

Benaravan (Persian: بناروان, also Romanized as Benāravān; also known as Banāowrān) is a village in Kandovan Rural District, Kandovan District, Meyaneh County, East Azerbaijan Province, Iran. At the 2006 census, its population was 287, in 70 families.
