= Khvajeh Deh =

Khvajeh Deh خواجه ده
- Village
- Location within Iran
- Coordinates: 37°34′04″N 47°39′00″E
- Country: Iran
- Province: East Azerbaijan
- County: Meyaneh
- Bakhsh: Kandovan
- Rural District: Tirchai

Population (2006)
  - Total: 191
- Time zone: UTC+3:30 (IRST)
  - Summer (DST): UTC+4:30 (IRDT)

Khvajeh Deh (Persian: خواجه ده, also Romanized as Khvājeh Deh) is a village in Tirchai Rural District, Kandovan District, Meyaneh County, East Azerbaijan Province, Iran. At the 2006 census, its population was 191, in 48 families.
