= Sorkheh Hesar, East Azerbaijan =

Sorkheh Hesar سرخه حصار
- Village
- Location within Iran
- Coordinates: 37°41′53″N 47°41′35″E
- Country: Iran
- Province: East Azerbaijan
- County: Meyaneh
- Bakhsh: Kandovan
- Rural District: Kandovan

Population (2006)
  - Total: 184
- Time zone: UTC+3:30 (IRST)
  - Summer (DST): UTC+4:30 (IRDT)

Sorkheh Hesar (Persian: سرخه حصار, also Romanized as Sorkheh Ḩeşār) is a village in Kandovan Rural District, Kandovan District, Meyaneh County, East Azerbaijan Province, Iran. At the 2006 census, its population was 184, in 29 families.
