= Kazaraj =

Kazaraj كزرج
- Village
- Location within Iran
- Coordinates: 37°35′47″N 47°41′44″E
- Country: Iran
- Province: East Azerbaijan
- County: Meyaneh
- Bakhsh: Kandovan
- Rural District: Kandovan

Population (2006)
  - Total: 291
- Time zone: UTC+3:30 (IRST)
  - Summer (DST): UTC+4:30 (IRDT)

Kazaraj (Persian: كزرج, also Romanized as Kaz̄araj) is a village in Kandovan Rural District, Kandovan District, Meyaneh County, East Azerbaijan Province, Iran. At the 2006 census, its population was 291, in 71 families.
