= Qeshlaq-e Salmani =

Qeshlaq-e Goll-e yurd(Salmani) (قشلاق گل یورد(سلماني
- Village
- Location within Iran
- Coordinates: 37°39′00″N 47°38′00″E
- Country: Iran
- Province: East Azerbaijan
- County: Meyaneh
- Bakhsh: Kandovan
- Rural District: Tirchai

Population (2006)
  - Total: 92
- Time zone: UTC+3:30 (IRST)
  - Summer (DST): UTC+4:30 (IRDT)

Qeshlaq-e Salmani (Persian: قشلاق سلماني, also Romanized as Qeshlāq-e Salmānī) is a village in Tirchai Rural District, Kandovan District, Meyaneh County, East Azerbaijan Province, Iran. At the 2006 census, its population was 92, in 20 families.
