= Nowduzaq =

Nowduzaq نودوزق
- Village
- Location within Iran
- Coordinates: 37°36′02″N 47°40′48″E
- Country: Iran
- Province: East Azerbaijan
- County: Meyaneh
- Bakhsh: Kandovan
- Rural District: Tirchai

Population (2006)
  - Total: 189
- Time zone: UTC+3:30 (IRST)
  - Summer (DST): UTC+4:30 (IRDT)

Nowduzaq (Persian: نودوزق, also Romanized as Nowdūzaq) is a village in Tirchai Rural District, Kandovan District, Meyaneh County, East Azerbaijan Province, Iran. At the 2006 census, its population was 189, in 53 families.
