= Dali Qiz =

Dali Qiz دلي قيز
- Village
- Location within Iran
- Coordinates: 37°47′38″N 47°56′11″E
- Country: Iran
- Province: East Azerbaijan
- County: Meyaneh
- Bakhsh: Kandovan
- Rural District: Garmeh-ye Shomali

Population (2006)
  - Total: 286
- Time zone: UTC+3:30 (IRST)
  - Summer (DST): UTC+4:30 (IRDT)

Dali Qiz (Persian: دلي قيز, also Romanized as Dalī Qez; also known as Dalīqez) is a village in Garmeh-ye Shomali Rural District, Kandovan District, Meyaneh County, East Azerbaijan Province, Iran. At the 2006 census, its population was 286, in 60 families.
