= Dishab =

Dishab ديشاب
- Village
- Location within Iran
- Coordinates: 37°37′44″N 47°36′47″E
- Country: Iran
- Province: East Azerbaijan
- County: Meyaneh
- Bakhsh: Kandovan
- Rural District: Tirchai

Population (2006)
  - Total: 127
- Time zone: UTC+3:30 (IRST)
  - Summer (DST): UTC+4:30 (IRDT)

Dishab (Persian: ديشاب, also Romanized as Dīshāb; also known as Deshāb) is a village in Tirchai Rural District, Kandovan District, Meyaneh County, East Azerbaijan Province, Iran. At the 2006 census, its population was 127, in 45 families.
