= Yal Qeshlaqi =

Yal Qeshlaqi يال قشلاقي
- Village
- Location within Iran
- Coordinates: 37°45′05″N 47°57′36″E
- Country: Iran
- Province: East Azerbaijan
- County: Meyaneh
- Bakhsh: Kandovan
- Rural District: Garmeh-ye Shomali

Population (2006)
  - Total: 57
- Time zone: UTC+3:30 (IRST)
  - Summer (DST): UTC+4:30 (IRDT)

Yal Qeshlaqi (Persian: يال قشلاقي, also Romanized as Yāl Qeshlāqī; also known as Yār Qeshlāqī) is a village in Garmeh-ye Shomali Rural District, Kandovan District, Meyaneh County, East Azerbaijan Province, Iran. At the 2006 census, its population was 57, in 13 families.
