= Qeshlaq-e Supurgali =

Qeshlaq-e Supurgali قشلاق سوپورگلي
- Village
- Location within Iran
- Coordinates: 37°39′24″N 47°37′01″E
- Country: Iran
- Province: East Azerbaijan
- County: Meyaneh
- Bakhsh: Kandovan
- Rural District: Tirchai

Population (2006)
  - Total: 97
- Time zone: UTC+3:30 (IRST)
  - Summer (DST): UTC+4:30 (IRDT)

Qeshlaq-e Supurgali (Persian: قشلاق سوپورگلي, also Romanized as Qeshlāq-e Sūpūrgalī; also known as Qeshlāq-e Arān, Qeshlāq-e Sopūrgalū, and Qeshlāq-e Sūpergalū) is a village in Tirchai Rural District, Kandovan District, Meyaneh County, East Azerbaijan Province, Iran. At the 2006 census, its population was 97, in 23 families.
