= Neqlan =

Neqlan نقلان
- Village
- Location within Iran
- Coordinates: 37°33′42″N 47°36′01″E
- Country: Iran
- Province: East Azerbaijan
- County: Meyaneh
- Bakhsh: Kandovan
- Rural District: Tirchai

Population (2006)
  - Total: 101
- Time zone: UTC+3:30 (IRST)
  - Summer (DST): UTC+4:30 (IRDT)

Neqlan (Persian: نقلان, also Romanized as Neqlān) is a village in Tirchai Rural District, Kandovan District, Meyaneh County, East Azerbaijan Province, Iran. At the 2006 census, its population was 101, in 30 families.
