= Neshlandeh =

Neshlandeh نشلانده
- Village
- Location within Iran
- Coordinates: 37°40′48″N 47°41′58″E
- Country: Iran
- Province: East Azerbaijan
- County: Meyaneh
- Bakhsh: Kandovan
- Rural District: Kandovan

Population (2006)
  - Total: 163
- Time zone: UTC+3:30 (IRST)
  - Summer (DST): UTC+4:30 (IRDT)

Neshlandeh (Persian: نشلانده, also Romanized as Neshlāndeh) is a village in Kandovan Rural District, Kandovan District, Meyaneh County, East Azerbaijan Province, Iran. At the 2006 census, its population was 163, in 30 families.
