= Qarah Hajji-ye Olya =

Qarah Hajji-ye Olya قره حاجي عليا
- Village
- Location within Iran
- Coordinates: 37°41′15″N 47°45′14″E
- Country: Iran
- Province: East Azerbaijan
- County: Meyaneh
- Bakhsh: Kandovan
- Rural District: Kandovan

Population (2006)
  - Total: 60
- Time zone: UTC+3:30 (IRST)
  - Summer (DST): UTC+4:30 (IRDT)

Qarah Hajji-ye Olya (Persian: قره حاجي عليا, also Romanized as Qarah Ḩājjī-ye ‘Olyā; also known as Qarah Ḩājjīlū-ye Bālā and Qarah Ḩājjīlū-ye ‘Olyā) is a village in Kandovan Rural District, Kandovan District, Meyaneh County, East Azerbaijan Province, Iran. At the 2006 census, its population was 60, in 10 families.
