= Avenliq =

Village in East Azerbaijan province, Iran

Avenliq Persian: اونليق
- Village
- Location within Iran
- Coordinates: 37°32′11″N 47°39′06″E
- Country: Iran
- Province: East Azerbaijan
- County: Mianeh
- District: Kandovan
- Rural District: Tirchai

Population (2016)
  - Total: 1,774
- Time zone: UTC+3:30 (IRST)

Avenliq (Persian: اونليق) (Note: Also romanized as Āvenlīq and Avenlīq; also known as Avīnlīq) is a village in Tirchai Rural District of Kandovan District in Mianeh County, East Azerbaijan province, Iran.

== Demographics ==
=== Population ===
At the time of the 2006 National Census, the village's population was 1,647 in 477 households. The following census in 2011 counted 1,797 people in 530 households. The 2016 census measured the population of the village as 1,774 people in 564 households. It was the most populous village in its rural district.
