= Sonqorabad, East Azerbaijan =

Village in East Azerbaijan province, Iran

Sonqorabad Persian: سنقراباد
- Village
- Location within Iran
- Coordinates: 37°45′53″N 47°54′57″E
- Country: Iran
- Province: East Azerbaijan
- County: Mianeh
- District: Kandovan
- Rural District: Garmeh-ye Shomali

Population (2016)
  - Total: 435
- Time zone: UTC+3:30 (IRST)

Sonqorabad (Persian: سنقراباد) (Note: Also romanized as Sonqorābād) is a village in Garmeh-ye Shomali Rural District of Kandovan District in Mianeh County, East Azerbaijan province, Iran.

== Demographics ==
=== Population ===
At the time of the 2006 National Census, the village's population was 444 in 108 households. The following census in 2011 counted 422 people in 109 households. The 2016 census measured the population of the village as 435 people in 122 households.
