= Qeshlaq-e Musa Beyg =

Village in East Azerbaijan province, Iran

Qeshlaq-e Musa Beyg Persian: قشلاق موسي بيگ
- Village
- Location within Iran
- Coordinates: 37°39′38″N 47°36′08″E
- Country: Iran
- Province: East Azerbaijan
- County: Mianeh
- District: Kandovan
- Rural District: Tirchai

Population (2016)
  - Total: 258
- Time zone: UTC+3:30 (IRST)

Qeshlaq-e Musa Beyg (Persian: قشلاق موسي بيگ) (Note: Also romanized as Qeshlāq-e Mūsá Beyg; also known as Qeshlāq-e Mūsá Beyglū) is a village in Tirchai Rural District of Kandovan District in Mianeh County, East Azerbaijan province, Iran.

== Demographics ==
=== Population ===
At the time of the 2006 National Census, the village's population was 288 in 63 households. The following census in 2011 counted 276 people in 75 households. The 2016 census measured the population of the village as 258 people in 80 households.
