= Eyvaraq =

Village in East Azerbaijan province, Iran

Eyvaraq Persian: ايورق
- Village
- Location within Iran
- Coordinates: 37°39′10″N 47°34′54″E
- Country: Iran
- Province: East Azerbaijan
- County: Mianeh
- District: Kandovan
- Rural District: Tirchai

Population (2016)
  - Total: 392
- Time zone: UTC+3:30 (IRST)

Eyvaraq (Persian: ايورق) is a village in Tirchai Rural District of Kandovan District in Mianeh County, East Azerbaijan province, Iran.

== Demographics ==
=== Population ===
At the time of the 2006 National Census, the village's population was 506 in 114 households. The following census in 2011 counted 465 people in 136 households. The 2016 census measured the population of the village as 392 people in 115 households.
