= Qarah Hajji-ye Sofla =

Qarah Hajji-ye Sofla قره حاجي سفلي
- Village
- Location within Iran
- Coordinates: 37°41′10″N 47°45′24″E
- Country: Iran
- Province: East Azerbaijan
- County: Meyaneh
- Bakhsh: Kandovan
- Rural District: Kandovan

Population (2006)
  - Total: 45
- Time zone: UTC+3:30 (IRST)
  - Summer (DST): UTC+4:30 (IRDT)

Qarah Hajji-ye Sofla (Persian: قره حاجي سفلي, also Romanized as Qarah Ḩājjī-ye Soflá; also known as Qarah Ḩājjīlū-ye Pā'īn and Qarah Ḩājjīlū-ye Soflá) is a village in Kandovan Rural District, Kandovan District, Meyaneh County, East Azerbaijan Province, Iran. At the 2006 census, its population was 45, in 8 families.
