= Tajareh Rud =

Tajareh Rud تجره رود
- Village
- Location within Iran
- Coordinates: 37°38′20″N 47°38′22″E
- Country: Iran
- Province: East Azerbaijan
- County: Meyaneh
- Bakhsh: Kandovan
- Rural District: Tirchai

Population (2006)
  - Total: 109
- Time zone: UTC+3:30 (IRST)
  - Summer (DST): UTC+4:30 (IRDT)

Tajareh Rud (Persian: تجره رود, also Romanized as Tajareh Rūd; also known as Tajaroq) is a village in Tirchai Rural District, Kandovan District, Meyaneh County, East Azerbaijan Province, Iran. At the 2006 census, its population was 109, in 26 families.
