= Cheshmeh Kesh =

Village in East Azerbaijan province, Iran

Cheshmeh Kesh Persian: چشمه کش
- Village
- Location within Iran
- Coordinates: 37°41′07″N 47°53′09″E
- Country: Iran
- Province: East Azerbaijan
- County: Mianeh
- District: Kandovan
- Rural District: Kandovan

Population (2016)
  - Total: 477
- Time zone: UTC+3:30 (IRST)

Cheshmeh Kesh (Persian: چشمه كش) (Note: Also known as Sārī Qomīsh (ساري قميش) and Sarı Qəmiş (Turkish)) is a village in Kandovan Rural District of Kandovan District in Mianeh County, East Azerbaijan province, Iran.

== Demographics ==
=== Population ===
At the time of the 2006 National Census, the village's population was 413 in 87 households. The following census in 2011 counted 445 people in 126 households. The 2016 census measured the population of the village as 477 people in 146 households.
