= Ney Baghi =

Village in East Azerbaijan province, Iran

Ney Baghi Persian: ني باغي
- Village
- Location within Iran
- Coordinates: 37°44′03″N 47°55′48″E
- Country: Iran
- Province: East Azerbaijan
- County: Mianeh
- District: Kandovan
- Rural District: Garmeh-ye Shomali

Population (2016)
  - Total: 457
- Time zone: UTC+3:30 (IRST)

Ney Baghi (Persian: ني باغي) (Note: Also romanized as Ney Bāghī) is a village in Garmeh-ye Shomali Rural District of Kandovan District in Mianeh County, East Azerbaijan province, Iran.

== Demographics ==
=== Population ===
At the time of the 2006 National Census, the village's population was 496 in 98 households. The following census in 2011 counted 475 people in 146 households. The 2016 census measured the population of the village as 457 people in 143 households.
