= Kandovan, Meyaneh =

Kandovan كندوان
- Village
- Location within Iran
- Coordinates: 37°35′57″N 47°49′36″E
- Country: Iran
- Province: East Azerbaijan
- County: Meyaneh
- Bakhsh: Kandovan
- Rural District: Kandovan

Population (2006)
  - Total: 424
- Time zone: UTC+3:30 (IRST)
  - Summer (DST): UTC+4:30 (IRDT)

Kandovan (Persian: كندوان, also Romanized as Kandovān) is a village in Kandovan Rural District, Kandovan District, Meyaneh County, East Azerbaijan Province, Iran. As of the 2006 census, its population was 424, in 103 families.
