= Tevin, Kandovan =

Village in East Azerbaijan province, Iran

Tevin Persian: طوين
- Village
- Location within Iran
- Coordinates: 37°45′37″N 48°04′10″E
- Country: Iran
- Province: East Azerbaijan
- County: Mianeh
- District: Kandovan
- Rural District: Garmeh-ye Shomali

Population (2016)
  - Total: 333
- Time zone: UTC+3:30 (IRST)

Tevin (Persian: طوين) (Note: Also romanized as Ţevīn and Ţovīn; also known as Ţīvīūn and Ţīvyūn) is a village in Garmeh-ye Shomali Rural District of Kandovan District in Mianeh County, East Azerbaijan province, Iran.

== Demographics ==
=== Population ===
At the time of the 2006 National Census, the village's population was 594 in 118 households. The following census in 2011 counted 543 people in 142 households. The 2016 census measured the population of the village as 333 people in 114 households.
