= Ishlaq =

Village in East Azerbaijan province, Iran

Ishlaq Persian: ايشلق
- Village
- Location within Iran
- Coordinates: 37°36′14″N 47°37′20″E
- Country: Iran
- Province: East Azerbaijan
- County: Mianeh
- District: Kandovan
- Rural District: Tirchai

Population (2016)
  - Total: 380
- Time zone: UTC+3:30 (IRST)

Ishlaq (Persian: ايشلق) (Note: Also romanized as Eshlaq, Eshleq, and Īshlaq; also known as Ashlogh) is a village in, and the capital of, Tirchai Rural District in Kandovan District of Mianeh County, East Azerbaijan province, Iran.

== Demographics ==
=== Population ===
At the time of the 2006 National Census, the village's population was 461 in 171 households. The following census in 2011 counted 388 people in 148 households. The 2016 census measured the population of the village as 380 people in 160 households.
