= Avin-e Masjedlu =

Village in East Azerbaijan province, Iran

Avin-e Masjedlu Persian: اوين مسجدلو
- Village
- Location within Iran
- Coordinates: 37°44′03″N 47°47′54″E
- Country: Iran
- Province: East Azerbaijan
- County: Mianeh
- District: Kandovan
- Rural District: Kandovan

Population (2016)
  - Total: 658
- Time zone: UTC+3:30 (IRST)

Avin-e Masjedlu (Persian: اوين مسجدلو) (Note: Also romanized as Āvīn-e Masjedlū; also known as Āvīn) is a village in Kandovan Rural District of Kandovan District in Mianeh County, East Azerbaijan province, Iran.

== Demographics ==
=== Population ===
At the time of the 2006 National Census, the village's population was 617 in 153 households. The following census in 2011 counted 673 people in 250 households. The 2016 census measured the population of the village as 658 people in 204 households.
