= Khanqah, Mianeh =

Village in East Azerbaijan province, Iran

Khanqah Persian: خانقاه
- Village
- Location within Iran
- Coordinates: 37°42′35″N 47°45′41″E
- Country: Iran
- Province: East Azerbaijan
- County: Mianeh
- District: Kandovan
- Rural District: Kandovan

Population (2016)
  - Total: 827
- Time zone: UTC+3:30 (IRST)

Khanqah (Persian: خانقاه) (Note: Also romanized as Khānqāh) is a village in Kandovan Rural District of Kandovan District in Mianeh County, East Azerbaijan province, Iran.

== Demographics ==
=== Population ===
At the time of the 2006 National Census, the village's population was 978 in 174 households. The following census in 2011 counted 752 people in 194 households. The 2016 census measured the population of the village as 827 people in 277 households. It was the most populous village in its rural district.
