= Livanlu =

Village in East Azerbaijan province, Iran

Livanlu Persian: ليوانلو
- Village
- Location within Iran
- Coordinates: 37°48′41″N 47°56′20″E
- Country: Iran
- Province: East Azerbaijan
- County: Mianeh
- District: Kandovan
- Rural District: Garmeh-ye Shomali

Population (2016)
  - Total: 328
- Time zone: UTC+3:30 (IRST)

Livanlu (Persian: ليوانلو) (Note: Also romanized as Līvānlū; also known as Dīvānleq and Duānlu) is a village in Garmeh-ye Shomali Rural District of Kandovan District in Mianeh County, East Azerbaijan province, Iran.

== Demographics ==
=== Population ===
At the time of the 2006 National Census, the village's population was 442 in 83 households. The following census in 2011 counted 429 people in 122 households. The 2016 census measured the population of the village as 328 people in 106 households.
