= Molk =

Village in East Azerbaijan province, Iran

Molk Persian: ملك
- Village
- Location within Iran
- Coordinates: 37°44′41″N 47°57′13″E
- Country: Iran
- Province: East Azerbaijan
- County: Mianeh
- District: Kandovan
- Rural District: Garmeh-ye Shomali

Population (2016)
  - Total: 367
- Time zone: UTC+3:30 (IRST)

Molk (Persian: ملك) is a village in Garmeh-ye Shomali Rural District of Kandovan District in Mianeh County, East Azerbaijan province, Iran.

== Demographics ==
=== Population ===
At the time of the 2006 National Census, the village's population was 414 in 93 households. The following census in 2011 counted 430 people in 136 households. The 2016 census measured the population of the village as 367 people in 129 households.
