= Fandoqlu =

Village in East Azerbaijan province, Iran

Fandoqlu Persian: فندقلو
- Village
- Location within Iran
- Coordinates: 37°45′48″N 47°50′14″E
- Country: Iran
- Province: East Azerbaijan
- County: Mianeh
- District: Kandovan
- Rural District: Kandovan

Population (2016)
  - Total: 391
- Time zone: UTC+3:30 (IRST)

Fandoqlu (Persian: فندقلو) (Note: Also romanized as Fandoqlū; also known as Qandoqlū) is a village in Kandovan Rural District of Kandovan District in Mianeh County, East Azerbaijan province, Iran.

== Demographics ==
=== Population ===
At the time of the 2006 National Census, the village's population was 326 in 81 households. The following census in 2011 counted 409 people in 131 households. The 2016 census measured the population of the village as 391 people in 131 households.
