= Balesin, Mianeh =

Village in East Azerbaijan province, Iran

Balesin Persian: بالسين
- Village
- Location within Iran
- Coordinates: 37°38′29″N 47°35′48″E
- Country: Iran
- Province: East Azerbaijan
- County: Mianeh
- District: Kandovan
- Rural District: Tirchai

Population (2016)
  - Total: 1,115
- Time zone: UTC+3:30 (IRST)

Balesin (Persian: بالسين) (Note: Also romanized as Bālesīn and Bālsīn; also known as Balin) is a village in Tirchai Rural District of Kandovan District in Mianeh County, East Azerbaijan province, Iran.

== Demographics ==
=== Population ===
At the time of the 2006 National Census, the village's population was 1,323 in 328 households. The following census in 2011 counted 1,096 people in 347 households. The 2016 census measured the population of the village as 1,115 people in 365 households.
