= Neshaq =

Village in East Azerbaijan province, Iran

Neshaq Persian: نشق
- Village
- Location within Iran
- Coordinates: 37°41′26″N 47°40′06″E
- Country: Iran
- Province: East Azerbaijan
- County: Mianeh
- District: Kandovan
- Rural District: Kandovan

Population (2016)
  - Total: 404
- Time zone: UTC+3:30 (IRST)

Neshaq (Persian: نشق) is a village in Kandovan Rural District of Kandovan District in Mianeh County, East Azerbaijan province, Iran.

== Demographics ==
=== Population ===
At the time of the 2006 National Census, the village's population was 460 in 110 households. The following census in 2011 counted 420 people in 143 households. The 2016 census measured the population of the village as 404 people in 162 households.
