= Armudaq =

Village in East Azerbaijan province, Iran

Armudaq Persian: ارموداق
- Village
- Location within Iran
- Coordinates: 37°47′01″N 47°59′29″E
- Country: Iran
- Province: East Azerbaijan
- County: Mianeh
- District: Kandovan
- Rural District: Garmeh-ye Shomali

Population (2016)
  - Total: 603
- Time zone: UTC+3:30 (IRST)

Armudaq (Persian: ارموداق) (Note: Also romanized as Ārmūdāq) is a village in, and the capital of, Garmeh-ye Shomali Rural District in Kandovan District of Mianeh County, East Azerbaijan province, Iran.

== Demographics ==
=== Population ===
At the time of the 2006 National Census, the village's population was 943 in 204 households. The following census in 2011 counted 711 people in 197 households. The 2016 census measured the population of the village as 603 people in 185 households. It was the most populous village in its rural district.
