= Khalaflu =

Khalaflu (Persian: خلف لو) may refer to:

- Khalaflu, Ardabil
- Khalaflu, Ahar, East Azerbaijan Province
- Khalaflu, Meyaneh, East Azerbaijan Province
- Khalaflu, Zanjan
