= Khalifehlu, Meyaneh =

Khalifehlu خليفه لو
- Village
- Location within Iran
- Coordinates: 37°39′58″N 47°34′39″E
- Country: Iran
- Province: East Azerbaijan
- County: Meyaneh
- Bakhsh: Kandovan
- Rural District: Tirchai

Population (2006)
  - Total: 148
- Time zone: UTC+3:30 (IRST)
  - Summer (DST): UTC+4:30 (IRDT)

Khalifehlu (Persian: خليفه لو, also Romanized as Khalīfehlū; also known as Khalaflū) is a village in Tirchai Rural District, Kandovan District, Meyaneh County, East Azerbaijan Province, Iran. At the 2006 census, its population was 148, in 30 families.
