= Tushmanlu =

Tushmanlu or Tush Manlu (Persian: توشمانلو) may refer to:

- Tushmanlu, Ardabil
- Tush Manlu, East Azerbaijan
