= Tark, East Azerbaijan =

City in East Azerbaijan province, Iran

Tark Persian: تَرک
- City
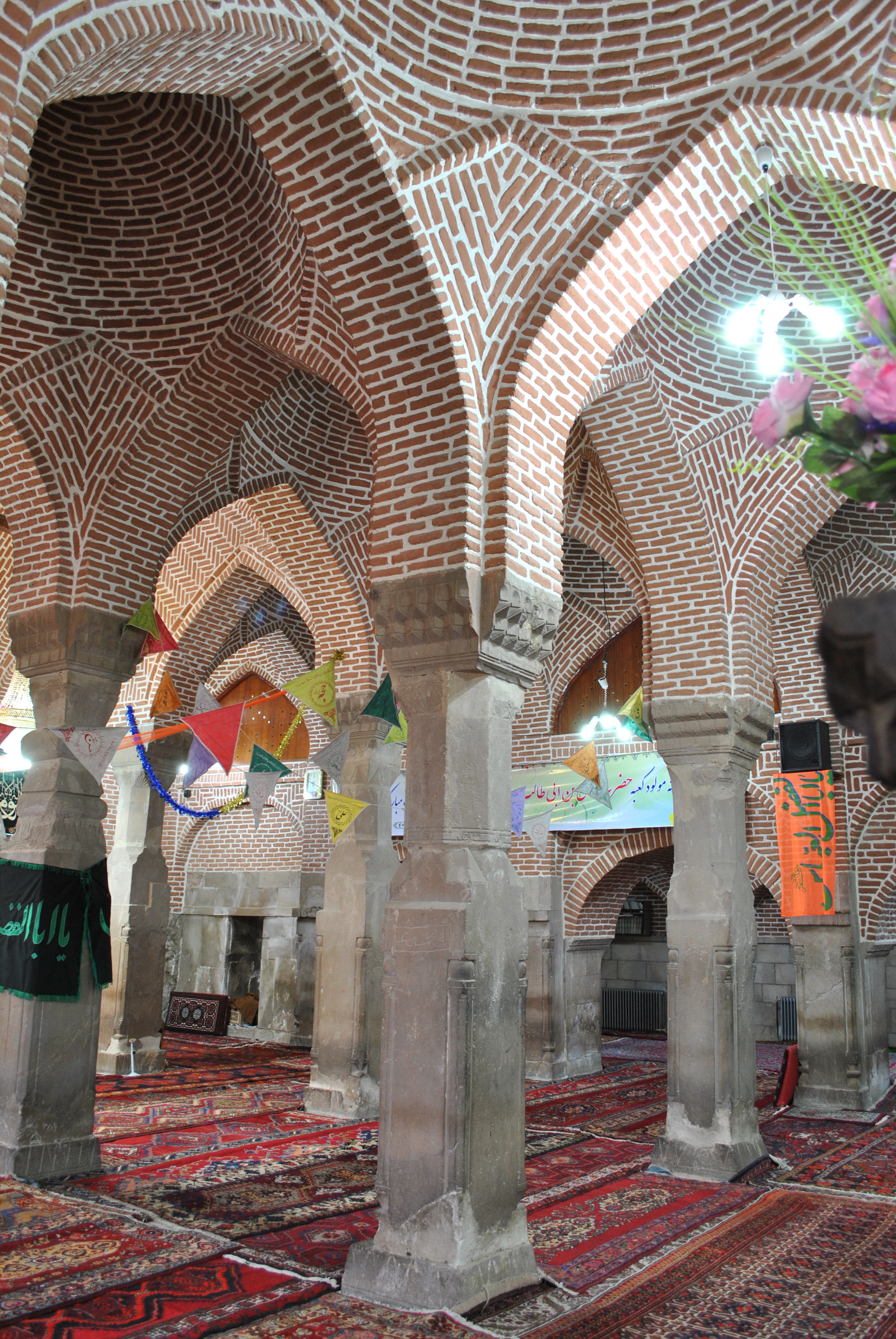
- Stone Mosque of Tark

- Location within Iran
- Coordinates: 37°36′58″N 47°46′13″E
- Country: Iran
- Province: East Azerbaijan
- County: Mianeh
- District: Kandovan

Population (2016)
  - Total: 2,031
- Time zone: UTC+3:30 (IRST)

Tark (Persian: تَرک) (Note: Also romanized as Tork) is a city in, and the capital of, Kandovan District in Mianeh County, East Azerbaijan province, Iran. It also serves as the administrative center for Kandovan Rural District.

== Demographics ==
=== Population ===
At the time of the 2006 National Census, the city's population was 1,869 in 456 households. The following census in 2011 counted 2,406 people in 532 households. The 2016 census measured the population of the city as 2,031 people in 602 households.
