= Shivyar, Mianeh =

Village in East Azerbaijan province, Iran

Shivyar Persian: شيويار
- Village
- Location within Iran
- Coordinates: 37°36′48″N 47°38′22″E
- Country: Iran
- Province: East Azerbaijan
- County: Mianeh
- District: Kandovan
- Rural District: Tirchai

Population (2016)
  - Total: 262
- Time zone: UTC+3:30 (IRST)

Shivyar (Persian: شيويار) (Note: Also romanized as Shīvyār) is a village in Tirchai Rural District of Kandovan District in Mianeh County, East Azerbaijan province, Iran.

== Demographics ==
=== Population ===
At the time of the 2006 National Census, the village's population was 266 in 86 households. The following census in 2011 counted 209 people in 70 households. The 2016 census measured the population of the village as 262 people in 94 households.
