= Gomeyn, East Azerbaijan =

Gomeyn گمين
- Village
- Location within Iran
- Coordinates: 37°40′25″N 47°50′26″E
- Country: Iran
- Province: East Azerbaijan
- County: Meyaneh
- Bakhsh: Kandovan
- Rural District: Kandovan

Population (2006)
  - Total: 74
- Time zone: UTC+3:30 (IRST)
  - Summer (DST): UTC+4:30 (IRDT)

Gomeyn (Persian: گمين; also known as Kamī, Kemi, Komī, and Kumsin) is a village in Kandovan Rural District, Kandovan District, Meyaneh County, East Azerbaijan Province, Iran. At the 2006 census, its population was 74, in 15 families.
