= Mahiabad, East Azerbaijan =

Village in East Azerbaijan province, Iran

Mahiabad Persian: ماهي اباد
- Village
- Location within Iran
- Coordinates: 37°32′40″N 47°42′52″E
- Country: Iran
- Province: East Azerbaijan
- County: Mianeh
- District: Kandovan
- Rural District: Kandovan

Population (2016)
  - Total: 474
- Time zone: UTC+3:30 (IRST)

Mahiabad (Persian: ماهي اباد) (Note: Also romanized as Māhīābād) is a village in Kandovan Rural District of Kandovan District in Mianeh County, East Azerbaijan province, Iran.

== Demographics ==
=== Population ===
At the time of the 2006 National Census, the village's population was 468 in 104 households. The following census in 2011 counted 528 people in 133 households. The 2016 census measured the population of the village as 474 people in 133 households.
