= Tajaroq, Mianeh =

Village in East Azerbaijan province, Iran

Tajaroq Persian: تجرق
- Village
- Location within Iran
- Coordinates: 37°44′56″N 47°58′54″E
- Country: Iran
- Province: East Azerbaijan
- County: Mianeh
- District: Kandovan
- Rural District: Garmeh-ye Shomali

Population (2016)
  - Total: 512
- Time zone: UTC+3:30 (IRST)

Tajaroq (Persian: تجرق) is a village in Garmeh-ye Shomali Rural District of Kandovan District in Mianeh County, East Azerbaijan province, Iran.

== Demographics ==
=== Population ===
At the time of the 2006 National Census, the village's population was 653 in 141 households. The following census in 2011 counted 603 people in 166 households. The 2016 census measured the population of the village as 512 people in 156 households.
