= Tush Manlu, East Azerbaijan =

Village in East Azerbaijan province, Iran

Tush Manlu Persian: توشمانلو
- Village
- Location within Iran
- Coordinates: 37°47′28″N 47°57′42″E
- Country: Iran
- Province: East Azerbaijan
- County: Mianeh
- District: Kandovan
- Rural District: Garmeh-ye Shomali

Population (2016)
  - Total: 418
- Time zone: UTC+3:30 (IRST)

Tush Manlu (Persian: توشمانلو) (Note: Also romanized as Tūsh Mānlū and Tūshmānlū) is a village in Garmeh-ye Shomali Rural District of Kandovan District in Mianeh County, East Azerbaijan province, Iran.

== Demographics ==
=== Population ===
At the time of the 2006 National Census, the village's population was 673 in 119 households. The following census in 2011 counted 408 people in 123 households. The 2016 census measured the population of the village as 418 people in 118 households.

== Tushmanlu offstream reservoir gravity dam ==
=== Introduction ===
Tushmanlu is famous for its apple. Most of the farmers in Tushmanlu produce high quality apples.

Old Tushmanlu offstream reservoir gravity dam was constructed around the village of Tushmanlu in northern part of Mianeh, East Azerbaijan early after Islamic revolution of Iran in 1357 Iranian year. Regarding the high quality of soil and water and proper weather condition, the best quality of gardens crops has persuaded farmers to develop the area of their gardens. On the other hand, because of the poor design and construction of the traditional existing dam, studies of building a higher and more stable dam instead of old dam started by Pars Ray Ab Consulting Engineering Company in 1379 Iranian year.

=== Department ===
Water Resources Development and Dam Construction General Specifications of Dam: Water transmission system: Water transmission canal with length of 6 km and capacity of 1 cms Type of dam: Earthfill dam with impervious clay core Foundation seepage control system: Plastic concrete cutoff wall Height of dam: 20 m above riverbed Spillway: Free flow spillway in right abutment Area of the gardens covered by dam reservoir: 500 ha

=== Client ===
East Azerbaijan and Ardebil Regional Water company - East Azerbaijan Water Affairs Administration.

=== Project Progress ===
Studies of project started in 1379 and completed in 1381. Construction works of project achieved during 1381 to 1384 and the project has been under operation since the spring of 1384.
