= Tushy =

Tushy may refer to:

- A slang word for buttocks, derived from the Yiddish tuchas
- Tushy.com, a pornographic film brand owned by Vixen Media Group

== See also ==
- Toosheh, a satellite filecasting technology deployed in Iran and the Middle East
- Tushi, a village in Iran
- Tush (disambiguation)
