= Komi Akakpo =

Togolese footballer

Personal information
- Full name: Komi Biova Akakpo
- Date of birth: 31 December 1995 (age 30)
- Place of birth: Lomé, Togo
- Height: 1.80 m (5 ft 11 in)
- Position: Defensive midfielder

Senior career*
Years	Team	Apps	(Gls)
2013	Agaza		
2014-2015	Anges FC		
2017-2019	Rakhine United	42	(2)
2020	Chin United	10	(2)

International career
2014	Togo under-20	3	(0)
- * Club domestic league appearances and goals

Komi Biova Akakpo (born 31 December 1995), commonly known as Agarawa, is a Togolese professional footballer who last played as a defensive midfielder.

== Career ==
Akakpo started his career at Agaza before playing with Anges FC in the 2014 Togolese Championnat National. During this time, he was called up to the Togo under-20 national team for the 2015 African U-20 Championship Qualifiers.

At the end of 2016, he signed with Rakhine United for the 2017 Myanmar National League season. He continued with them for the 2018 season and was selected to play in the MNL All-Stars team in their match against Leeds United in Yangon.

He returned to Myanmar for the 2020 Myanmar National League, where he captained Chin United.

== Career statistics ==
As of end of 2020 season

Appearances and goals by club, season and competition
Club	Season	League			Total	
Club	Season	Division	Apps	Goals	Apps	Goals
Rakhine United	2017	Myanmar National League	21	0	21	0
Rakhine United	2018	Myanmar National League	21	2	21	2
Rakhine United	Total		42	2	42	2
Chin United	2020	Myanmar National League	10	2	10	2
Chin United	Total		10	2	10	2
Career total			52	4	52	4
