= List of Komi Can't Communicate characters =

The manga series Komi Can't Communicate features an extensive cast of characters created by Tomohito Oda. The story mostly takes place at the elite Itan Private High School, and follows Shōko Komi, who is suffering from a crippling social anxiety disorder also known as sociophobia on her quest to make 100 friends with the help of her classmate Hitohito Tadano.

The names of the majority of the characters are puns or plays on words, usually related to their most defining character trait. The Japanese spellings are taken from the official fanbook.

== Main characters ==
Shōko Komi (古見 硝子, Komi Shōko)
Voiced by: Aoi Koga (Japanese); Amber Lee Connors (English)
Portrayed by: Elaiza Ikeda
Komi is a high school girl who suffers from extreme social anxiety, which prevents her from communicating with other people. Komi has long, black hair with a purple tinge, almond-shaped eyes, and described as extremely beautiful. Komi is so shy and nervous that she normally appears expressionless, despite still feeling emotions like anyone else. In most circumstances, her face is usually switched to a simplified style dominated by very large, round eyes. Even when feeling emotions such as being anxious, shocked, or surprised. When Komi is excited, cat ears tend to appear on her head, of which Komi ^{Ch. 35} and sometimes others^{Ch. 196} are aware. She tends to motivate herself by pumping both fists.
Due to her communication disorder, Komi never had been able to make friends in elementary and middle school. Because of this, she feels lonely when entering high school. Which is what contributed to her dream of befriending 100 people. Due to Komi's beauty and aristocratic-like demeanor, she is very popular among her classmates and quickly garners an adoring, but distanced following. Komi's silence tends to be mistaken as stiff properness, despite her simply being too afraid to talk. Her big-eyed, anxious look is also often mistaken for anger, further deterring other people from becoming close to her. Initially, Komi is completely unable to speak with anyone outside her family. And even among them, she speaks so rarely that her brother dismisses the possibility of having heard her voice.^{Ch. 49} When Komi tries to speak, she either freezes completely or stutters severely.
Over the course of the story, she slowly learns to communicate and talk to others. She primarily does so by writing her thoughts on notebooks (a method suggested by Tadano) and becomes her primary form of communication for most interactions. Improving with time, she starts to speak short sentences during her first school year. By her second year, she becomes able to speak for longer periods when emotionally invested^{Ch. 226–228}, though with slow speech and pauses. By her third year, she can speak more competently with little stuttering, and hold more natural conversations, even amongst a group of people. She becomes less stiff and begins to show more physical emotion and facial expressions, even showing natural smiles.
Her social anxiety usually makes her very insecure and overthinking her actions.^{Ch. 35, 100} She is also quite pessimistic about herself, usually believing that any misunderstandings are a result of her own fault. And despite everyone's praises of her, she still tends to consider herself to be boring and uninteresting, and unworthy to be with Tadano.
Hitohito Tadano was the first one (outside her family) to recognize her social anxiety, and who became her first ever friend since childhood. Tadano has since helped her find more friends and overcome her social anxiety, with the assistance of Najimi. Komi quickly develops romantic feelings for Tadano, but is for the longest time too shy and worried of her self-value to express her feelings properly. Not having the confidence that, in her eyes, someone as "amazing" as Tadano would want to be with someone as "boring" as her. Upon learning that her friend Manbagi has also developed feelings for Tadano, Komi admits that while she doesn't like that realization, she won't dissuade her from seeking him, since she still values their friendship. Both opting to mutually support each other in their feelings for Tadano, despite Komi knowing the idea of losing Tadano to someone else still hurts her. Only after Tadano confesses his own feelings to her, she becomes able to accept her own desires, and the two become a couple ^{Ch. 300–304}. After which, Komi grows to move past her previous passiveness and assert her affections for Tadano, and desiring affection from him. Over the course of their relationship, Komi becomes more flirtatious, being more playful, and even teasing him.^{Ch. 349, 355, 359}
Komi is a very kind and caring person, and tries to help others whenever possible.^{eg. Ch. 31, 64, 99} Despite her anxiety, Komi is a very good student, usually being at the top of her class in tests.^{Ch. 36,}^{Vol. 12} She is also good at sports, allowing her to be a serious competitor to the very sportive Chika Netsuno. Though she only barely learns how to ride a bike when Tadano teaches her.^{Ch. 187} Komi likes to read and is a good cook.^{eg. Ch. 49, 66, 207} She is very fond of cats and owns several plush cats and cat dolls. After learning about a cat café in her town, she quickly becomes a regular and befriends the normally very distanced black cat Chocolat.^{Ch. 81, 214}
Aside of Tadano, her closest friends are Manbagi, Katō, Sasaki, Ase, and Isagi.
Her name Komi, when written in the Japanese order, refers to the Japanese term komyushō (コミュ症; communication disorder).

Hitohito Tadano (只野 仁人, Tadano Hitohito)
Voiced by: Gakuto Kajiwara (Japanese); Kyle McCarley (English)
Portrayed by: Takahisa Masuda
Tadano is a student at the prestigious Itan High School and Komi's seatmate. He has short black hair with a white flower-shaped cowlick. A recurring joke is that Tadano is otherwise completely average: he is of average size (for a Japanese teenager)^{Ch. ?}, has an average appearance, has average grades,^{Ch. 36,}^{Vol. 12} shows average performance at sports,^{Ch. ?} etc. So much so, that various characters will often exclaim the degree of how completely average and neutral he is. When first enrolling at Itan High, He intended to be completely normal and not stand out,^{Ch. 1} but his plans are foiled when he meets Komi on his first day at school and discovers her communication disorder. As such, he befriends her and promises to help accomplish her dream of having 100 friends, with him being the first.
In middle school, Tadano was a chūnibyō: he slicked back his hair, popped up his collar, and tried to act cool. After embarrassing himself by a failed attempt to confess his love to his classmate Kawai, he dropped the persona and decided to become completely normal.^{Ch. 32} In later chapters, Tadano confesses that his real motives for wanting to be normal were for wanting to fit in with everyone else, and avoid being looked down on if he were to challenge himself, fail, or try to be special.
Upon enrolling at Itan High, initially, Tadano was quickly ostracized and belittled by most of his first-year classmates, mainly due to the excessive adoration students had for Komi, their jealousy of his increasing closeness with her, and their perception of him being plain and uninteresting as a person. Over time however, he garnered more acceptance and friendship, due to his own friendly nature, and the kindness and understanding he would show others. Some students recognizing his qualities right from the start.
During his second year, he quickly became acquainted with the new students, and was fully respected and liked as a fellow classmate. And that same fondness would continue over into his third year. As well as previous classmates who had given him a hard time, started to hold him in higher respect and regard. During the course of the story, students started to acknowledge Tadano's and Komi's bond and became supportive of their relationship. By the time he starts dating Komi, even the same Komi fanatics come to begrudgingly accept Tadano as her boyfriend, but still feel jealousy towards him.
Tadano's friendly demeanor initially leads to him being taken advantage of. He was pushed into being the class representative when no one else wanted to ^{Ch. 17}, or used by his teachers to take over their menial tasks ^{Ch. 58} . On several occasions, he find himself forced to cross-dress^{Ch. 68, 224, 251}. Tadano's closest friends besides Komi and Najimi are Katai, Naruse, and Kometani.
Along with his kindness, Tadano has an almost uncanny ability of perceptiveness, being able to accurately guess the true thoughts and feelings behind a person. This perceptiveness is what helped Tadano figure out Komi's true personality and insecurities and establish a friendship with her. Due to this ability he can act as a translator of a kind for Komi and other characters with similar communication disorders, like Katai, Katai's father, or Ogiya, and helps them to express their true feelings and intentions. Despite Tadano's perceptiveness he can still be normally dense at times, for example not recognizing Komi's and Manbagi's attempts to flirt with him.
Tadano very quickly develops romantic feelings for Komi, but rejects the idea of her being interested in him for the longest time. Due to feeling inadequate as a person and potential partner. As a result, he does not act on his feelings and prefers to set them out of mind, until Manbagi – who also fell in love with him – makes him acknowledge his hidden love for her.^{Ch. 300–304} After he confesses to her, the two become a couple and start dating. Over the course of their relationship, Tadano becomes more truthful and open to his desires for Komi. Desiring to move on from his decision of wanting to be normal, in order to be truly worthy for her.
Tadano lives with his parents and younger sister Hitomi in a fairly small flat in an apartment block where he and Hitomi share a room together. He is very enthusiastic about old buildings^{Ch. 103, 105, 293} and want to become a teacher after school.^{Ch. 349}
Tadano's name is a play on words: tada no hito (ただの人) means "an ordinary/average person", and "hito" (仁) means "human" or "compassionate".

== First year classmates ==
Najimi Osana (長名 なじみ, Osana Najimi)
Voiced by: Rie Murakawa (Japanese); Skyler Davenport (English)
Portrayed by: Yūtarō
Najimi is an old friend of Tadano who happens to be genderfluid. In Middle School, they dressed in a boy's uniform but in High School, they primarily dress as a girl (wearing a skirt but a shirt with a necktie instead of a ribbon).^{Ch. 9} Najimi's unspecified gender leads to comedic situations throughout the series, such as their choice of a dressing room^{Ch. 39} and how to grade their performance in sports.^{Ch. 137}
Najimi is socially extremely skilled and everybody's friend. Through their social ability they are able to become friends with anyone in a few minutes. ^{Ch. 9} Despite their social skills, Najimi initially did not want to become Komi's friend: they had already met Komi in elementary school and attempted to befriend her, but got scared off by Komi's silence and staring. Only after Komi "saved" them from some unwanted suitor, Najimi warms up to Komi.
Especially early on, Najimi is a crucial catalyst for Komi getting more acquainted to social situations by organizing get-togethers^{Ch. 22, 46, 79, 179} and trips during summer vacation,^{Ch. 37} involving her in games,^{Ch. 19} or making Komi order food for them in cafés and sandwich shops.^{Ch. 13, 51} Najimi also instigates situations in which Komi and Tadano get to know each other better, thus furthering their romantic relationship.^{eg. Ch. 22, 46, 180, 246}
Najimi is abject to studying, but gets good grades.^{Ch. 36, 159} They often organize pranks^{eg. Ch. 180} or cause mischief in other ways.^{Ch. 141} Najimi has a tendency to have a gambling addiction,^{Ch. 46–47} and keeps coming up with shady business schemes for the school's cultural festivals.^{Ch. 69, 234}
Najimi's full name osananajimi (幼馴染) literally means "childhood friend".
Himiko Agari (上理 卑美子, Agari Himiko)
Voiced by: Yukiyo Fujii (Japanese); Sarah Williams (English)
Agari is a fearful girl in Komi's class, who gets nervous when having to speak to others. Najimi picked her as potential friend for Komi due to their similar traits.^{Ch. 14} Agari is initially scared of Komi when she begins following her (as Komi herself was too anxious to speak to Agari), but then gets the idea that Komi is trying to encourage her. Feeling not worthy of Komi's friendship, she agrees to become her dog, revealing her masochist traits. Though, she later comes to acknowledge herself as her genuine friend.
Agari is a foodie and shows her confident and knowledgeable side when it comes to food. ^{Ch. 28, 61, 139,} She also posts restaurant reviews on an internet site. Her aunt owns a food stand.^{Ch. 193} Agari has a voluptuous figure and is somewhat self-conscious of her large breasts.^{Ch. 106}
Her name is a pun on agari shō (あがり症) (stage fright) and hikyō (卑怯) (cowardice), referencing her anxiety of speaking in front of others.
Ren Yamai (山井 恋, Yamai Ren)
Voiced by: Rina Hidaka (Japanese); Cristina Vee (English)
Yamai is obsessed with Komi, claiming to be in love with her. Because of that, she is extremely jealous of Tadano's closeness to Komi. Initially, she tries to deter Tadano from coming close to Komi^{Ch. 8} and later even kidnaps and threatens him.^{Ch. 23–26} Only after Yamai profusely apologizes for her actions, Komi agrees to become friends with her.
She fetishizes objects related to Komi (e.g. a hair from Komi,^{Ch. 23} an old pantyhose,^{Ch. 120} or a cup Komi drank from^{Ch. 312}). She also regularly comes up with schemes to get Komi in slightly sexual situations.^{eg. Ch. 47, 60, 106, 117, 336} which consistently fail. Komi's self appointed bodyguards, Kishi in particular, keep foiling Yamai's attempts to harass Komi^{eg. Ch. 342}. Throughout the story, she has always remained jealous of Tadano's relationship with Komi. When she and all the students eventually find out that they have begun dating, she tries to attack Tadano in jealous anger, only for Komi to jump in to protect him. When Tadano's and Komi's dedication to each other becomes apparent to everyone, she is driven off in despair. Though afterwards, when Komi visits her at home to reiterate her affection for Tadano, Yamai admits that she is aware that Tadano is a better person than she initially perceived him as. And while she'll never accept their relationship, there is a part of her that totally understands it. At a later point, Yamai also discloses the reasons of her obsessiveness with Komi, revealing that she was fixated solely on her beauty, and still presently. That she didn't care what kind of personality or other traits Komi had, slowly learning about them only after Komi accepted her as a friend. Iterating that she has still grown an appreciation for Komi despite her obsessive harassment for her.
Yamai is from the beginning friends with Himeko Kishi and Akako Onigashima. She is musically gifted and plays violin and piano.^{eg. Ch. 235} Her family is wealthy and tends to spend their vacation overseas.^{eg. Ch. 94, 186}
Her relationship to Nakanaka could be described as frenemies. While the two constantly quarrel and compete for Komi's affection, Yamai coaches Nakanaka's band before their performance at the culture festival and plays with them on stage.^{eg. Ch. 235} The two also fight side-by-side in a school-wide battle royale (with toy guns) in their third year.^{eg. Ch. 333} Lily Sukida ships them as Yama x Naka.^{eg. Ch. 137}
Her family name is homophone to the Japanese word yamai (病) meaning "illness" or "sickness", while "Ren" is a different reading of the kanji 愛, meaning "love". Her name is also a reference to her yandere nature.
Omoharu Nakanaka (中々 思春, Nakanaka Omoharu)
Voiced by: Rumi Okubo (Japanese); Cherami Leigh (English)
Nakanaka is a chūnibyō who imagines being a reincarnation of a warrior called "Arsot Les Primavera" from a fantasy world, who is carrier of a secret "dragon force". Before meeting Komi, Nakanaka was lonely^{Ch. 31} and hadn't had any friends since elementary school.^{Ch. 48} She used her imagination to cope with her feelings of isolation. She tries to become friends with Komi by pretending to know her from an earlier life as "Princess Komila". After Komi notices that Nakanaka feels alone during physical education, she reaches out to Nakanaka and becomes her friend.^{Ch. 31} Nakanaka is socially awkward and does not really know how to interact with other people.^{Ch. 48} In her second year at Itan High School, she manages to befriend Mako Ojousa, Tonatsu Hanya, and Towa Bosa, somewhat with the unintended help of Ren Yamai.^{Ch. 156}
In school, Nakanaka tends to wear her jacket over her shoulders as a cape, has (fake) bandages on her left arm, and a fingerless glove on her right hand. Most of the time, she wears an eye bandage, which she claims to contain her "dragon force". On some occasions, she wears a colored contact lens underneath the eyepatch.^{eg. Ch. 98} Outside of school, she dresses in a mild goth style.^{eg. Ch. 47, 48}
Nakanaka is an avid gamer, although not extremely skilled.^{Ch. 174} She often plays a mobile MMO called "PGO" (a riff on Fate/Grand Order, "FGO" for short).^{eg. Ch. 94} She is also shown to collect manga, anime poster, and corresponding figurines. In her second year at Itan High School, she forms a rock band called "Perro Rabioso" ("Mad Dog" in Spanish) together with Mako, Tonatsu, and Towa with Yamai's support.^{Ch. 235} Nakanaka is the singer and writes the lyrics.
Her relationship with Yamai is characterized by dispute, with both of them vying for Komi's affection. Despite this, there is also an underlying friendship between them as they also support each other, e.g. when Yamai coaches Nakanaka's band or when Nakanaka and her bandmates provide Yamai moral support after Komi got together with Tadano as a couple.^{Ch. 312}
Nakanaka's name is written with the kanji naka (中) which can alternatively read as "chū", referencing her nature as chūnibyō. Her given name consist of the kanji 思 and 春, meaning "thought, imagination" and "spring, adolescence" respectively, alluding to chūnibyō being the state of an adolescent having delusions of grandeur.
Makeru Yadano (矢田野 まける, Yadano Makeru)
Voiced by: Ami Maeshima (Japanese); Kira Buckland (English)
Makeru is Komi's self-proclaimed rival, and a member of the school's track team. She is known for always hating to lose in competitions and displaying extreme facial expressions when trying to compete. She constantly tries to compete with Komi in all kinds of activities, from physical traits and performance in sports,^{Ch. 20–21} to grades^{Ch. 36}, cooking skills^{Ch. 119} and all kinds of games^{eg. Ch. 115}, despite Komi never being aware of a competition between them. Makeru loses every time, but always declares the results to be a tie. Her losing streak is shown to not being limited to competitions with Komi.^{Ch. 186} It is later revealed, that while Makeru's frustration of losing seems to be comedic, she actually hides sincere feelings of frustration of always being second best and never anything more. Her extreme faces are really just an attempt at humor to maintain her dignity and avoid pity. Even so, she remains undeterred and vows to keep on competing.
Her name is a play of words on the phrase Makeru yada no (負けるやだの), meaning "I hate losing."
Himeko Kishi (岸 姫子, Kishi Himeko)
Voiced by: Maaya Uchida^{Ep. 20 credits}
Kishi usually wears partial knight's armor on her left arm and legs. She is initially part of Yamai's circle of friends, but becomes quickly one of Komi's most loyal followers. She is part of Komi's self-proclaimed honour guard and regularly acts as foil to Yamai's attempts to come too close to Komi.^{eg. Ch. 342}
Despite her appearing first in chapter 8 of the manga, her face isn't shown until chapter 270. Before that, her face is always covered up by other characters or speech bubbles, or simply not drawn. She is not depicted to really interact with Komi before Chapter 331.
Kishi is trained in martial arts, fencing, and horseback riding and is part of the school's volleyball team.^{Ch. 342} She protects Komi out of a desire to serve and loses her purpose after Komi tells her she does not want Kishi to be her servant.^{Ch. 343} Kishi shortly becomes a delinquent, but finds her way again after Komi explains she would prefer her protection as a friend.
Her name, 岸 (Kishi) is homophone to the Japanese word kishi (騎士), meaning "knight". Together with her given name Himeko, which means "princess", her name describes her as "Princess Knight".
Akako Onigashima (鬼ヶ島 朱子, Onigashima Akako)
Voiced by: Sarah Emi Bridcutt (Japanese); Erika Harlacher (English)
Like Kishi is Onigashima part of Yamai's circle of friends. She is usually carefree and friendly but gets quickly irritated by minor drawbacks, causing her to rage like a demon.^{Ch. 121} Her name means "Red Girl from Oni Island" which is a reference to the tale of Momotaro.
Shigeo Chiarai (地洗井 茂夫, Chiarai Shigeo)
Voiced by: Kenji Akabane (Japanese); Sean Chiplock (English)
Chiarai is friends with Sonoda and Shinobino. He has ruffled hair with a short braid and hairpins. Along with this friends, he starts the tradition of the boys in class fantasizing about dating the girls.^{Ch. 75}. Which later on grows in members such as Tōtoi, Fukusuki, and Ohai. Tadano also happens to get mixed into the group by the time they start using hoods to conceal their identities. At some point, it is iterated that the members had become aware of who each other are. Meaning that Chiarai, Sonoda, and Shinobino had at some point realized Tadano's presence amongst their fantasizing tradition, despite their initial hostility of him in the beginning of the story. Which may be part of the reason why the three had grown to have more respect and fondness for Tadano as the story progressed. By their third school year, when Tadano was preparing to take a college entrance exam to attend Komi's university choice, Chiarai and the other two are shown wishing Tadano good luck in friendship and camaraderie. Chiarai is also a fan of Yadano, and is a member of the small "Yadano-san Fan Club". His name is a reference to charao, which is the male counterpart of a gyaru.
Taisei Sonoda (園田 大勢, Sonoda Taisei)
Voiced by: Yuga Satō (Japanese); Devin Hennessy (English)
Sonoda has long, black, slicked back hair. Along with his friends Chiarai and Shinobino, he regularly fantasizes about dating the girls in his class. He has been shown to have a crush on Nakanaka in particular.^{Ch. 75, 117} His name is a pun on the phrase sono da (そのだ), meaning "that's it", while is given name 大勢 (taisei) means "the general trend/situation".
Mono Shinobino (忍野 裳乃, Shinobino Mono)
Voiced by: Kensho Ono (Japanese); Jack Dillon (English)
Shinobino dresses and acts like a ninja, including constantly wearing a face mask and a black bandana with a metal plate. He is part of Komi's self-appointed bodyguards. Along with his friends Chiarai and Sonoda, he regularly fantasizes about dating the girls in his class. His name is a reference to his ninja attitude, being homophone to the Japanese term shinobi no mono (忍びの者), meaning "a person in hiding".
Nokoko Inaka (井中 のこ子, Inaka Nokoko)
Voiced by: Megumi Han (Japanese); Suzie Yeung (English)
Inaka is a girl from the countryside who strives to be a city girl, who speaks with a noticeable dialect.^{Ch. 51} She is scared of others shunning her for being a country girl, although in reality most of her classmates already know. Inaka sees Komi as example of how to be a perfect city girl and tries to imitate her.
Inaka lives in the same town as Komi's grandmother^{Ch. 93}, where she helps out as miko at a shrine during winter break. She is Komorebi Hiki's elder cousin.^{Ch. 275} Her name inaka no ko (田舎のこ) means literally "country girl".
Nene Onemine (尾根峰 ねね, Onemine Nene)
Voiced by: Ruriko Aoki (Japanese); Casey Mongillo (English)
Onemine is a kind and reliable girl who has a sisterly personality.^{Ch. 58} Apart from Najimi, she is one of the first to notice the budding love between Komi and Tadano. Onemine's closest friend is Otori, with whom she usually keeps holding hands to keep Otori from vanishing.^{Ch. 292} She lives with three younger unruly siblings in a small house.^{Ch. 116} She also has a fourth sibling (older than the first three) but very little is shown about him. Her name refers to the Japanese word for "big sister" onee (お姉).
Kaede Otori (尾鶏 かえで, Otori Kaede)
Voiced by: Yurika Moriyama (Japanese); Cherami Leigh (English)
Otori is a girl with a ditzy and sluggish personality.^{Ch. 64} Everything she does, she does very slowly. Despite that, Otori has a tendency to vanish unexpectedly and finding herself in odd places,^{Ch. 71, 241} a trait she shares with her mother.^{Ch. 186} She is good friends with Onemine and usually together with her. Otori lives in a huge, European style mansion.^{Ch. 241} Her name is a pun on the Japanese word ottori (おっとり), meaning "calm" or "gentle".
Makoto Katai (片居 誠, Katai Makoto)
Voiced by: Shin'ichirō Kamio (Japanese); Jacob Hopkins (English)
Portrayed by: Junpei Mizobata
Katai is a tall and muscular student with an intimidating appearance, who everyone sees as a delinquent. However, he is actually a kind and timid person, who like Komi suffers from a communication disorder.^{Ch. 76} He only joins the class several months into the semester, after first having been sick on the first day of school, and then too shy to enter the campus afterwards. To raise confidence, he worked out, built muscle, and dyed his hair. Katai usually talks in a low and gravelly voice which is hard to make out, adding to the misunderstanding of him being a delinquent.
Tadano was initially the only one who approached Katai without fear and being friendly, which causes Katai to become almost immediately enamored with Tadano. Their friendship appears to be of an almost romantic nature,^{eg. Ch. 80, 95, 117} often to Komi's confusion. Katai is scared of Komi (who in turn is scared of Katai), but sees her as "communication master" who is trying to teach him how to communicate properly. Katai's family owns a martial arts dojo^{Ch. 179} and all have the same intimidating appearance.^{also Ch. 186} But like Katai, much of his family have the same kind personality that he does. His younger sister Ai however, is the only one with an aggressive personality and constantly lashes out at him.
His name is homophone to katai (固い), meaning "hard" or "firm".
Shisuto Naruse (成瀬 詩守斗, Naruse Shisuto)
Voiced by: Katsuyuki Miura (Japanese); Ryan Colt Levy (English)
Portrayed by: Yu Shirota
Naruse is a student who has delusions of grandeur due to being a bishōnen.^{Ch. 102} He believes all that his classmates admire and adore him, although they are mostly indifferent about him. Mainly due to people being put off by his eccentric and over the top mannerisms. Naruse initially believes that only Komi is worthy of him, because of her beauty. But has since found friendship in other classmates as well. Though, he was already friends with Kometani during his introduction. Despite being narcissistic, he is fundamentally kind and friendly, for example offering his lunch to Tadano or encouraging Ase to not feel inferior and to love herself. He is also shown to be observant of other people in contrast to his focus on himself. Being another character besides Tadano to recognize Komi's problem with communication, or being aware of Ase's self-consciousness about her sweat.
Over the course of the manga, Naruse and Ase become closer and ultimately start dating.^{Ch. 165, 180, 289–290, 347, 361} In their relationship, he is shown to be thoughtful of her wishes and takes initiative to help/protect her. Naruse's grandfather is shown to be at least as narcissistic as himself.^{Ch. 186}
Naruse's name is a play on words with the Japanese term for "narcissist", ナルシシスト (narushishisuto).
Chūshaku Kometani (米谷 忠釈, Kometani Chūshaku)
Voiced by: Shotaro Uzawa (Japanese); Howard Wang (English)
Kometani is a poker-faced student who frequently comments on the story, breaking the fourth wall, and always talks in captions instead of speech bubbles. He was already friends with Naruse when the two are introduced to the story.^{Ch. 102} While initially only commenting on events where he is present, he later does so even when he is not actually part of the story in that moment, usually appearing in the corner of the panel. ^{eg. Ch. 239}
His face is normally drawn stylized, except for a few exceptions.^{eg. Ch. 201, 288, 360} He apparently also lives in a family of sisters. Kometani's name is a pun on the English word "commentate".
Ayami Sasaki (佐々木 あやみ, Sasaki Ayami)
Voiced by: Minami Takahashi (Japanese); Stephanie Sheh (English)
Sasaki is a member of Komi's group for the Year 1 field trip,^{Ch. 104} where she and Katō plan to make the trip as enjoyable for Komi as possible. She is a highly gifted yo-yo master as she landed 3rd place in the world championship.^{Ch. 111} Sasaki initially tries to keep this secret, as she has been ridiculed about this in the past. So she disguises with a hannya mask and takes up the stagename "Y. Y. Hannya". Komi and Kato are both aware of her "secret" identity. On occasions, Sasaki uses her yo-yo skills to earn money.^{Ch. 292}
Sasaki is one of Komi's closest friends. She, Komi, and Kato often meet at Kato's house to drink tea and discuss love matters.^{eg. Ch. 149, 195, 245} Sasaki mischievously plays matchmaker on several occasions, arranging situations where one of her friends has to interact with their respective crushes.^{eg. Ch. 113, 117}
In contrast to most other names, Sasaki's name is not a pun or play on words: Ayami Sasaki is an anagram of "Asamiya Saki", the name of a character from the manga series Sukeban Deka who uses a yo-yo to fight crime.
Mikuni Katō (加藤 三九二, Katō Mikuni)
Voiced by: Fumiko Uchimura (Japanese); Dorothy Fahn (English)
Katō is a member of Komi's group for the Year 1 field trip,^{Ch. 104} who aspires to be a competitive shogi player.^{Ch. 111} She is highly organized and plans out Komi's, Sasaki's, and her field trip to Kyoto to the minute. Along with Sasaki, she is aware of Komi's crush on Tadano and highly supportive of both of them getting together. Katō herself has a crush on Katai. Which has been addressed on different occasions, but nothing had ever developed from this fact.
Katō lives with her family in a huge mansion in a traditional Japanese style,^{Ch. 149} where she, Sasaki, and Komi regularly meet to discuss love matters. While there, they get dressed up in kimono by her mother Yakuna Katō.
Katō's name is unusual among the names of the characters in the series, as it is no pun or wordplay. Instead, it is a reference to the well-known shogi player Hifumi Katō. Both their given names are made up of numbers: mikuni (三九二) means "three, nine, two", while hifumi (一二三) means "one, two, three".
Amami Satō (左藤 甘美, Satō Amami)
Voiced by: Live Mukai^{Ep. 23 credits} (Japanese); Sarah Anne Williams (English)
Satō is a sweet girl who always agrees to do favors for anyone who would ask her.^{Ch. 122} She is a member of the Sociology Club together with Ushiroda and Maeda. The Japanese word 砂糖 (satou) means "sugar" and 甘み (amami) means "sweetness". The Japanese word for "sweet" amai (甘い) can also mean "naive".
Eiko Ushiroda (牛路田 影子, Ushiroda Eiko)
Voiced by: Mari Uchiyama^{Ep. 23 credits}
Ushiroda is a member of the Sociology Club together with Satō and Maeda. She is worried about Satō's over-benevolence.^{Ch. 122} Her name is a pun on the Japanese expression 後ろだ (ushiro da), meaning "being behind", because she sits behind Komi in class.
Hoshio Maeda (前田 星雄, Maeda Hoshio)
Voiced by: Naoki Kuwata^{Ep. 23 credits} (Japanese); Sean Chiplock (English)
Maeda is a member of the Sociology Club together with Satō and Ushiroda.^{Ch. 122} He expresses his interest in older women on several occasions,^{Ch. 122, ?} earning him the nickname Jukujosukii (熟女好き), "loves older women". His name "Maeda" refers to him sitting in front of Komi, as mae da (前だ) means "being in front".
Toshio Seikimatsu (世紀末 年男, Seikimatsu Toshio)
Voiced by: Norihito Hase (Japanese); Sean Chiplock (English)
Seikimatsu is a tall and muscular character with a very distinct mohawk and fringe of hair, but has a passive and gentle personality. He returns as a classmate in Komi and Tadano's third year class, where he develops a friendship with Tadano. He had elbowed Tadano in the face in their first year (when he and other classmates rushed to meet Komi), for which he had always wanted to apologize for, but only manages to do so in their third year. He has also had a charming girlfriend throughout his three years in high school, surprising many due to his intimidating physique. He's also revealed to have an older sister, Hao, who works an instructor at a local driving school. Who shares his fashion style of spikes and black leather but has a more normal physique. His name means literally "end of the century man" and is a reference to the Fist of the Northstar characters Kenshiro and Raoh, who both bear similar titles.
Samu Samurai (佐村井 サム, Samurai Samu)
Voiced by: Tooru Arizumi (Japanese); Jack Dillon (English)
A boy in the class who dresses and styles his hair like a samurai.
Yuuji Otaku (小宅 優司, Otaku Yūji)
Voiced by: Tooru Arizumi (Japanese); Todd Haberkorn (English)
Otaku has a striking face and wears horn-rimmed glasses. Despite being introduced as not looking like an otaku,^{Ch. 62} he still shows typical otaku interests, like manga, movies, and novels.^{Ch. 216}
Class Delinquents
A group of four unnamed delinquents. One always wears a baseball cap and a hoodie, one has curtain bangs, the third one has his hair combed straight up, and the fourth constantly wears a medical face mask.^{Ch. 17} The four are part of Komi's self-appointed bodyguard. They are initially scared of Katai, but soon come to admire him due to his physique.^{Ch. 110}

== Second year classmates ==
Rumiko Manbagi (万場木 留美子, Manbagi Rumiko)
Portrayed by: Ai Yoshikawa
Manbagi is a gyaru who joins Tadano and Komi's class in their second year of high school.^{Ch. 131} She initially presents herself with an excessive amount of ganguro make-up, scaring people off. She befriends Tadano and Komi when they help her after an anxiety attack. Manbagi puts off the make-up after Komi and Tadano tell her she would look better without.^{Ch. 136}
Manbagi quickly becomes Komi's best friend and confidant. Her reactions to Tadano are initially abrasive, as she did not know how to react to his kindness and compliments.^{Ch. 136} But she quickly develops romantic feelings for him, such as when Tadano protected her from the advances by the Golden Skulls.^{Ch. 165} She finally acknowledges these feelings during their alone time at the fireworks festival. Manbagi is initially unaware that Komi is also in love with Tadano, until realizing it when watching Komi and Tadano play a romantic scene in the class' stageplay at the culture festival.^{Ch. 223} When Manbagi decides to give up on Tadano for Komi's sake, Komi refuses as she does not want to be responsible for Manbagi's unhappiness while also being insecure about Tadano's feelings for her.^{Ch. 228} Despite both being in love with Tadano and vying for his affection, Manbagi and Komi are both determined to remain friends.
After some unsuccessful attempts,^{Ch. 264, 294} Manbagi finally manages to confess her love to Tadano and asks him to date, which he initially accepts.^{Ch. 300} But noticing his inner uncertainty, she asks him whether he is really sure about his feelings, which makes him realize his own suppressed love for Komi. With her blessing, Manbagi urges him to confess to her.^{Ch. 302} Manbagi is left heartbroken, but finds support from her classmates and friends ^{Ch. 303}. Afterwards, reassuring both Komi and Tadano that she still values them both, and wishes them best wishes on their relationship.
In her third year, she starts to build a friendship with her new seatmate Taketoshi Wakai,^{Ch. 345} which he is initially unable to reciprocate due to him suffering from gynophobia. Over time, Wakai starts to feel more secure with her and opens up more. Later on, Wakai makes an accidental love confession to Manbagi, then later in earnest when pressured by her. Manbagi feels happy about this, but asks him for time to think. Meeting with Tadano sometime after on a date, she reveals Wakai's confession to her, and confesses to Tadano that she still hasn't come to terms with her feelings for him. But after spending the day with him, comes to accept her affections as a friend and let him go. Later on, when coming to watch one of Wakai's soccer matches, she is surprised and blushed when he confesses to her again, and seemingly accepts his confession. She later reveals to Komi and others that her original intention was to reject Wakai, only because she is unsure if she really likes him, but it is obvious that she does in how she thinks about him. Nevertheless, she agrees to be his girlfriend, and shown to be content and devoted in their relationship.
Before meeting Komi, Manbagi was already friends with Yuka, Mutan, and Gonzales, three other gyarus.^{Ch. 140} She owns a goldfish called People-kun (ぴーぷるくん, Piipurukun), named after Hitohito Tadano. (hito (人) means people).^{Ch. 217}
Manbagi's name is a direct reference to her initial styling as Manba Gyaru.
Shibuki Ase (阿瀬 志吹, Ase Shibuki)
Portrayed by: Miwako Kakei
Ase is a girl who sweats profusely. She is highly self-conscious about this and feels everyone is disgusted of her.^{Ch. 151} She befriends Komi and Manbagi when they lend her an antiperspirant. Ase is Isagi's closest friend, having known her since elementary school.^{Ch. 196} When getting to know Naruse, she becomes inspired by his words to her and his pride in himself, which encourages her to have confidence too. Over the course of the manga, she and Naruse become closer and eventually start dating.^{Ch. 165, 180, 289–290, 347, 361}. She is also one of the only characters who was (and still is) never bothered by Naruse's eccentric behavior. Seeing more of his good sides, which she finds kind and cute.
Her name 汗飛沫 (ase shibuki) means "drops of sweat".
Kiyoko Isagi (潔 清子, Isagi Kiyoko)
Isagi is a germaphobe, who wants to become the student council president.^{Ch. 196} She cannot stand to be touched by other people, thoroughly washing herself if she cannot avoid it, and disinfects her desk and items constantly. She is still willing to bear with physical contact when making an effort to help other people.^{Ch. 196, 303} Isagi herself has very high moral standards, and is initially adverse to accept other people's help.
Her ambition stems from an incident at the entrance ceremony, when incumbent student council president Ichō's actions inspired her. Despite finding out that Ichō and her actions were not what she believed, Isagi is not discouraged.^{Ch. 200} She ultimately manages to win the election due to speeches by Ase and herself, which are brutally honest about her flaws.^{Ch. 202–203}
Isagi knows Ase since elementary school.^{Ch. 196} She feels responsible for Ase's low self-esteem because she called her filthy shortly after Isagi developed her germaphobia.^{Ch. 202} Ase forgave her though and remained friendly with her, but Isagi nevertheless acted distant to Ase out of guilt for several years. After reconciling with Ase properly after her election, she becomes very protective of her, and who she views as her best friend.
During the second year's culture festival, Isagi forms the "Federation for Breaking Illicit Relationships" (Japanese: Fujun iseikouyuu bokumetsu iinkai (不純異性交遊撲滅委員会)) – or "FBI" for short – with the student council to prevent "immoral" behaviour between students of opposite gender.^{Ch. 229} They do so by hitting the perpetrators with toy hammers. Isagi does not approve of the relationship between Ase and Naruse because she considers him an idiot who might unintentionally hurt her.^{Ch. 229, 262, 289, 291, 362–363}
The kanji in her name (isagi (潔), kiyoshi (清)) both mean "clean" or "pure".
Shuki Ohai (緒杯 朱紀, Ohai Shuki)
Ohai likes breasts.^{Ch. 130} During the second and third year fitness tests, she comments on the chest size of the other girls.^{Ch. 137, 346} She also acts as judge during the Summer Uniform Grand Prix^{Ch. 150, 366} and the Smile contest.^{Ch. 201} Along with Toutoi and Fukusuki, she forms the "Riverside Magazine Hunters Club" (Kasenjiki hon sagashibu (河川敷本探し部)), looking for thrown-away erotic magazines on the river bank.^{Ch. 192}
Her name is a pun on oppai suki (おっぱい 好き), "likes breasts".
Son Tōtoi (尊井 尊, Tōtoi Son)
Tōtoi looks like Buddha, but has a very lecherous character.^{Ch. 130} Together with Ohai and Fukusuki he forms the "Riverside Magazine Hunters Club". Tōtoi regularly organises contents where the unsuspecting participants are judged by their looks, like the annual Summer Uniform Grand Prix^{Ch. 150, 366} and the Smile Contest.^{Ch. 201} For a test of courage, in which Najimi pranks Komi and Tadano, he gets painted gold to appear as a Buddha statue.
His name tōtoi (尊い) means "noble" or "sacred", which in this case is ironic as Tōtoi is neither.
Natsu Fukusuki (福数寄 夏, Fukusuki Natsu)
Fukusuki likes summer uniforms.^{Ch. 192} He often acts as a judge for certain occasions, such as the Summer Uniform Grand Prix^{Ch. 150, 366} or the Smile contest.^{Ch. 201} Despite his prim demeanor, he still has perverted tastes. Together with Toutoi and Ohai, he is part of the "Riverside Magazine Hunters Club". He becomes the costume designer for class 2-1's stageplay during the school's culture festival.^{Ch. 238}
His name is a play on words of the phrase natsufuku suki (夏服 好き), literally "likes summer uniforms".
Saku Fushima (腐島 さく, Fushima Saku)
Fushima is a hobby mangaka.^{Ch. 188} She is into yaoi and ships Tadano and Katai as "Kata x Tada".^{Ch. 188, 193} She was forced by Najimi to introduce herself to the class by rapping.^{Ch. 130}
Her name means "rotten/debauched works", referring to her lewd fantasies.
Maya Takarazuka (宝塚 真矢, Takarazuka Maya)
Takarazuka is an androgynous, handsome girl who is a talented actor.^{Ch. 221} She only plays male roles, feeling that female roles are beyond her believability.^{Ch. 227}. She still shows feminine traits and insists for others to remember that she is still a girl. Takarazuka is aware of the unspoken love between Komi and Tadano, so she arranges situations where they both have an opportunity to get closer. Her name is a reference to the all-female Takarazuka Revue musical troupe.
Shiki Gekidan (劇段 色, Gekidan Shiki)
Gekidan is a girl who always wears a lion costume headpiece. She is theatrical and into acting. During the class' attempt to get Komi's contact info, she performs a musical number in her try.^{Ch. 258} Her name is direct reference to the Japanese musical theatre company of the same name Gekidan Shiki (劇団四季).
Men Kichō (帰蝶 綿, Kichō Men)
Kichō is a character who is very thorough and always wants precision and accuracy.^{Ch. 188, 238} He can be bothered if something is even a millimeter out of place. He tries to get Komi's contact details by writing his own on a rice corn, which unfortunately gets blown away.^{Ch. 258} His name is a pun on kichōmen (几帳面), meaning "meticulous".
Spiri Urana (占南 スピリ, Urana Supiri)
Uruna is a girl who dresses like a fortune teller and has a tear shaped mole under her eye.^{Ch. 188} Fitting her outfit, she constantly tries to sell trinkets and talismans to students and visitors of the culture festival.^{Ch. 238, 258} Her name is a word play on 占い (urai), "fortune telling" and supirito (スピリト), "spirit".
Masuko Fuwa (不破 益子, Fuwa Masuko)
Fuwa is a small rotund girl with a soft belly and constant smile on her face, who is something like the class mascot. Her name is a pun on fuwa masuko (ふわマスコ), "fluffy mascot".
Kaname Bodou (母堂 かなめ, Bodō Kaname)
Bodou is a boy who has a very motherly nature and cares for his classmates like a mother, for instance by bringing them water^{Ch. 240} or fruit.^{Ch. 258} As result, his classmates refer to him as a "mom", which he hates being called. His name is a play on words with the Japanese word for "mother" okaasan (お母さん).
Ichinose (一ノ瀬), Ninomai (二舞), Santori (三取), Shishima (四志摩)
Ichinose, Ninomai, Santori, and Shishima are seatmates and tend to do everything together.^{Ch. 188, 258} Their names are puns on the Japanese words for "one" 一 (ichi), "two" 二 (ni), "three" 三 (san), and "four" 四 (shi), earning them the nickname "The Number Guys" sūji no hito (数字の人).
Ken Inui (乾 賢, Inui Ken)
Inui is a boy whose hair makes him look as if he has dog ears. He is constantly quarreling with his childhood friend Sarutahiko.^{Ch. 188, 212, 258} It is implied they get along better ever since Valentine's Day, being awoken to deeper feelings. His name is a pun on the Japanese word for "dog" inu (犬).
Mei Sarutahiko (猿田彦 めい, Sarutahiko Mei)
Sarutahiko is a girl who resembles a monkey due to her hair. She is always getting into arguments with her childhood friend Inui.^{Ch. 188, 212, 258} It is implied they get along better ever since Valentine's Day, being awoken to deeper feelings.Her name references the Shinto god Sarutahiko Ōkami, whose name sarutahiko ōkami (猿田彦大神) can be translated as "Prince of the Monkey Fields".
Kingyo Baba (馬場 金魚, Baba Kingyo)
Baba is a girl whose head resembles a goldfish. She always follows the flow of what everyone else is doing or saying, constantly repeating her catchphrase "That's right!" (sō de yansu ne (そうでヤンスね)).^{eg. Ch. 188} She remarked once that it is impossible for her to do things of her own volition. Her name kingyo (金魚) literally means "goldfish".
Reika Tsunde (積手 れいか, Tsunde Reika)
Tsunde is a tsundere.^{eg. Ch. 210} It was revealed on White Day that she fell in love with Bodou.
Mitsu Toro (吐露 蜜, Toro Mitsu)
Toro is a seductive, but lazy girl who uses her appeal to charm the boys into doing her all kinds of favors, including carrying her up the stairs.^{Ch. 240} Komi and Manbagi ask her to teach them flirting techniques to get Tadano's attention.
Shizuka Odoka (小戸日 静, Odoka Shizuka)
Odoka looks like a vengeful spirit, specifically Sadako from the Ring franchise or Kayako Saeki from the Ju-On movies. She has long black hair, which falls over her eyes, and tends to stand stooped over. She first appears as a scarer in a haunted house during Komi's first school year's culture festival.^{Ch. 70} Her name is a play on words with odokashii (脅かしい), "intimidating/scary".
Doji (土地)
Doji is a clumsy girl who constantly trips and falls over. When trying to ask Komi for her contact information, she drops her smartphone out of the window.^{Ch. 258} Her name is a pun on ドジ (doji), meaning "blunder" or "clumsy".
Moe Ashitano (明日野 or 蘆田野 萌枝, Ashitano Moe) (Note: The name is written as 明日野 in chapters 135 and as 蘆田野 in chapter 258.)
Ashitano is a cheerful upper-class lady of a wealthy family, but has a very weak endurance. She quickly burns out and loses all energy after a taxing task^{Ch. 258}, or any kind of action in general. But she apparently finds satisfaction in burning out as well. The way she is drawn when burned out and her name are allusions to the boxing manga Ashita no Joe, and her father himself is an allusion to the manga's protagonist, Yabuki Jo, who also tends to burn out. Her given name moeru (燃える) means "burn".
Hafuri (祝)
Hafuri dresses and acts like a person from the time of the Japanese bubble economy and still uses a pager.^{Ch. 258} Her name is a pun on the Japanese transliteration of "bubbly" baburii (バブリー).
Kuroko Usui (臼井 黒子, Usui Kuroko)
Usui is a student wearing a face-concealing cloth mask who believes that no one is able to see or notice him.^{Ch. 323} However, he always has a helping hand to his classmates from the sidelines. At the end of their school year, he is surprised to learn that Komi and the other students had always noticed him and his contributions to the class. Showing their gratitude and reaffirming his place among them. As of chapter 384, he's only had three appearances in the manga, with his dialogue implying that his character was simply forgotten by the author early on.

== Third year classmates ==
Yuka Shiroki (白木 由佳, Shiroki Yuka)
Yuka is a girl who belongs to Manbagi's original trio of gyaru friends. Having been introduced in second year, she joins Komi and Tadano's class in third year. She displays common gyaru traits, wearing strong makeup and brimming with personality. Despite her easy-going nature, Shiroki is actually one of the best academic students at Itan High School. She tells others to call her "Yukapoyo".
Yuragi Emoyama (江藻山 ゆらぎ, Emoyama Yuragi)
Emoyama is a girl who enjoys moments of life that induce feelings of emotion. She reacts strongly to such moments, up to the point of fainting, and comments them with her catchphrase "Emo!".^{Ch. 216} Emoyama is almost unnaturally aware of emotional events in her schoolmate's lives, even if she is not present herself. She attributes her knowledge to a strong sense of intuition^{Ch. 426}, but it's also likened as an inexplicable sixth sense. She is introduced in second year as a student in a parallel class, before becoming Komi's classmate in third year. Emoyama is a strong supporter of Tadano's and Komi's relationship and always watches over their progress. Later on, she instigates their first accidental kiss (brush of the lips) by covertly pushing Tadano. Feeling frustrated knowing how much Tadano and Komi desired to kiss each other but slow to take action, she tried to take matters into her own hands. An action that she came to deeply regret and caused her to stay away from school, feeling guilty that she might've inadvertently strained their relationship. When Komi and Tadano came to visit Emoyama, Komi assures her that is not the case, relieving Emoyama and establishing a friendship with her. Her name is a pun on the word "emo".
Mako Ojousa (小帖佐 真胡, Ojōsa Mako), Tonatsu Hanya (半屋 十夏, Hanya Tonatsu), and Towa Bosa (菩茶 冨和, Bosa Towa)
Ojōsa, Hanya, and Bosa are Nakanaka's classmates in their second year at Itan High School, and classmates of Komi in their third year. Ojōsa is very feminine and polite and is often the one to speak on behalf of the three. Hanya is loud and cheerful, who also helps run her family owned bakery, sometimes offering bread to others. Bosa has a dreamy demeanor, often staring blankly into space. Despite her spacey persona, she was revealed as the best academic student of third year.^{Ch. 376} They befriend Nakanaka after Yamai teases her for being alone,^{Ch. 156} and later form the band "Perro Rabioso" together with both of them.^{Ch. 235} Ojōsa plays the guitar, Bosa the bass, and Hanya is at the drums.
Lily Sukida (鋤田 リリー, Sukida Rirī)
Sukida is a girl who is very much into yuri fiction. She ships Nakanaka and Yamai as Yama x Naka.^{eg. Ch. 137} "Lily" is the English translation of the Japanese word yuri (百合). Thus, her complete name can be read as yuri suki da (百合好きだ), "loves yuri".
Muzuka Shiina (椎名 むずか, Shiina Muzuka)
Shiina is a girl who is very difficult and intractable. She often switches her mood in conversations, remains aloof in group activities, or will challenge others irrationally. During the school battle royale, she berated Komi and her persona when Komi tried to stop her from quitting the game. Komi eventually won her over and Shiina has since been slowly warming up to her. According to her, she always hated when people put expectations on her from her achievements, feeling it to be a burden. At some point, this dislike evolved into a dislike for social interactions, a "happy atmosphere". Especially when she finds it easier to keep to herself alone. Nevertheless, towards the end of their school year both she and Komi have grown to have a mutual understanding of each other's personalities. With Shiina being friendly enough to be of help to Komi, or sign each others' yearbooks. Shiina has heavily pierced ears and mostly wears a hoodie over her uniform. Her name is a play on words with the Japanese word for "difficult", muzukashii (難しい).
Machi Omakawa (小間川 まち, Omakawa Machi)
Omakawa is a girl who had always wanted to be called cute since middle school. She would try to compliment others in order to receive a similar response, but would fail because of the oddity of her approach and timing. Komi became the first one to finally call her cute. She enjoys being called cute to the point of feeling strength and energy from it, and even comically producing a visible wave of aura around her. Her family name is a pun on the Japanese phrase omae kawaii (お前かわいい), "You are cute", while her given name is a play on machimasu (待ちます), "I wait". Taken together, her name refers to her waiting to be called cute.
Hafuru Ogiya (荻谷 把布留, Ogiya Hafuru)
Ogiya is known for always using a pacifier, wearing a baby bib, and conversing in baby talk. This contrasts his otherwise handsome features. He still retains the mentality and behavior of a normal high schooler, and is able to conduct a traditional tea ceremony. He soon becomes a new friend to Tadano and shown to be quite devoted to him. Similar to Komi, he had a past of being popular with students, but was unhappy due to the consequences of his popularity, as he felt that he was more admired for his looks than for his personality. As a result, he chose to "become" a baby in order to lose that popularity. Due to his bad experiences, he isolated himself and was afraid to make new friends. After becoming Tadano's friend, he later apologizes to Komi for avoiding her previously, to which Komi eventually convinces him to be her friend as well. His name is made up from baby noises.
Koto Kyouno (京ノ 古都, Kyōno Koto)
Kyouno speaks in an antiquated, dignified Kyoto dialect, and is often seen with a handkerchief in hand. She wants to make friends, but her way of speaking gives the impression that she is being sarcastic and condescending. Her name consists of the kanji for "Kyoto" (京都) and "old" (古).
You Fuki (蕗 陽, Fuki Yō)
Fuki is extremely clumsy. In this, he is the male counterpart of Doji, although his own clumsiness results in causing destruction around him or just incapable of performing actions normally. His clumsiness is so excessive that he is always worried of being seen as a liability or just generally unliked. However, being encouraged by his classmates helps him to try his best. His name is homophone to fukiyou (不器用), meaning "clumsy".
Kyara Nanoda (名野田 キャラ, Nanoda Kyara)
Nanoda is a normal girl who uses her last name as her catchphrase and be a "nanoda" character, which is a common manga/anime trope. Although she realizes it embarrasses her to do so, she still commits to it because she feels that she cannot make friends if she does not have a unique character. She's shown to also have a more forward and sassy side during the cultural festival. nanoda (なのだ) is a Japanese affirmative phrase, which can be translated with "It is!" or "it is surely so" (Or "For Realsies" in the VIZ Media translation). Her name is a pun on nanoda kyara (なのだキャラ), meaning literally "nanoda character".
Teruka Kire (吉礼 照佳, Kire Teruka)
Kire bears an angered expression on her face, making others believe she always bitter about something. In truth, she is just squinting her eyes because she has very bad eyesight and refuses to wear glasses or contact lenses. She has a quite docile personality in contrast to her angry looks. She also desires to make friends. kirete (キレて) means "get angry".
Teruyoshi Jimochi (慈餅 輝善, Jimochi Teruyoshi)
Jimochi is a boy who suffers from hemorrhoids.
Minako Iida
Iida is a girl who suffers from constant stomach aches. Always taking excessive amounts of medication that don't seem to help much.
Maheto Haheto (波辺土 真辺斗, Haheto Maheto)
Haheto is always seen carrying two hand puppets with him wherever he goes; the innocent and friendly Bear (Kuma-kun (くまくん)), and the maniacal "Evil God Phlegm Vezel" (Jashin Furemu Vezel-kun (邪神フレムヴェゼルくん)) who looks like a frog with horns. Haheto seems to substitute his own existence in place of his puppets, as he will not respond when he is addressed directly. During the school training camp, he even made bedspreads for his two puppets but not for himself, lying on the bare floor with no blanket. When speaking through his puppets, Kuma will always respond happily, while Phlegm Vezel will always state his desire to cause chaos.
Luna Neguse (音久瀬 月, Neguse Runa)
Luna has a severe case of bedhead, and is always seen with various outlandish hair shapes. Though she doesn't seem to mind it. Neguse (寝癖) means "bedhead".
Fukuyoka Mochi (六智 福代華, Mochi Fukuyoka)
Mochi is a pudgy girl. She appears to be slowly taking a liking to Saotome after he assisted her a few times. Her name is a pun on pukupuku (ぷくぷく), meaning "pudgy".
Kanchi Gai (甲斐 かんち, Gai Kanchi)
Kanchi tends to misunderstand things and actions. Getting the wrong idea and making conclusions that aren't entirely accurate. As such, he comes to believe that Komi is romantically interested in him (when having done nothing), and mentally declares that there is now a relationship between them. Yet, he is somehow oblivious to the fact that Tadano is Komi's official partner. When he finally takes notice of Tadano's presence with her, he then challenges Tadano to a duel for Komi, much to his confusion. Through a series of small games (losing each one) and an eventual brawl (using timid slaps), he eventually admits defeat and entrusts Komi to Tadano. The next day, he treats Tadano with close friendliness, declaring that they are now best friends. Showing that in the end, Kanchi is just a harmless guy. Kanchigai (勘違い) means "misunderstanding".
Yakugaku Komata (独楽田 薬学, Komata Yakugaku)
Komata is always seen fiddling with test tubes and wearing a lab coat. He has a tendency of displaying a mad scientist-like behavior, grinning and snickering maniacally when using or offering items from his inventory. Yet, he has no menacing intentions at all and is actually very logical and level-headed. His items themselves are all safe and normal everyday things such as energy drinks or specialized baking flour. Yakugaku (薬学) means "pharmaceutics".
Tsubo Hamaru (壺 葉円, Hamaru Tsubo)
Hamaru is a girl who is easily made to laugh. Either by amusement in conversations, finding humor in everyday objects, or laughing for no apparent reason. Her name is an allusion to the Japanese phrase tsubo ga asai (ツボが浅い) (literally: "someone's pressure points are shallow"), which can be roughly translated to "being ticklish" or "being easily made to laugh".
Shōta Kori (狐里 祥太, Kori Shouta)
Kori is a student with a stern face and demeanor, and who is very obsessive about every detail, rules, authenticity, craftsmanship, and many other small nitpicks. Anything he does or is asked of him is done very thoroughly and accurately, often to an unnecessary level, but still finds enjoyment in what he does. If he starts a new hobby or job, he would treat it as if he were competing for it, going to extreme lengths for perfection. This behavior can cause him to appear strict and blunt when talking to people, such as when he was involved in the ramen making team in the cultural festival, where his group felt that he was being very harsh. But in actuality, he's just simply being honest and doesn't mean any harm. Which he proves by being kind enough to help or compliment his classmates.
Takaomo Fuechi (笛池 貴重, Fuechi Takaomo)
Fuechi always addresses himself in the royal "we" majestic plural. He often tends to comment on seemingly sensual happenings, expressing his excitement over them as "that really got to us!". Yet, he does have certain principles and will voice criticism if something feels too sexually extreme. He is known for a prominent small mustache.
Kaoru Fukitsu (吹津 香, Fukitsu Kaoru) (Note: Mistakenly transcribed as Fusatsu Kaoro in the Viz Media translation.)
Fukitsu is a girl who has a drastically wearied and worn out face, but is ironically cheerful and peppy personality-wise. She apparently used to be on the cheer-leading squad, but was dismissed because her haggard expression wasn't fit for the role.
Marin Saotome (早乙女 馬琳, Saotome Marin)
Saotome has the appearance of a yakuza-like delinquent, always wearing dark shades and a sash, as well as having a hot-headed temper. But in contrast to his demeanor, Saotome actually has cute tiny eyes, and many of his mannerisms, though appearing wicked, are actually innocent. Like having an alcohol bottle but is filled calpico soft drink, or sniffing suspicious powder that's actually baby powder. Even when seeming tough, he also has a level of respect and good will. Such as taking over Mochi's tasks but assuring her that some jobs are better suited for men than women.

== Teachers and other students ==
Homeroom Teacher (担任の先生, Tannin no sensei)
An unnamed woman with glasses and a hair bun, who always wears a track suit. She is Komi's homeroom teacher in the first two years at school.^{Ch. 2} She becomes promoted to the school's head teacher in third year. On occasion, she is shown to be lazy and irresponsible. She takes advantage of Tadano's helpfulness,^{Ch. 58} entrusts important duties to someone else, falls asleep in transport on school trips, and is willing to drink alcohol on student supervision.^{Ch. 281}
Miwa Omojiri (重尻 美葉, Omojiri Miwa)
Omojiri is an assistant teacher in Komi's second year class at school,^{Ch. 158} and her homeroom teacher in her third year.^{Ch. 325} Outwardly, she keeps a proper, strict, and dutiful appearance, barely showing any visible emotion. In private, she is secretly lazy and disorganized. She is easily drained by her work and her daily errands, so much that she often collapses at home from exhaustion and sleeps through large parts of the weekend. When Omojiri accidentally meets Komi outside of school, she tells her a made-up story about a fire to excuse her unkempt appearance. When Komi shows her friendliness and compassion due to the story, Omojiri relaxes her proper persona and becomes more easy-going. Her family name Omojiri is a play on words on the phrase shiri ga omoi (尻が重い) (literally: "the butt is heavy"), which means "being lazy" and alludes to her demeanor outside school.
Chika Netsuno (根津野 ちか, Netsuno Chika)
Voiced by: Megumi Han^{Ep. 10 credits} (Japanese); Suzie Yeung (English)
Netsuno is a highly competitive, second-year student who is hot-blooded. She has flame inspired physical traits such as her fire-like hair and flame styled eyes. In the first year Sports Festival, she originally dismissed Komi as competitor, stating that she felt no "hot" passion from her. Netsuno competed against Komi on the class relay race with them as the final runners. With Komi persevering even after a fall, Netsuno emerges as the victor, but declares that she felt Komi's passion after all, handshaking her.
In second year, and her last year at school, she returns to compete with Komi in the same race out of sportsmanship. And although Komi races with more vigor than before, Netsuno still emerges victorious. The sight of Komi's visible frustration endears her, still thanking her for the match, and finally exchanging contacts. After her graduation, it is heavily implied that she is related to new first year student Aoi Netsuno, who shares her fire traits and hot-bloodedness. How specifically, is yet to be said. Her name netsu no chika (熱のちか) can be interpreted literally as "underground heat" or figuratively as "highly enthusiastic".
Gorimi (檎林美)
Gorimi is a large and muscular upper classman who oversees the school library committee.^{Ch. 36, 159} She is known for enforcing quiet in the library by slapping perpetrators with her paper fan. After her eventual graduation, she is replaced by a robot with her likeness.^{Ch. 372} Gorimi's name is a pun on gorira mitame (ゴリラ 見た目), roughly translating into "looks like a gorilla".
The Four Heavenly Kings (四天王, Shi tennou)
A group of delinquents who enrolled in Itan High School in Komi's second year. They apparently earned their name by defeating 172 other delinquents in a single month, despite the students of Itan never having heard of them. They initially entered the school with the intention of defeating Itan's own delinquents, by first taking on their supposed leader "Komi" (info told to them by Najimi). Upon entering Komi's class, they assume that Katai is "Komi" based on nothing but his appearance. They try different methods to challenge Katai, but each one fails as Katai never noticed them. In the end, Katai unknowingly manages to back them off. In the third-year battle royale, the Heavenly Kings took the role of leadership for the school's second year students. Managing to take the first years captive and challenge the third years, before eventually being defeated.

- Gorou Suteno (捨野 五狼, Suteno Gorou), is the leader of the Heavenly Kings. Known for always wearing a bandana that covers his brows. Suteno has a very tough disposition and is willing to run headfirst into any kind of challenge in front of him. He is also somewhat respectful: announcing his presence when entering a room, carrying Hamaki when she tripped, or giving the first years the option of helping him during the battle royale. He also has a sensitive side, as he will get depressed when he is ignored or defeated easily. He often tries to challenge Katai in various clashes, still believing his name to be "Komi".
- Hajime Gokudou (極堂 一, Gokudou Hajime), is the member who least looks like a delinquent, wearing his school uniform properly as well as a monocle. Although he appears dignified, he will still display delinquent behaviors such as confrontation and a willingness for violence.
- Yae Hamaki (浜木 八重, Hamaki Yae), is the only female member who is always seen with a face mask. Despite her fierceness, she still has maidenly qualities. In different occasions, it's shown that she has a romantic crush on Suteno. Underneath her mask, she has braces.
- Makina Kusari (九沙理 蒔苗, Kusari Makina), is the largest member who has a piercing on his left brow. Like the others, he is loyal to Suteno. He is shown at times to have masochistic traits.

Setoka Ichō (伊調 せとか, Ichou Setoka)
Ichou is the former student council president who was introduced in Isagi's story on what inspired her to run in the presidential election, appearing to be a dutiful and altruistic person. Upon meeting her however, it's revealed that she only has the position for her own amusement. Ichou is actually an eccentric and carefree girl who is prone to random foolery. Tending to whine like a child and having admitted to repeating a school year. She can also be selfish when inflicting her own bizarre ideas and impulses upon the students and others. After her step-down as president and her later graduation, she returns in Komi's third year as Itan High school's new substitute Principal. Under the claim that she is actually the granddaughter of the school's founder. Her name is pun on 生徒会長 (setokai chou), "President of the Student Council".
Arisa Anchi (安智 有梨沙, Anchi Arisa)
Anchi was introduced in a girl "mixer" arranged by Najimi for Komi. She is a sharp tongued girl who has a habit of being blunt and rude to those she's talking to. Claiming that she likes to exploit faults in people and that she will always ridicule any possible friends. But it's apparent that she does feel guilt when doing so, being noticeably startled when she feels her words went too far. Hinting that underneath her exterior, she is actually a more tender and friendly person than she seems. With Komi and the others admitting that her insults never feel cruel intentioned. Her name is a pun on アンチある (anchi aru), roughly meaning "being antagonistic".
Saki Tsuzurafuji (葛藤 咲, Tsuzurafuji Saki)
Tsuzurafuji was introduced in a girl "mixer" arranged by Najimi for Komi. She has a tendency to greatly overthink the situations around her. Often overanalyzing every word said or action done. She is otherwise a simple girl who has a talent of making her eyes look in different directions. The kanji in her family name can alternatively be read as 葛藤 (kattou), meaning "conflicted".
Yukari Kogoen (小御縁 ゆかり, Kogoen Yukari)
Kogoen was introduced in a girl "mixer" arranged by Najimi for Komi. She is a girl who has an elegant and dignified demeanor, but has an extremely soft voice. A voice so quiet that barely anyone can make out her words, and that not even using a megaphone can raise her volume. 小声 (ko goe) means "whisper" or "low voice".
Ribbon Imotō (芋島 りぼん, Imotō Ribon)
Imotō is a boy (Note: Their name is usually followed in the manga by the symbol for male ♂ to clarify this.) who desires to loved by everyone. To achieve this, he chose to become everyone's little sister.^{Ch. 359} As a little sister, they generally wear a girl's uniform and a ribbon in their hair, hence their nickname "Ribbon" (their actual given name is Kazuyuki (和幸)). Imotō first appears as their class representative at a school sports festival.^{Ch. 209} While Imotō generally acts cute befitting their role as little sister, they also have a scheming side: in an attempt to get Komi to become their 100th elder sibling, Imotō tried to get compromising material on Tadano by stalking him for a year, who they perceived to be in the way. When Imotō eventually concluded how nice of a person he actually was, Imotō became overcome with desire to be Tadano's sibling instead, wanting to be his "number one". Although Tadano was confused at this development, he still kindly offers Imotō his friendship. Their name is a pun on the Japanese word for little sister, imōto (妹).
Komorebi Hiki (日岐 こもれび, Hiki Komorebi)
Hiki is with 180 cm unusually tall for a Japanese girl of her age.^{Ch. 275} She is very self-conscious of her height, so she spent the last year in middle-school as a shut in. She is Inaka's younger cousin. Hiki meets Komi when she visits a shrine in her hometown where she wants to pray for success in her high-school entrance exam. When Hiki collapses due to her anxiousness, Komi comes to her help and assuages Hiki's fears.
Hiki joins Itan High School when Komi starts her third year there.^{Ch. 326} With her tallness, Hiki is crucial in the first year students winning the school-wide battle royale (with toy guns).^{Ch. 326} She becomes good friends with her classmates Aoi Netsuno and Susumi Shujou.^{Ch. 334, 351}
Hiki's given name is homophone to 木漏れ日 (komorebi), meaning "the sunlight filtering through trees". This word describes the light shafts and the patterns on the ground created by the sunlight shining through the leaves of a tree. Taken together, the name Hiki Komorebi is a play on words with hikikomori, the Japanese term for shut ins.
Taketoshi Wakai (和貝 武利, Wakai Taketoshi)
Wakai is a boy who joins Manbagi's third year class as her new seatmate and is also the captain of the school's soccer team. He has a case of gynophobia and avoids interacting with females in general. According to him, talking to girls makes him overly conscious and causes him a lot of stress and anxiety. Feeling that he has to appeal to them or otherwise they will look down on him. Wakai lives with his widowed father, as his mother passed away sometime during his childhood. It's often implied that his mother's death has some influence over his anxiety with girls.
He also suffers from low self-esteem, mentally berating himself over his own worth, and blaming himself for mistakes. Wakai starts to reluctantly develop a friendship with Manbagi, mainly because she approaches him various times out of her own friendly nature. With his gynophobia, this initially stresses him further, confused by her over-friendliness. But when getting to know Manbagi, he starts to get used to her and begins to open up more. Later on, and motivated to want to try taking a chance with Manbagi, he invites her to spend some time at the summer festival. After which, he comes to enjoy their time together. Later that evening, when Manbagi starts to belittle herself regarding the failed relationship with Tadano, he attempts to assure her on how amazing she really is. But when trying to yell over the fireworks, unfortunate timing makes it sound like a love confession, surprising them both.
Feeling panicked, Wakai attempts to avoid her at school, for fear of what her reply would be regarding him. After then being cornered by Manbagi and pressured into explaining himself, he realizes how much he's truly come to like her and takes responsibility for his accidental confession. Manbagi, while happy about his feelings for her, tells him to give her more time to reply. Later on, with his team's semifinal match approaching, Wakai starts to feel stressed and worried waiting for Manbagi's reply. But when she comes to see him off at his match, he finds the comfort to organize himself and eventually leads his team to victory. After which, when Manbagi congratulates him from the bleachers, he finds the courage to once again proclaim his feelings for her and confesses again. To which Manbagi accepts and they become a couple. With his new relationship with Manbagi, Wakai no longer feels anxious with her and is always happy to be with her. His name can be read as 若い 健人志 (wakai taketoshi), meaning "a young and healthy person".

== Family members ==
=== Komi's family ===
Shōsuke Komi (古見 笑介, Komi Shōsuke)
Voiced by: Junya Enoki (Japanese); Jack Dillon (English)
Shōsuke is Shōko's younger brother. Like his sister and father, he tends to be silent, but unlike them he is perfectly capable of talking but just chooses not to.^{Ch. 86} He is tall and handsome and easily gets the attention of girls, but is uninterested.^{Ch. 68} Like his father in high school, Shōsuke is sportive and gifted with his hands.^{Ch. 145, 173} And shown to be capable of excelling in any kind of task or skill.
Shōsuke has a far more introverted nature than his sister, and prefers to keep to himself most of the time. But he is also quite antisocial, as interacting with anyone, even his family, appears to be bothersome to him. Even considering the timid Yamada to still be annoying. He has an unwillingness to leave his house, and will avoid most interactions with people, except when it's about transacting business (paying at the register). He nevertheless has a good-natured side as well, such as saving Tadano and Rei on different occasions, and repairing Rei's toy. Despite past meetings between himself and Tadano, when Shōsuke had to accompany his family during those times. He's the only family member who has never had any one-on-one interactions with Tadano, so much of his personal thoughts on Tadano are left ambiguous. Other than acknowledging Tadano as a good guy who makes his sister and family happy.
While Shōko is in her second year, he attends the Kisai High School, where he ends up as seatmates with Tadano's younger sister Hitomi.^{Ch. 133} Hitomi mistakes his introversion for a social anxiety disorder and immediately makes it her duty to help him overcome it. Her incessant attempts to forcibly push him into social interactions tend to exhaust Shōsuke.^{Ch. 133, 145} Although it is later implied that despite all of Hitomi's shenanigans, he does somewhat appreciate her company. Katai's younger sister Ai falls in love with him, but he has yet to show if he is aware of these feelings, or if they are mutual.^{Ch. 182, 198}
It is later revealed that surprisingly, he was once a cheerful happy child with a personality more like his mother's. But then a few years later, that personality suddenly disappeared and Shōsuke became the kind of person that he is now, and never having smiled again. After a day of school, he comes across an old elementary classmate who believes he understands why Shōsuke doesn't smile any more, which he tries to make up for through a competition rematch, where Hitomi ends up tagging along. After finishing their competition and returning home with Hitomi, Hitomi discloses that she feels she knows the real reason that Shōsuke has his current personality, and that his old classmate is only just a part of the answer. While Shōsuke remains silent, she deduces that Shōsuke is at his core, simply not interested in other people. That maybe his smiling as a child was just a way to avoid getting familiar with others, or just to prevent any kind of conflict. A declaration that Shōsuke appears to have misgivings about. But she also concedes that his past cheerfulness was also genuine, and that Shōsuke most likely felt guilty seeing that happiness can't solve all problems with what happened with his classmate. She also attributes his current personality as being part of the awkward teenage phase. But above all, she believes that it has do with his sister Shōko. Feeling that no matter how much he tried, he couldn't make his lonesome sister smile. And that as a result, he chose to instead adopt his sister's personality, as a means to make her feel less alone. Another declaration that Shōsuke is unable to deny.
His name is the same play on words as his sister's on the word komyushō} (コミュ症; communication disorder).
Shūko Komi (古見 秀子, Komi Shūko)
Voiced by: Kikuko Inoue (Japanese); Dorothy Fahn (English)
Shūko is Shōko's and Shōsuke's mother and a full-time housewife. She looks very much like her daughter that she sometimes gets mistaken as her or as her sister.^{Ch. 22, 55} Unlike Shōko, her mother has a very outgoing personality and describes herself as "eternal 17-year old", somewhat to Shōko's embarrassment.
Shūko met her future husband Masayoshi in high school when she was actually 17.^{Ch. 125} She was somewhat of a delinquent at that time and not interested in school. Masayoshi caught her eye with his good looks, his kindness, and his skills in craftsmanship and cooking. It was later revealed that her parents died when she was a child, which likely contributed to her initial delinquency. She was then raised by her grandmother up until her last year of high school, when her grandmother passed away as well. Grieving about being left alone after her funeral, Shūko was proposed to by Masayoshi, who promised that he would not let her be alone. After seeing Tadano becoming Shōko's first friend and interacting with her more frequently, she becomes fonder of Tadano and supportive of their relationship. At some point, similar to her husband, she becomes enamoured with Tadano, wanting to spend time with him or having him with their family.
Her maiden name is 新見 (Niimi) which can be translated as "new look/view" and is effectively the opposite of komi (古見), meaning "old look/view", alluding to her character being opposite to the rest of her family.
Masayoshi Komi (古見 将賀, Komi Masayoshi)
Voiced by: Mitsuaki Hoshino (Japanese); Xander Mobus (English)
Masayoshi is Shōko's and Shōsuke's father. Like his children, he talks very little and seems to suffer from a similar social anxiety disorder as his daughter. Somehow, Masayoshi and Shōko manage to communicate without words.^{Ch. 42, 74} Similar to Shōko, he can appear very intimidating to people not familiar to him.
He is of the same age as his wife Shūko, who he met at 17 in high school. He organised a flashmob to ask her on a date^{Ch. 153} and took her with a motorcycle to the beach.^{Ch. 166}
When Tadano and Shōko start to go out, Masayoshi "kidnaps" Tadano before their first date to put him to a test.^{Ch. 317} On that occasion, they visit an aquarium where Masayoshi reveals himself to be enthusiastic about sea animals. After that "date", he becomes somewhat enamoured with Tadano.^{Ch. 349} He later takes Tadano also to a sauna to get him to know better.^{Ch. 364}
Yuiko Komi (古見 結子, Komi Yuiko)
Voiced by: Kumiko Takizawa
Yuiko is Masayoshi's mother and Shōko's grandmother and the matriarch of the Komi family. Her husband having already passed away for some time. She lives in the countryside – in the same village where Inaka comes from –, where the family tends to visit her on holidays.^{Ch. 45, 91–92, 184–185, 271–272} Yuiko is shown to have a somewhat strict persona that is counterbalanced with an underlying kindness. Also revealing a playful side when she engages with her grandchildren in games, usually with their allowance at stake. It is later revealed that Yuiko always had a serious, no-nonsense personality when she was young. Shown when she was interacting with her future husband Shojiro Komi, who would always assure her of her underlying kindness. Prior to Shōko dating Tadano, she would always express to Komi about dealing with boys, and that she would discipline "Tadano" if she would get the chance. After finally meeting him during a one-month period of stay Komi arranged for studying, she's shown to take an almost immediate liking to Tadano, due to his character and how he interacts with her and Shōko. A liking that Shōko's relatives, Ryōko and Sadayoshi, also quickly noticed.
Akira Komi (古見 晶, Komi Akira)
Voiced by: Kaede Hondo
Akira is Komi's young cousin.^{Ch. 45} She is the daughter of Ryōko Komi (古見 良子, Komi Ryōko) and Sadayoshi Komi (古見 定義, Komi Sadayoshi). Akira is shy but likes Shōko and loves to play with her.^{Ch. 45, 91–92, 184–185, 271–272} She also a tendency to burst into tears for many things, even when she is happy. However, when competition is involved, specifically in gambling, she displays a different side to her of a more confident ego. They tend to meet when Shōko's family visit their grandmother. After Shōko and Tadano started dating, Akira finally meets Tadano during his one month stay at their grandmother's house. Initially, Akira was somewhat defensive about Tadano's character, though still speaking with courtesy. As well as being a bit possessive of her own closeness with Shōko. Like other characters, she would question Shōko about Tadano's averageness. Although Tadano would soon win her favor and approval the next day after helping her. Likening Tadano's appeal to that of a devoted butler.

=== Tadano's family ===
Hitomi Tadano (只野 瞳, Tadano Hitomi)
Voiced by: Maaya Uchida (Japanese); Suzie Yeung (English)
Hitomi is Hitohito's younger sister. She is very talkative and assertive, and tends to bombard new acquaintances with questions.^{Ch. 133, 182} From the second year of the story on, she attends Kisai High School, where she is classmates with Komi's younger brother Shōsuke and Katai's little sister Ai. As Shōsuke's seatmate, she presumes that he suffers from a communication disorder and takes it upon herself to help him make friends.^{Ch. 133} Which she does by forcing him to interact with her and their classmates, and pressuring him into partaking in class activities.^{Ch. 145} She has no romantic interest in him and only sees him as friend.^{Ch. 198}
In contrast to her brother, who is average at everything and anything. Hitomi is shown to be talented and unique. She is able to accurately mimic Shōsuke's voice and speak through ventriloquism, skilled in Judo, being sportive and blocking a goal shot from Shōsuke, able to overpower people bigger than her ^{Ch. 182}, and correcting the mistakes at Hitohito's attempt at a novel. Many times, she appears impulsive and single-minded, usually jumping to conclusions about people that are incorrect. But when she one day tags along with Shōsuke after he meets an old classmate, she proclaims that she feels she knows why Shōsuke has the personality that he does. Revealing that Hitomi does indeed share the same accurate perceptiveness as her brother, deducing different theories about Shōsuke that hit close to the truth. Though, it is unknown to what capacity this perceptiveness works for other people. In the same conversation, Hitomi also discloses that she is aware of how annoyed Shōsuke is with her shenanigans, but claims that she likes him anyway, even with his anti-socialness, since he still joins and hangs out with her regardless.
Hitomi gives her brother romantic advice on several occasions, such as helping him buy a present for Komi for White Day without knowing who the recipient is. She also quickly notices the romantic attraction between Hitohito and Komi,^{Ch. 50, 182} and tries to encourage the relationship. However, for a time, both she and her mother came to believe that Hitohito might be gay, based on misunderstandings of the apparently romantic-like friendship with Katai, and Tadano cross-dressing on several occasions ^{Ch. 68, 224, 307, 338}. They eventually relent on this belief once Tadano formally introduced Komi as his girlfriend to them. Hitomi and Hitohito share a single room in their family's apartment.
Jeanne Tadano (只野 慈安布, Tadano Jannu)
Jeanne is Hitohito's and Hitomi's mother. She meets Komi's family first when their families coincidentally make a holiday trip to the same campsite.^{Ch. 143} Her face is not shown before Chapter 338. Believing Hitohito to be gay for a while due to Hitomi's reports, she is initially puzzled when Hitohito introduced Komi as his girlfriend.^{Ch. 338} She is at first intimidated by Komi, but after getting to know her better, she becomes happy about having Komi as part of her family.^{Ch. 338–340}
Her name is a play on words with tada no janai (ただのじゃない), meaning "not normal", probably referring to her (for a Japanese woman) unusual given name.
Tadano's Father
Hitohito's and Hitomi's father only appears twice in the manga as of chapter 367. Once when the Tadano and Komi family happen to meet each other at a campsite.^{Ch. 143} And second when the Tadano family (and Najimi) visited their family home for New Year's. His face is not shown, nor is a name mentioned.

=== Others ===
Ai Katai (片居 愛, Katai Ai)
Ai is Makoto Katai's younger sister. She has long blond hair and usually wears a trenchcoat over her school uniform. In contrast to her brother, who only gets mistaken for a delinquent due to his physique and demeanor, Ai is actually one. She acts tough, has no interest in school, and gets into gang fights.^{Ch. 182}
Ai visits the same high school as Shōsuke Komi and Hitomi and is classmates with them. She instantly falls in love with Shōsuke, revealing her softer side.
Her name can be read as katai ai (固い 愛), meaning "tough love".

Kometani's sisters
During a school trip, Kometani Chūshaku mentions he has several sister, which remain unnamed.^{Ch. 286, 288} There is no other information about them, other than they have boyfriends.

== Other characters ==
Rei Natsukido (夏木戸 澪, Natsukido Rei)
Rei is the daughter of one of Komi's mother's school friends and stays at the Komis' house for a week over the summer holiday when her parents are away on a business trip.^{Ch. 168–177} She is in the second year of elementary school.
Initially detached and emotionally aloof, she slowly warms to Shōko, her friends, and the other members of the Komi household. When she realizes that she is becoming attached to Komi, she runs away. With Najimi's help, Komi manages to find her and bring her home. Rei reveals that she had to move very often due to her parents' work, meaning she had to say farewell to her friends often and only after a short time. As a result, Rei decided to rather stay emotionally distant and not become attached to anyone else. When Komi explains to her that this is an opportunity to make many friends all over the world, Rei finally agrees. Before parting, Komi and Rei bet who can make 100 friends more quickly. After Rei and her family move to the United States, she manages to quickly befriend the foul-mouthed Mila, who somewhat begrudgingly accepts. When Komi is in the US on her class trip, she manages to meet up with Rei.^{Ch. 284}
Momo Natsukido (夏木戸 百々, Natsukido Momo)
Momo is Rei's mother^{Ch. 177} and an old school friend of Komi's mother Shūko.^{Ch. 153} For work related reasons, she and her husband have to move regularly, also internationally.
Kamiko Arai (新井 嘉美子, Arai Kamiko)
Arai is a trainee in the beauty salon Komi frequents, where she washes the customers' hair and sweeps the floor.^{Ch. 34} She takes Komi's silence initially for disapproval, which makes her highly insecure. However, when Komi finally manages to express her gratitude without words, Arai is encouraged again.
Her name arai kami ko (洗い髪子) translates literally to "hair-washing girl".
Maki Karisu (雁巣 真姫, Karisu Maki)
Karisu is the hair-dresser in the beauty salon Komi visits and a very charismatic personality.^{Ch. 34} She knows Komi since she was a little kid. Thus, she is accustomed to Komi's silence and can easily understand her. It is later revealed that she is single and friends with Teshigawara, Tenjouin, and Toujouin.^{Ch. 367}
Her name is a pun on the Japanese word for "charisma", karisuma (カリスマ).
Chocolat (ショコラ, Shokora)
Chocolat is a black female cat living in the cat café Komi visits and the "boss" of all the cats there.^{Ch. 81} Normally distant to people, she takes pity on Komi when all the other cats avoid her and sees her dejected. Realizing that Komi is more thoughtful of the cat's feelings and would rather have them come to her, she lets Komi pet and cuddle her. The café eventually grants Komi the title "Chocolat Mama", because it's assumed that Chocolat became attached to her.^{Ch. 214}
Hoshiko Teshigawara (勅使河原 欲子, Teshigawara Hoshiko)
Teshigawara is an office lady who is in real urgent need of some tissues.^{Ch. 43} She manages to get some from Komi who happens to hand out pocket tissues while helping Najimi on their summer job. Some time later, she encounters Nakanaka on a late night stroll and plays along when Nakanaka mimes using her umbrella as a gun.^{Ch. 174} Teshigawara is friends with Karisu, Tenjouin, and Toujouin and like all of them single.^{Ch. 367}
Her name is a pun on the Japanese phrase tisshu ga hoshii (ティッシュがほしい; "I need tissues").
Tatsuhito Akido (明戸 達人, Akido Tatsuhito)
Akido is an expert on maid cafés.^{Ch. 67, 238} He has it taken onto him to visit one maid café per day, which leads him to the maid café organised by Komi's class during the school's culture festival. Despite being a critical maid expert, he is still a timid otaku around women. He happens to know Ren Sutejijuku since kindergarten and they mutually despise each other. Although a caption box remarks that they will eventually marry in a few years.
Shōta Shiota (塩田 翔太, Shiota Shōta), Lola Michisato (路里 ローラ, Michisato Rora), Chii Saiko (西湖 ちい, Saiko Chii), and Itsuya Ooki (大木 いつや, Ooki Itsuya)
Shōta, Lola, Saiko and Ooki are four elementary school students living in Komi's neighborhood. They first meet her when Najimi invites them to a snowball fight.^{Ch. 90} They later meet Komi again during summer vacation when they all take part in radio exercises,^{Ch. 167} and then again when Komi and her friends help out selling food at a summer festival.^{Ch. 193} It has been shown that Michisato has a crush on Shiota, and Saiko has a crush on Ooki. And Shiota and Ooki have a close friendship.
Chii's name is a pun on the japanese word chiisai (小さい), meaning "small", despite her being by far the tallest of the four. Similarly is Ooki's name a pun on ooki (大きい), "big", although he is the shortest of the group. Lola's and Shōta's names are puns on lolicon and shotacon respectively.
Ryouko Tenjouin (天上院 旅有子, Tenjouin Ryōko)
Voiced by: Maaya Uchida
Tenjouin is a bus guide on Komi's class's school trip to Kyoto.^{Ch. 105} While highly motivated, she is slightly nervous and occasionally stumbles over words. The students' obvious lack of interest begins to disencourage her until she notices that Komi and Tadano are actually paying attention. She notices the romance between these both and wishes for them be get married.
Tenjouin is friends with Karisu, Teshigawara, and Toujouin and like all of them single.^{Ch. 367}
Her name 添乗員 (Tenjouin) literally means "tour guide".
Ren Sutejijuku (諏手寺宿 蓮, Sutejijuku Ren)
Sutejijuku enthusiastically loves stage plays and visits 1208 theatre performances a year.^{Ch. 230} She is not too discerning when it comes to the choice of the stage plays she visits and also attends random school plays. This leads her to the stage performance by Komi's class during the second year's culture festival where she witnesses a performance by Katai and Tadano (dressed as a girl). Sutejijuku knows maid connoisseur Akido since kindergarten and they mutually despise each other. Although a caption box remarks that they will eventually marry in a few years.
Her name is a play on words with sutējijuku ren (ステージ塾 愛), roughly meaning "love (for) stage school".
Golden Skulls (subject to change) (ゴルデン スカルズ（仮）, Goruden sukaruzu (kari))
The Golden Skulls (subject to change) (Note: The "subject to change" is part of the name.) are a group of teenage boys who appear like typical playboys and attempt to pick up girls during different outings.^{Ch. 165, 268} But they constantly fail to approach any girls for being too shy and fearful.
Homare Toujouin (東条院 誉, Toujouin Homare)
Toujouin is a flight attendant on Komi's class's flight to New York for their second year's class trip.^{Ch. 278} She takes particular care of Komi and is initially dejected by Komi's apparent indifference. A thank-you letter Komi gives her while deboarding restores her spirits, though.
Toujouin is friends with Karisu, Teshigawara, and Tenjouin and like all of them single.^{Ch. 367}
Her name is a play on words with homare toujouin (誉れ 搭乗員), which can be translated as "honorable flight attendant".
Sanjuurokurou Yamada (山田 三十六郎, Yamada Sanjūrokurō)
Yamada is a classmate of Hitomi who more or less by chance gets dragged into a group date of Hitomi, Shōsuke, and Ai.^{Ch. 198} He suspects both Hitomi and Ai might be interested in him romantically,^{Ch. 207} though neither of them actually are.
His given name Sanjuurokurou (三十六郎) means "the thirty-sixth". A recurring gag is that everyone (except Hitohito) keeps getting his name wrong and call him by different numbers, including eleven (十一郎, juuichirou), twenty-two (二十二郎, nijūnirou), and sixty-nine (六十九郎, rokujūkyuurou).^{Ch. 207}
Rami Kawai (河合 羅美, Kawai Rami)
Kawai is an old middle school classmate of Tadano and Najimi who was Tadano's first love, and was the one who rejected him, which caused him to change into his normal persona from this event. It was later revealed that in reality, she herself was in love with Tadano since long before his confession. But she had forced herself to reject him in order to help snap him out of his chuni phase. Feeling that it was an unnecessary aspect for Tadano and preferring him the way he truly is. After first having met Tadano as a child and falling for him, she dedicated the rest of her life to make herself the perfect partner for him within academics, skillset, etc. Despite rejecting him and regretting it, she still promised herself to one day come back to him. After meeting Tadano again along with Komi at a summer training camp, Kawai reveals her affections for Tadano to Komi and challenges her for the right to date him. After Kawai loses to Komi at a competition and they both get to know each other more, Kawai decides instead of stealing Tadano away from Komi, to enter into a polyamorous relationship between all three of them. Although Komi is against the idea and would rather just be friends with Kawai, Kawai decides to become her friend and eventually get Komi to agree to a relationship between them and Tadano.
Because of her efforts to make herself worthy to Tadano, Kawai has gained a disciplined and authoritative personality, being very analytical and punctual. But because of how much she spent studying, she also has an airhead personality, being unfamiliar with actual in person relations. But despite any kind of disciplined or strict personality she has on the outside, Kawai's true personality is more innocent and cute on the inside.
Kawai lost her parents at a young age and moved in with her relatives, the Buta family, who she has since been living with. At first, she was more indifferent to them, since they didn't know how to connect or deal with her distanced behavior, something she admits having still hurt her. Though she eventually found her place among them. But at some point, she began to see and treat the Buta family rather harshly and demeaningly, revealing her more strict side. Which apparently has to do with a realization that the Buta family are rather incompetent in their business ventures, and she essentially had to take over their business to keep them from ruin. Which is a reason why she doesn't consider them family despite being her blood relatives and living with them for years.
The Buta family gladly suffer her treatment however, because of their masochistic traits^{Ch. 401}. Nevertheless, the Butas had sincerely always wanted to connect with her and continue to adore her. Which is why they also thank Tadano for acknowledging them as her family.
Her name is a play on kawaii (可愛いい), the Japanese word for "cute". Alluding to what her personality is really like on the inside.
Maruko Tadano (只野 真瑠子, Tadano Maruko)
Komi meets Maruko during a group selection process for the same college of choice. Maruko is a high school student who wants to study international communication. She describes herself as an "ordinary high school student" and shows a focused and goal-oriented mindset. When the group discussion is derailed by the other participants' eccentric personalities, she reacts irritated. Eventually, Komi's determination reassures her. Afterwards, she joins Komi and the other applicants at a restaurant.
Despite sharing the family name with Hitohito, it is never revealed whether she is in any way related to his family.
Narrator (ナレーション, Narēshon)
Voiced by: Noriko Hidaka (Japanese); Amber May (English)

== Notes ==
- "Ch." and "Vol." are shortened forms for chapter and volume of the Komi Can't Communicate manga
- "Ep." is shortened form for episode and refers to an episode number of the Komi Can't Communicate anime television series
