= Shivyar, Charuymaq =

Shivyar شيويار
- Village
- Location within Iran
- Coordinates: 37°09′59″N 47°06′17″E
- Country: Iran
- Province: East Azerbaijan
- County: Charuymaq
- Bakhsh: Central
- Rural District: Charuymaq-e Markazi

Population (2006)
  - Total: 126
- Time zone: UTC+3:30 (IRST)
  - Summer (DST): UTC+4:30 (IRDT)

Shivyar (Persian: شيويار, also Romanized as Shīvyār; also known as Shīvyār-e Bālā and Shīsūyār) is a village in Charuymaq-e Markazi Rural District, in the Central District of Charuymaq County, East Azerbaijan Province, Iran. At the 2006 census, its population was 126, in 29 families.
