= Kandovan, Sarab =

Kandovan كندوان
- Village
- Location within Iran
- Coordinates: 37°59′34″N 47°33′30″E
- Country: Iran
- Province: East Azerbaijan
- County: Sarab
- Bakhsh: Central
- Rural District: Razliq

Population (2006)
  - Total: 239
- Time zone: UTC+3:30 (IRST)
  - Summer (DST): UTC+4:30 (IRDT)

Kandovan (Persian: كندوان, also Romanized as Kandovān) is a village in Razliq Rural District, in the Central District of Sarab County, East Azerbaijan Province, Iran. At the 2006 census, its population was 239, in 52 families.
