= Mahiabad, South Khorasan =

Mahiabad مهياباد
- Village
- Location within Iran
- Coordinates: 32°59′27″N 59°17′46″E
- Country: Iran
- Province: South Khorasan
- County: Birjand
- Bakhsh: Central
- Rural District: Alqurat

Population (2006)
  - Total: 54
- Time zone: UTC+3:30 (IRST)
  - Summer (DST): UTC+4:30 (IRDT)

Mahiabad (Persian: مهياباد, also Romanized as Mahīābād and Mahyābād; also known as Mayābād) is a village in Alqurat Rural District, in the Central District of Birjand County, South Khorasan Province, Iran. At the 2006 census, its population was 54, in 19 families.
