= Garmeh-ye Shomali Rural District =

Rural district in East Azerbaijan province, Iran

Garmeh-ye Shomali Rural District Persian: دهستان گرمه شمالي
- Rural District
- Location within Iran
- Coordinates: 37°47′N 48°00′E
- Country: Iran
- Province: East Azerbaijan
- County: Mianeh
- District: Kandovan
- Established: 1987
- Capital: Armudaq

Population (2016)
  - Total: 5,446
- Time zone: UTC+3:30 (IRST)

Garmeh-ye Shomali Rural District (Persian: دهستان گرمه شمالي) is in Kandovan District of Mianeh County, East Azerbaijan province, Iran. Its capital is the village of Armudaq.

== Demographics ==
=== Population ===
At the time of the 2006 National Census, the rural district's population was 7,584 in 1,612 households. There were 6,645 inhabitants in 1,945 households at the following census of 2011. The 2016 census measured the population of the rural district as 5,446 in 1,750 households. The most populous of its 32 villages was Armudaq, with 603 people.

=== Other villages in the rural district ===
- Livanlu
- Molk
- Ney Baghi
- Sonqorabad
- Tajaroq
- Tevin
- Tush Manlu
