= Tirchai Rural District =

Rural district in East Azerbaijan province, Iran

Tirchai Rural District Persian: دهستان تيرچائي
- Rural District
- Location within Iran
- Coordinates: 37°37′N 47°36′E
- Country: Iran
- Province: East Azerbaijan
- County: Mianeh
- District: Kandovan
- Established: 1987
- Capital: Ishlaq

Population (2016)
  - Total: 5,797
- Time zone: UTC+3:30 (IRST)

Tirchai Rural District (Persian: دهستان تيرچائي) is in Kandovan District of Mianeh County, East Azerbaijan province, Iran. Its capital is the village of Ishlaq.

== Demographics ==
=== Population ===
At the time of the 2006 National Census, the rural district's population was 6,923 in 1,894 households. There were 6,099 inhabitants in 1,928 households at the following census of 2011. The 2016 census measured the population of the rural district as 5,797 in 1,966 households. The most populous of its 26 villages was Avenliq, with 1,774 people.

=== Other villages in the rural district ===
- Balesin
- Eyvaraq
- Qeshlaq-e Musa Beyg
- Shivyar
