= Kandovan Rural District =

Rural district in East Azerbaijan province, Iran

Kandovan Rural District Persian: دهستان كندوان
- Rural District
- Location within Iran
- Coordinates: 37°40′N 47°48′E
- Country: Iran
- Province: East Azerbaijan
- County: Mianeh
- District: Kandovan
- Established: 1987
- Capital: Tark

Population (2016)
  - Total: 7,857
- Time zone: UTC+3:30 (IRST)

Kandovan Rural District (Persian: دهستان كندوان) is in Kandovan District of Mianeh County, East Azerbaijan province, Iran. It is administered from the city of Tark.

== Demographics ==
=== Population ===
At the time of the 2006 National Census, the rural district's population was 8,444 in 1,913 households. There were 8,487 inhabitants in 2,510 households at the following census of 2011. The 2016 census measured the population of the rural district as 7,857 in 2,579 households. The most populous of its 35 villages was Khanqah, with 827 people.

=== Other villages in the rural district ===
- Avin-e Masjedlu
- Cheshmeh Kesh
- Fandoqlu
- Mahiabad
- Neshaq
