= Kandovan District =

District in East Azerbaijan province, Iran

Kandovan District Persian: بخش کندوان
- District
- Location within Iran
- Coordinates: 37°41′N 47°50′E
- Country: Iran
- Province: East Azerbaijan
- County: Mianeh
- Capital: Tark

Population (2016)
  - Total: 21,131
- Time zone: UTC+3:30 (IRST)

Kandovan District (Persian: بخش کندوان) is in Mianeh County, East Azerbaijan province, Iran. Its capital is the city of Tark.

== Demographics ==
=== Population ===
At the time of the 2006 National Census, the district's population was 24,820 in 5,875 households. The following census in 2011 counted 23,637 people in 6,915 households. The 2016 census measured the population of the district as 21,131 inhabitants in 6,897 households.

=== Administrative divisions ===
Kandovan District Population
Administrative Divisions	2006	2011	2016
Garmeh-ye Shomali RD	7,584	6,645	5,446
Kandovan RD	8,444	8,487	7,857
Tirchai RD	6,923	6,099	5,797
Tark (city)	1,869	2,406	2,031
Total	24,820	23,637	21,131
RD = Rural District
