= Golujeh =

Golujeh or Gollujeh or Galoojeh or Galujeh (Persian: گلوجه) may refer to:

- Golujeh, Khalkhal, Ardabil Province
- Golujeh, Khvoresh Rostam, Ardabil Province
- Golujeh, Nir, Ardabil Province
- Gollujeh, Ahar, East Azerbaijan Province
- Golujeh, Bostanabad, East Azerbaijan Province
- Golujeh, Meyaneh, East Azerbaijan Province
- Gollujeh, Sarab, East Azerbaijan Province
- Golujeh, Tabriz, East Azerbaijan Province
- Golujeh-ye Eslam, East Azerbaijan Province
- Golujeh-ye Ghami, East Azerbaijan Province
- Golujeh-ye Hasan Beyg, East Azerbaijan Province
- Golujeh-ye Khaleseh, East Azerbaijan Province
- Golujeh-ye Mohammad Khan, East Azerbaijan Province
- Golujeh-ye Olya, East Azerbaijan Province
- Golujeh-ye Said, East Azerbaijan Province
- Golujeh, Zanjan
