= Qelij Chi =

Qelij Chi قليج چي
- Village
- Location within Iran
- Coordinates: 37°25′03″N 47°24′39″E
- Country: Iran
- Province: East Azerbaijan
- County: Meyaneh
- Bakhsh: Central
- Rural District: Owch Tappeh-ye Sharqi

Population (2006)
  - Total: 101
- Time zone: UTC+3:30 (IRST)
  - Summer (DST): UTC+4:30 (IRDT)

Qelij Chi (Persian: قليج چي, also Romanized as Qelīj Chī; also known as Qelīch Chī) is a village in Owch Tappeh-ye Sharqi Rural District, in the Central District of Meyaneh County, East Azerbaijan Province, Iran. At the 2006 census, its population was 101, in 19 families.
