= Shami Kandi =

Shami Kandi شمي كندي
- Village
- Location within Iran
- Coordinates: 37°23′00″N 47°28′00″E
- Country: Iran
- Province: East Azerbaijan
- County: Meyaneh
- Bakhsh: Central
- Rural District: Owch Tappeh-ye Sharqi

Population (2006)
  - Total: 32
- Time zone: UTC+3:30 (IRST)
  - Summer (DST): UTC+4:30 (IRDT)

Shami Kandi (Persian: شمي كندي, also Romanized as Sham‘ī Kandī) is a village in Owch Tappeh-ye Sharqi Rural District, in the Central District of Meyaneh County, East Azerbaijan Province, Iran. At the 2006 census, its population was 32, in 7 families.
