= Bonyanabad =

Bonyanabad بنيان اباد
- Village
- Location within Iran
- Coordinates: 37°37′52″N 47°58′42″E
- Country: Iran
- Province: East Azerbaijan
- County: Meyaneh
- Bakhsh: Central
- Rural District: Garmeh-ye Jonubi

Population (2006)
  - Total: 26
- Time zone: UTC+3:30 (IRST)
  - Summer (DST): UTC+4:30 (IRDT)

Bonyanabad (Persian: بنيان اباد, also Romanized as Bonyānābād; also known as Bonyādābād) is a village in Garmeh-ye Jonubi Rural District, in the Central District of Meyaneh County, East Azerbaijan Province, Iran. At the 2006 census, its population was 26, in 6 families.
