= Quyular =

Quyular قويولار
- Village
- Location within Iran
- Coordinates: 37°12′44″N 47°38′36″E
- Country: Iran
- Province: East Azerbaijan
- County: Meyaneh
- Bakhsh: Central
- Rural District: Qezel Uzan

Population (2006)
  - Total: 110
- Time zone: UTC+3:30 (IRST)
  - Summer (DST): UTC+4:30 (IRDT)

Quyular (Persian: قويولار, also Romanized as Qūyūlār; also known as Qūylār) is a village in Qezel Uzan Rural District, in the Central District of Meyaneh County, East Azerbaijan Province, Iran. At the 2006 census, its population was 110, in 18 families.
