= Varduq =

Varduq وردوق
- Village
- Location within Iran
- Coordinates: 37°24′06″N 47°53′27″E
- Country: Iran
- Province: East Azerbaijan
- County: Meyaneh
- Bakhsh: Central
- Rural District: Garmeh-ye Jonubi

Population (2006)
  - Total: 57
- Time zone: UTC+3:30 (IRST)
  - Summer (DST): UTC+4:30 (IRDT)

Varduq (Persian: وردوق, also Romanized as Vardūq, Vardavaq, Vardevaq, and Wardavaq) is a village in Garmeh-ye Jonubi Rural District, in the Central District of Meyaneh County, East Azerbaijan Province, Iran. According to the 2006 census, it had a population of 57, residing in 22 families.
