= Chekhmur =

Chekhmur چخمور
- Village
- Location within Iran
- Coordinates: 37°15′58″N 47°24′03″E
- Country: Iran
- Province: East Azerbaijan
- County: Meyaneh
- Bakhsh: Central
- Rural District: Kolah Boz-e Gharbi

Population (2006)
  - Total: 206
- Time zone: UTC+3:30 (IRST)
  - Summer (DST): UTC+4:30 (IRDT)

Chekhmur (Persian: چخمور, also Romanized as Chekhmūr) is a village in Kolah Boz-e Gharbi Rural District, in the Central District of Meyaneh County, East Azerbaijan Province, Iran. At the 2006 census, its population was 206, in 36 families.
