= Kohban =

Kohban كهبان
- Village
- Location within Iran
- Coordinates: 37°30′36″N 48°03′45″E
- Country: Iran
- Province: East Azerbaijan
- County: Meyaneh
- Bakhsh: Central
- Rural District: Garmeh-ye Jonubi

Population (2006)
  - Total: 774
- Time zone: UTC+3:30 (IRST)
  - Summer (DST): UTC+4:30 (IRDT)

Kohban (Persian: كهبان, also Romanized as Kohbān; also known as Kahbanān and Kamanbān) is a village in Garmeh-ye Jonubi Rural District, in the Central District of Meyaneh County, East Azerbaijan Province, Iran. At the 2006 census, its population was 774, in 173 families.
