= Arbat, Mianeh =

Neighborhood in East Azerbaijan province, Iran

Arbat Persian: ارباط
- Neighborhood
- Location within Iran
- Coordinates: 37°25′35″N 47°46′59″E
- County: Iran
- Province: East Azerbaijan
- County: Mianeh
- District: Central
- Rural District: Qaflankuh-e Gharbi
- Village: Sabz-e Arbat

Population (2016)
  - Total: 1,322
- Time zone: UTC+3:30 (IRST)

Arbat (Persian: ارباط) (Note: Also romanized as Arbāţ) is a neighborhood in the village of Sabz-e Arbat in Qaflankuh-e Gharbi Rural District of the Central District in Mianeh County, East Azerbaijan province, Iran.

== Demographics ==
=== Population ===
At the time of the 2006 National Census, Arbat's population was 1,744 in 417 households, when it was a village in Qaflankuh-e Gharbi Rural District. The following census in 2011 counted 1,764 people in 523 households. The 2016 census measured the population of the village as 1,322 people in 420 households.

The village of Sabz merged with Arbat to become the village of Sabz-e Arbat in 2021.
