= Ajami-ye Kallehbuz =

Ajami-ye Kallehbuz عجمي كله بوز
- Village
- Location within Iran
- Coordinates: 37°15′51″N 47°21′51″E
- Country: Iran
- Province: East Azerbaijan
- County: Meyaneh
- Bakhsh: Central
- Rural District: Kolah Boz-e Gharbi

Population (2006)
  - Total: 290
- Time zone: UTC+3:30 (IRST)
  - Summer (DST): UTC+4:30 (IRDT)

Ajami-ye Kallehbuz (Persian: عجمي كله بوز, also Romanized as ‘Ajamī-ye Kallehbūz and Ajamī Kolahbūz; also known as Kallehbūz ‘Ajamī and Kalleh Būz-e ‘Ajamī) is a village in Kolah Boz-e Gharbi Rural District, in the Central District of Meyaneh County, East Azerbaijan Province, Iran. At the 2006 census, its population was 290, in 47 families.
