= Davah Dashi =

Coordinates: 37°38′14″N 47°59′02″E

Davah Dashi دوه داشي
- Village
- Interactive map of Davah Dashi
- Country: Iran
- Province: East Azerbaijan
- County: Meyaneh
- Bakhsh: Central
- Rural District: Garmeh-ye Jonubi

Population (2006)
  - Total: 210
- Time zone: UTC+3:30 (IRST)
  - Summer (DST): UTC+4:30 (IRDT)

Davah Dashi (Persian: دوه داشي, also Romanized as Davah Dāshī) is a village in Garmeh-ye Jonubi Rural District, in the Central District of Meyaneh County, East Azerbaijan Province, Iran. At the 2006 census, its population was 210, in 34 families.
