= Dul Qeshlaqi =

Dul Qeshlaqi دول قشلاقي
- Village
- Location within Iran
- Coordinates: 37°30′48″N 48°01′27″E
- Country: Iran
- Province: East Azerbaijan
- County: Meyaneh
- Bakhsh: Central
- Rural District: Garmeh-ye Jonubi

Population (2006)
  - Total: 71
- Time zone: UTC+3:30 (IRST)
  - Summer (DST): UTC+4:30 (IRDT)

Dul Qeshlaqi (Persian: دول قشلاقي, also Romanized as Dūl Qeshlāqī) is a village in Garmeh-ye Jonubi Rural District, in the Central District of Meyaneh County, East Azerbaijan Province, Iran. At the 2006 census, its population was 71, in 16 families.
