= Agh Tavaraq =

Agh Tavaraq اغ طورق
- Village
- Location within Iran
- Coordinates: 37°18′53″N 47°22′12″E
- Country: Iran
- Province: East Azerbaijan
- County: Meyaneh
- Bakhsh: Central
- Rural District: Kolah Boz-e Gharbi

Population (2006)
  - Total: 147
- Time zone: UTC+3:30 (IRST)
  - Summer (DST): UTC+4:30 (IRDT)

Agh Tavaraq (Persian: اغ طورق, also Romanized as Āgh Ţavaraq; also known as Āq Ţavaraq) is a village in Kolah Boz-e Gharbi Rural District, in the Central District of Meyaneh County, East Azerbaijan Province, Iran. At the 2006 census, its population was 147, in 25 families.
