= Agh Darak =

Agh Darak اغدرك
- Village
- Location within Iran
- Coordinates: 37°16′47″N 47°27′23″E
- Country: Iran
- Province: East Azerbaijan
- County: Meyaneh
- Bakhsh: Central
- Rural District: Kolah Boz-e Gharbi

Population (2006)
  - Total: 86
- Time zone: UTC+3:30 (IRST)
  - Summer (DST): UTC+4:30 (IRDT)

Agh Darak (Persian: اغدرك, also Romanized as Āgh Darak and Āq Darak) is a village in Kolah Boz-e Gharbi Rural District, in the Central District of Meyaneh County, East Azerbaijan Province, Iran. At the 2006 census, its population was 86, in 18 families.
