= Bodagh Beyg =

Bodagh Beyg بداغ بيگ
- Village
- Location within Iran
- Coordinates: 37°14′26″N 47°30′06″E
- Country: Iran
- Province: East Azerbaijan
- County: Meyaneh
- Bakhsh: Central
- Rural District: Kolah Boz-e Sharqi

Population (2006)
  - Total: 232
- Time zone: UTC+3:30 (IRST)
  - Summer (DST): UTC+4:30 (IRDT)

Bodagh Beyg (Persian: بداغ بيگ, also Romanized as Bodāgh Beyg; also known as Bodāq Beyg) is a village in Kolah Boz-e Sharqi Rural District, in the Central District of Meyaneh County, East Azerbaijan Province, Iran. At the 2006 census, its population was 232, in 46 families.
