= Qahremanlu =

Qahremanlu قهرمانلو
- Village
- Location within Iran
- Coordinates: 37°24′55″N 47°25′51″E
- Country: Iran
- Province: East Azerbaijan
- County: Meyaneh
- Bakhsh: Central
- Rural District: Owch Tappeh-ye Sharqi

Population (2006)
  - Total: 68
- Time zone: UTC+3:30 (IRST)
  - Summer (DST): UTC+4:30 (IRDT)

Qahremanlu (Persian: قهرمانلو, also Romanized as Qahremānlū) is a village in Owch Tappeh-ye Sharqi Rural District, in the Central District of Meyaneh County, East Azerbaijan Province, Iran. At the 2006 census, its population was 68, in 14 families.
