= Zardeh Malek =

Zardeh Malek زرده ملك
- Village
- Location within Iran
- Coordinates: 37°15′41″N 47°34′06″E
- Country: Iran
- Province: East Azerbaijan
- County: Meyaneh
- Bakhsh: Central
- Rural District: Kolah Boz-e Sharqi

Population (2006)
  - Total: 112
- Time zone: UTC+3:30 (IRST)
  - Summer (DST): UTC+4:30 (IRDT)

Zardeh Malek (Persian: زرده ملك) is a village in Kolah Boz-e Sharqi Rural District, in the Central District of Meyaneh County, East Azerbaijan Province, Iran. At the 2006 census, its population was 112, in 30 families.
