= Sheykhlu =

Sheykhlu or Shekhlow or Shekhlu (Persian: شيخ لو) may refer to various places in Iran:

- Sheykhlu, Ardabil
- Sheykhlu, East Azerbaijan
- Sheykhlu, Razavi Khorasan
- Sheykhlu, Zanjan

== See also ==
- Sheykhlar (disambiguation), various places in Iran
