= Qarah Owri =

Qarah Owri قره اوري
- Village
- Location within Iran
- Coordinates: 37°15′52″N 47°46′19″E
- Country: Iran
- Province: East Azerbaijan
- County: Meyaneh
- Bakhsh: Central
- Rural District: Qezel Uzan

Population (2006)
  - Total: 235
- Time zone: UTC+3:30 (IRST)
  - Summer (DST): UTC+4:30 (IRDT)

Qarah Owri (Persian: قره اوري, also Romanized as Qarah Owrī; also known as Qareh Āvar) is a village in Qezel Uzan Rural District, in the Central District of Meyaneh County, East Azerbaijan Province, Iran. At the 2006 census, its population was 235, in 56 families.
