= Allah Dad =

Allah Dad (Persian: الله داد or اله داد) may refer to:

- Allah Dad, East Azerbaijan
- Allah Dad, Sistan and Baluchestan
- Allah Dad, Chabahar, Sistan and Baluchestan Province
