= Khalifeh Kamal =

Khalifeh Kamal خليفه كمال
- Village
- Location within Iran
- Coordinates: 37°17′14″N 47°18′46″E
- Country: Iran
- Province: East Azerbaijan
- County: Meyaneh
- Bakhsh: Central
- Rural District: Kolah Boz-e Gharbi

Population (2006)
  - Total: 28
- Time zone: UTC+3:30 (IRST)
  - Summer (DST): UTC+4:30 (IRDT)

Khalifeh Kamal (Persian: خليفه كمال, also Romanized as Khalīfeh Kamāl) is a village in Kolah Boz-e Gharbi Rural District, in the Central District of Meyaneh County, East Azerbaijan Province, Iran. At the 2006 census, its population was 28, in 4 families.
