= Diz Gavin =

Diz Gavin ديزگوين
- Village
- Location within Iran
- Coordinates: 37°24′06″N 47°50′50″E
- Country: Iran
- Province: East Azerbaijan
- County: Meyaneh
- Bakhsh: Central
- Rural District: Qaflankuh-e Gharbi

Population (2006)
  - Total: 82
- Time zone: UTC+3:30 (IRST)
  - Summer (DST): UTC+4:30 (IRDT)

Diz Gavin (Persian: ديزگوين, also Romanized as Dīz Gavīn and Dīzgavīn) is a village in Qaflankuh-e Gharbi Rural District, in the Central District of Meyaneh County, East Azerbaijan Province, Iran. In the 2006 census, its population was 82 people in 22 families.
