= Hassan Sayyad Khodaei =

Iranian military officer (1972–2022)

Colonel Hassan Sayyad Khodaei
- Native name: حسن صیاد خدایی
- Nickname: Hassan Khodaei
- Born: 1972; Bashmaq, Iran
- Died: 22 May 2022 (aged 49–50) Tehran, Iran
- Cause of death: Gunshot wounds
- Allegiance: Iran
- Branch: Revolutionary Guards; Quds Force Unit 840
- Service years: 1987–2022
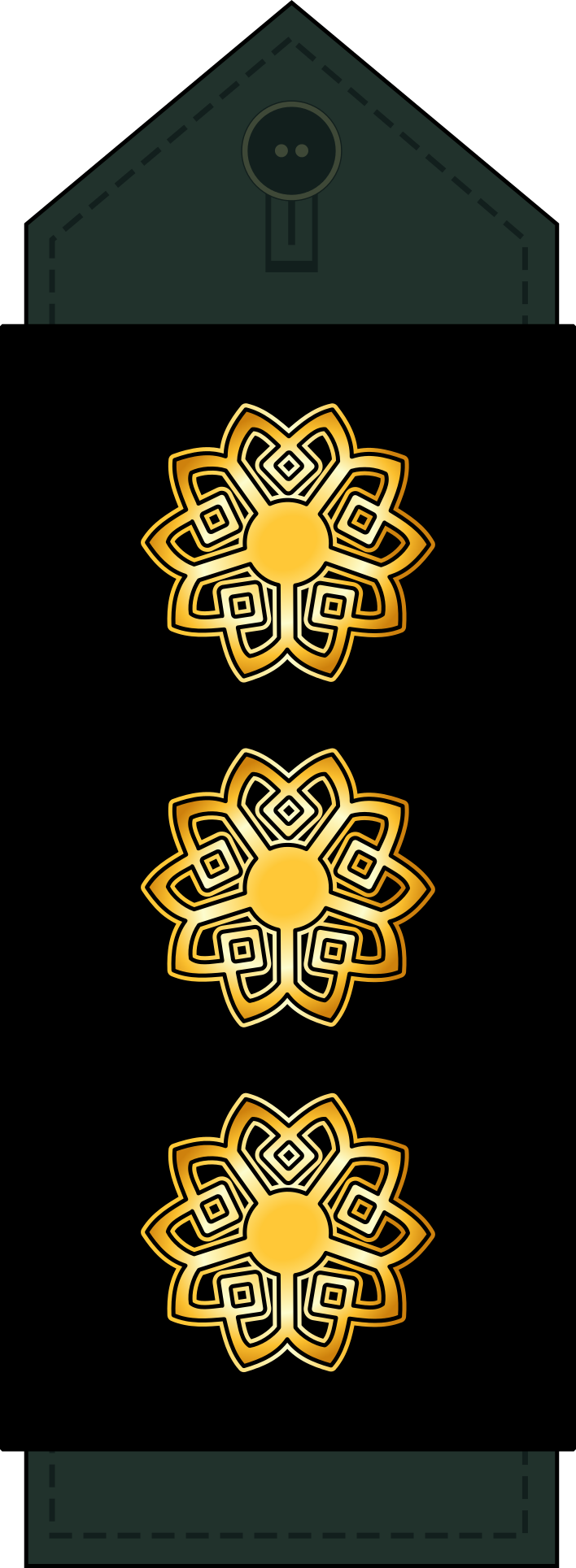
- Rank: Colonel

Hassan Sayyad Khodaei (Persian: حسن صیاد خدایی, 1972 – May 22, 2022) was an Iranian military officer who served in the Islamic Revolutionary Guard Corps (IRGC). He was reportedly the deputy commander of Unit 840, a clandestine division tasked with orchestrating assassinations, kidnappings, and other covert activities targeting Iranian dissidents, Israeli interests, and Western figures across various regions, including the Middle East, Europe, and Latin America.

Serving as a Holy Shrine Defender, he was assassinated on 22 May 2022 by motorcycle-riding gunmen in front of his home. Iran has blamed the assassination on "global arrogance," a term used to refer to the United States and its allies, such as Israel. According to the Wall Street Journal, the New York Times and other sources citing people familiar with the matter, Khodaei planned kidnappings and killings for an arm of the IRGC known as Quds Force Unit 840, including failed plots to kill an Israeli diplomat, an American general and a French intellectual.

== Background ==
Hassan Sayyad Khodaei was born in 1972 in the Bashmaq, a village in Kolah Boz-e Gharbi Rural District, in the Central District of Mianeh County, East Azerbaijan Province. Sayyad Khodaei joined the Revolutionary Guard (IRGC) in 1987. Later, he was active as a Holy Shrine Defender (Persian: مدافعان حرم, romanized: Modāfe'ān-e-Haram). This phrase refers to those who fight against ISIS in Syria and Iraq as part of the Quds Force, responsible for extraterritorial operations. Iranian scientists and academics have been killed or attacked by explosions, bombs, or motorcycle-riding shooters since 2010. Israel has a history of assassinating nuclear scientists inside Iran in the same style. On 27 November 2020, the Israeli government, with knowledge and support from the US government assassinated a top nuclear scientist Mohsen Fakhrizadeh.

== Assassination ==
On the afternoon of 22 May 2022, Khodaei was returning home in the south of Tehran when he was fatally shot five times by motorcycle-riding gunmen in his car outside his home at around 4 pm (11:30 GMT). There has been no claim of responsibility for the assassination, but according to The Guardian the assassination style increases the chance of being linked to a series of previous motorcycle killings in Iran imputed to Israel, such as during the assassinations of Iranian nuclear scientists. In December 2023, former Israeli prime minister Naftali Bennett confirmed the Mossad executed him.

=== Reactions ===
Ranks of the Islamic Revolutionary Guard Corps (IRGC)
Forces
Ground forces, Aerospace and Quds	Navy
Colonel General Pasdar	Admiral Pasdar
Lieutenant General Pasdar	Vice Admiral Pasdar
Major General Pasdar	Rear Admiral Pasdar
Brigadier General Pasdar	Commodore Pasdar
Second Brigadier General Pasdar	Second Brigadier Admiral
Colonel Pasdar	Captain Pasdar
Lieutenant colonel Pasdar	Frigate Captain Pasdar
Major Pasdar	Lieutenant Commander Pasdar
Captain Pasdar	Captain Lieutenant Pasdar
Lieutenant Pasdar	Lieutenant Pasdar
Second Lieutenant Pasdar	Second Lieutenant Pasdar
Junior Lieutenant Pasdar	Junior Lieutenant Pasdar
Sergeant Major Pasdar	Warrant Officer Pasdar
Second Sergeant Major Pasdar	Michman Pasdar
Sergeant Pasdar	Petty Officer Pasdar
Second Sergeant Pasdar	Second Petty Officer Pasdar
Junior Sergeant Pasdar	Junior Petty Officer Pasdar
Corporal Pasdar	Able Seaman Pasdar
Soldier Pasdar	Seaman Pasdar
Note: The forces of the Islamic Revolutionary Guard Corps are called "Pasdar". "Pasdar" is a Persian word meaning "Guardian" or "Watchman".

On 23 May 2022, Ebrahim Raisi, president of Iran, promised to avenge the assassination. He described Khodaei as a martyr and blamed global arrogance for his assassination.

Hossein Salami, the commander-in-chief of the IRGC, vowed a strong response and “revenge against the enemies” responsible.

On 25 May 2022, Iran called on the international community to condemn such "cruel" assassinations that target other countries' innocent citizens.

The New York Times reported that Israel had informed US officials about its role in assassination of a senior member of IRGC. Israel reportedly claimed the assassination was an attempt to warn Iran about the continuation of the operation of an alleged secret unit where Khodaei was a member. According to Ynet, Israel was outraged by the leak, and Israeli officials told Ynet that they were asking their American counterparts for a response since the New York Times report had blamed only Israel for the killings without mentioning the U.S. involvement. Israel claimed Khodaei was the deputy head of an alleged secret unit known as 840 in the Quds Force that carried out kidnappings and assassinations of figures outside Iran, mostly against Israelis. Israel referred to the confessions of an Iranian farmer named Mansour Rasouli who, according to Israel, confessed to plotting attacks against American and Israeli figures. Rasouli rejected any involvement in the operation. Later he said that he was kidnapped by Mossad and threatened to be killed along with his family and that he was forced to confess under torture.

On June 3, Ali Esmailzadeh, another colonel of the Quds Force, died after falling from a roof in a supposed accident. An Iranian opposition source claimed he was killed by the IRGC over suspicions he leaked information that led to the assassination of Khodaei.

On 30 April 2025, Mohsen Langarneshin, a 34-year old inmate of Ghezel Hesar prison in Karaj, was hanged over the murder and on charges of spying for Israel. Iranian authorities claimed that Langarneshin had been a Mossad agent since 2020 and had provided "technical support" to Khodaei's assassins. His family and human rights advocates disputed his role, saying that he had confessed under torture and did not receive a fair trial.

== See also ==
- 2020 Iran explosions
- Assassination of Iranian nuclear scientists
- Assassination and terrorism in Iran
- Iran and weapons of mass destruction
- Iran–Israel proxy conflict
- Israel and state-sponsored terrorism
- Dariush Rezaeinejad
- Unit 840
