= Qalujeh =

Qalujeh (Persian: قالوجه) may refer to several places in Iran:

- Qalujeh, East Azerbaijan
- Qalujeh, Kurdistan

== See also ==
- Qarlujeh, East Azerbaijan
