= Qasem Daraq =

Village in East Azerbaijan province, Iran

Qasem Daraq Persian: قاسم درق
- Village
- Location within Iran
- Coordinates: 37°26′20″N 47°34′03″E
- Country: Iran
- Province: East Azerbaijan
- County: Mianeh
- District: Central
- Rural District: Owch Tappeh-ye Sharqi

Population (2016)
  - Total: 223
- Time zone: UTC+3:30 (IRST)

Qasem Daraq (Persian: قاسم درق) (Note: Also romanized as Qāsem Daraq) is a village in Owch Tappeh-ye Sharqi Rural District of the Central District in Mianeh County, East Azerbaijan province, Iran.

== Demographics ==
=== Population ===
At the time of the 2006 National Census, the village's population was 242 in 39 households. The following census in 2011 counted 258 people in 59 households. The 2016 census measured the population of the village as 223 people in 60 households.
