= Baranliq-e Madad Khan =

Baranliq-e Madad Khan برنليق مددخان
- Village
- Location within Iran
- Coordinates: 37°31′53″N 47°46′56″E
- Country: Iran
- Province: East Azerbaijan
- County: Meyaneh
- Bakhsh: Central
- Rural District: Garmeh-ye Jonubi

Population (2006)
  - Total: 294
- Time zone: UTC+3:30 (IRST)
  - Summer (DST): UTC+4:30 (IRDT)

Baranliq-e Madad Khan (Persian: برنليق مددخان, also Romanized as Baranlīq-e Madad Khān; also known as Baranlaq-e Madad Khān and Baranlīq-e Soflá) is a village in Garmeh-ye Jonubi Rural District, in the Central District of Meyaneh County, East Azerbaijan Province, Iran. At the 2006 census, its population was 294, in 70 families.
