= Kamarkuh =

Village in East Azerbaijan province, Iran

Kamarkuh Persian: كمركوه
- Village
- Country: Iran
- Province: East Azerbaijan
- County: Mianeh
- District: Central
- Rural District: Kolah Boz-e Sharqi

Population (2016)
  - Total: 359
- Time zone: UTC+3:30 (IRST)

Kamarkuh (Persian: كمركوه) (Note: Also romanized as Kamarkūh) is a village in Kolah Boz-e Sharqi Rural District of the Central District in Mianeh County, East Azerbaijan province, Iran.

== Demographics ==
=== Population ===
At the time of the 2006 National Census, the village's population was 337 in 67 households. The following census in 2011 counted 303 people in 57 households. The 2016 census measured the population of the village as 359 people in 80 households.
