= Maman, East Azerbaijan =

Village in East Azerbaijan province, Iran

Maman Persian: ممان
- Village
- Location within Iran
- Coordinates: 37°27′48″N 47°54′00″E
- Country: Iran
- Province: East Azerbaijan
- County: Mianeh
- District: Central
- Rural District: Garmeh-ye Jonubi

Population (2016)
  - Total: 372
- Time zone: UTC+3:30 (IRST)

Maman (Persian: ممان) (Note: Also romanized as Mamān and Māmān; also known as Mamanlu) is a village in Garmeh-ye Jonubi Rural District of the Central District in Mianeh County, East Azerbaijan province, Iran.

== Demographics ==
=== Population ===
At the time of the 2006 National Census, the village's population was 889 in 280 households. The following census in 2011 counted 592 people in 200 households. The 2016 census measured the population of the village as 372 people in 135 households.
