= Agh Qeshlaq, Meyaneh =

Agh Qeshlaq اغ قشلاق
- Village
- Location within Iran
- Coordinates: 37°19′12″N 47°47′06″E
- Country: Iran
- Province: East Azerbaijan
- County: Meyaneh
- Bakhsh: Central
- Rural District: Qaflankuh-e Gharbi

Population (2006)
  - Total: 19
- Time zone: UTC+3:30 (IRST)
  - Summer (DST): UTC+4:30 (IRDT)

Agh Qeshlaq (Persian: اغ قشلاق, also Romanized as Āgh Qeshlāq; also known as Āghcheh Qeshlāq) is a village in Qaflankuh-e Gharbi Rural District, in the Central District of Meyaneh County, East Azerbaijan Province, Iran. At the 2006 census, its population was 19, in 7 families.
