= Darin Daraq =

Village in East Azerbaijan province, Iran

Darin Daraq Persian: دريندرق
- Village
- Location within Iran
- Coordinates: 37°19′12″N 47°32′58″E
- Country: Iran
- Province: East Azerbaijan
- County: Mianeh
- District: Central
- Rural District: Kolah Boz-e Gharbi

Population (2016)
  - Total: 649
- Time zone: UTC+3:30 (IRST)

Darin Daraq (Persian: دريندرق) (Note: Also romanized as Darīn Daraq and Darīndaraq) is a village in Kolah Boz-e Gharbi Rural District of the Central District in Mianeh County, East Azerbaijan province, Iran.

== Demographics ==
=== Population ===
At the time of the 2006 National Census, the village's population was 701 in 136 households. The following census in 2011 counted 626 people in 178 households. The 2016 census measured the population of the village as 649 people in 197 households.
