= Baranliq =

Baranliq (Persian: برنليق), also rendered as Baranlaq, may refer to:

- Baranliq-e Hoseyn Khan
- Baranliq-e Madad Khan
