= Gun Dughdi =

Gun Dughdi or Gundughdi or Goondooghdi (Persian: گوندوغدي) may refer to:

- Gun Dughdi, Bostanabad
- Gundughdi, Mianeh
