= Khanlu =

Khanlu (Persian: خانلو) may refer to:

- Khanlu, East Azerbaijan
- Khanlu, Zanjan
