= Eslamabad, Mianeh =

Village in East Azerbaijan province, Iran

Eslamabad Persian: اسلام اباد
- Village
- Location within Iran
- Coordinates: 37°23′03″N 47°44′23″E
- County: Iran
- Province: East Azerbaijan
- County: Mianeh
- District: Central
- Rural District: Qaflankuh-e Gharbi

Population (2016)
  - Total: 2,281
- Time zone: UTC+3:30 (IRST)

Eslamabad (Persian: اسلام اباد) (Note: Also romanized as Eslāmābād) is a village in Qaflankuh-e Gharbi Rural District of the Central District in Mianeh County, East Azerbaijan province, Iran.

== Demographics ==
=== Population ===
At the time of the 2006 National Census, the village's population was 1,842 in 408 households. The following census in 2011 counted 2,327 people in 632 households. The 2016 census measured the population of the village as 2,281 people in 662 households. It was the most populous village in its rural district.
