= Duzanan =

Village in East Azerbaijan province, Iran

Duzanan Persian: دوزنان
- Village
- Location within Iran
- Coordinates: 37°20′38″N 47°29′59″E
- Country: Iran
- Province: East Azerbaijan
- County: Mianeh
- District: Central
- Rural District: Kolah Boz-e Gharbi

Population (2016)
  - Total: 243
- Time zone: UTC+3:30 (IRST)

Duzanan (Persian: دوزنان) (Note: Also romanized as Dūzanān) is a village in Kolah Boz-e Gharbi Rural District of the Central District in Mianeh County, East Azerbaijan province, Iran.

== Demographics ==
=== Population ===
At the time of the 2006 National Census, the village's population was 284 in 67 households. The following census in 2011 counted 282 people in 84 households. The 2016 census measured the population of the village as 243 people in 76 households.
