= Akramabad, East Azerbaijan =

Village in East Azerbaijan province, Iran

Akramabad Persian: اكرم اباد
- Village
- Location within Iran
- Coordinates: 37°16′53″N 47°36′01″E
- Country: Iran
- Province: East Azerbaijan
- County: Mianeh
- District: Central
- Rural District: Kolah Boz-e Sharqi

Population (2016)
  - Total: 270
- Time zone: UTC+3:30 (IRST)

Akramabad (Persian: اكرم اباد) (Note: Also romanized as Akramābād; also known as Karīm Ābād and Ūrlūlī) is a village in Kolah Boz-e Sharqi Rural District of the Central District in Mianeh County, East Azerbaijan province, Iran.

== Demographics ==
=== Population ===
At the time of the 2006 National Census, the village's population was 334 in 58 households. The following census in 2011 counted 287 people in 71 households. The 2016 census measured the population of the village as 270 people in 72 households.
