= Bulanliq =

Village in East Azerbaijan province, Iran

Bulanliq Persian: بولانليق
- Village
- Location within Iran
- Coordinates: 37°10′51″N 47°40′04″E
- Country: Iran
- Province: East Azerbaijan
- County: Mianeh
- District: Central
- Rural District: Qezel Uzan

Population (2016)
  - Total: 304
- Time zone: UTC+3:30 (IRST)

Bulanliq (Persian: بولانليق) (Note: Also romanized as Būlānlīq; also known as Bolānlīq) is a village in Qezel Uzan Rural District of the Central District in Mianeh County, East Azerbaijan province, Iran.

== Demographics ==
=== Population ===
At the time of the 2006 National Census, the village's population was 456 in 84 households. The following census in 2011 counted 384 people in 100 households. The 2016 census measured the population of the village as 304 people in 90 households.
