= Sheykhdarabad =

Village in East Azerbaijan province, Iran

Sheykhdarabad Persian: شيخدر اباد
- Village
- Location within Iran
- Coordinates: 37°21′54″N 47°36′17″E
- Country: Iran
- Province: East Azerbaijan
- County: Mianeh
- District: Central
- Rural District: Sheykhdarabad

Population (2016)
  - Total: 1,681
- Time zone: UTC+3:30 (IRST)

Sheykhdarabad (Persian: شيخدراباد) (Note: Also romanized as Sheykhdarābād) is a village in, and the capital of, Sheykhdarabad Rural District in the Central District of Mianeh County, East Azerbaijan province, Iran.

== Demographics ==
=== Population ===
At the time of the 2006 National Census, the village's population was 2,154 in 451 households. The following census in 2011 counted 2,079 people in 587 households. The 2016 census measured the population of the village as 1,681 people in 505 households. It was the most populous village in its rural district.
