= Hasanabad, Mianeh =

Village in East Azerbaijan province, Iran

Galangedar گلنگدر
- Village
- Hasanabad
- Location within Iran
- Coordinates: 37°24′49″N 47°45′19″E
- County: Iran
- Province: East Azerbaijan
- County: Mianeh
- District: Central
- Rural District: Qaflankuh-e Gharbi

Population (2016)
  - Total: 1,088
- Time zone: UTC+3:30 (IRST)

Galangedar, officially known as Hasanabad (Persian: حسن اباد; South Azerbaijani: گلنگدر, romanized: Galen Gadar) (Note: Also romanized as Ḩasanābād; also known as Galan Gadar and Galangadar (گلنگدر)) is a village in Qaflankuh-e Gharbi Rural District of the Central District in Mianeh County, East Azerbaijan province, Iran.

== Demographics ==
=== Population ===
At the time of the 2006 National Census, the village's population was 1,338 in 293 households. The following census in 2011 counted 1,196 people in 347 households. The 2016 census measured the population of the village as 1,088 people in 329 households.
