= Hallaj, Iran =

Hallaj (Persian: حلاج) in Iran may refer to:

- Hallaj-e Olya
- Hallaj-e Sofla
