= Galbus =

Village in East Azerbaijan province, Iran

Galbus Persian: گلبوس
- Village
- Location within Iran
- Coordinates: 37°22′10″N 47°42′30″E
- Country: Iran
- Province: East Azerbaijan
- County: Mianeh
- District: Central
- Rural District: Kolah Boz-e Sharqi

Population (2016)
  - Total: 210
- Time zone: UTC+3:30 (IRST)

Galbus (Persian: گلبوس) (Note: Also romanized as Galbūs, Golboos, and Golbūs) is a village in Kolah Boz-e Sharqi Rural District of the Central District in Mianeh County, East Azerbaijan province, Iran.

== Demographics ==
=== Population ===
At the time of the 2006 National Census, the village's population was 388 in 79 households. The following census in 2011 counted 300 people in 74 households. The 2016 census measured the population of the village as 210 people in 59 households.
