= Chetab =

Chetab (Persian: چتاب) may refer to:

- Chetab-e Olya
- Chetab-e Sofla
