= Golujeh-ye Eslam =

Golujeh-ye Eslam گلوجه اسلام
- Village
- Location within Iran
- Coordinates: 37°27′59″N 47°33′04″E
- Country: Iran
- Province: East Azerbaijan
- County: Meyaneh
- Bakhsh: Central
- Rural District: Owch Tappeh-ye Sharqi

Population (2006)
  - Total: 113
- Time zone: UTC+3:30 (IRST)
  - Summer (DST): UTC+4:30 (IRDT)

Golujeh-ye Eslam (Persian: گلوجه اسلام, also Romanized as Golūjeh-ye Eslām) is a village in Owch Tappeh-ye Sharqi Rural District, in the Central District of Meyaneh County, East Azerbaijan Province, Iran. At the 2006 census, its population was 113, in 24 families.
