= Nalbandan =

Village in Zanjan province, Iran

Nalbandan Persian: نعلبندان
- Village
- Location within Iran
- Coordinates: 36°07′52″N 48°40′00″E
- Country: Iran
- Province: Zanjan
- County: Khodabandeh
- District: Do Tappeh
- Rural District: Tup Qarah

Population (2016)
  - Total: 1,088
- Time zone: UTC+3:30 (IRST)

Nalbandan (Persian: نعلبندان) (Note: Also romanized as Na‘lbandān; also known as Qulwīs) is a village in Tup Qarah Rural District of Do Tappeh District in Khodabandeh County, Zanjan province, Iran.

== Demographics ==
=== Population ===
At the time of the 2006 National Census, the village's population was 992 in 212 households, when it was in Howmeh Rural District of the Central District. The following census in 2011 counted 1,149 people in 320 households. The 2016 census measured the population of the village as 1,088 people in 317 households.

In 2020, the rural district was separated from the district in the formation of Do Tappeh District and Nalbandan was transferred to Tup Qarah Rural District created in the new district.
