= Chetab-e Sofla =

Chetab-e Sofla چتاب سفلي
- Village
- Location within Iran
- Coordinates: 37°30′39″N 47°50′30″E
- Country: Iran
- Province: East Azerbaijan
- County: Meyaneh
- Bakhsh: Central
- Rural District: Garmeh-ye Jonubi

Population (2006)
  - Total: 175
- Time zone: UTC+3:30 (IRST)
  - Summer (DST): UTC+4:30 (IRDT)

Chetab-e Sofla (Persian: چتاب سفلي, also Romanized as Chetāb-e Soflá; also known as Chetāb-e Āqākarīm and Chetāb-e Āqā Karīm) is a village in Garmeh-ye Jonubi Rural District, in the Central District of Meyaneh County, East Azerbaijan Province, Iran. At the 2006 census, its population was 175, in 43 families.
