= Parchin, Zanjan =

Village in Zanjan province, Iran

Parchin Persian: پرچین
- Village
- Location within Iran
- Coordinates: 36°03′25″N 48°50′12″E
- Country: Iran
- Province: Zanjan
- County: Khodabandeh
- District: Do Tappeh
- Rural District: Tup Qarah

Population (2016)
  - Total: 367
- Time zone: UTC+3:30 (IRST)

Parchin (Persian: پرچين) (Note: Also romanized as Parchīn; also known as Barchīn) is a village in Tup Qarah Rural District of Do Tappeh District in Khodabandeh County, Zanjan province, Iran.

== Demographics ==
=== Population ===
At the time of the 2006 National Census, the village's population was 834 in 158 households, when it was in Howmeh Rural District of the Central District. The following census in 2011 counted 647 people in 172 households. The 2016 census measured the population of the village as 367 people in 118 households.

In 2020, the rural district was separated from the district in the formation of Do Tappeh District and Parchin was transferred to Tup Qarah Rural District created in the new district.
