= Cherkinlu =

Village in East Azerbaijan province, Iran

Cherkinlu Persian: چركينلو
- Village
- Location within Iran
- Coordinates: 37°33′57″N 47°52′01″E
- Country: Iran
- Province: East Azerbaijan
- County: Mianeh
- District: Central
- Rural District: Garmeh-ye Jonubi

Population (2016)
  - Total: 415
- Time zone: UTC+3:30 (IRST)

Cherkinlu (Persian: چركينلو) (Note: Also romanized as Cherkīnlū; also known as Cherkenlū) is a village in Garmeh-ye Jonubi Rural District of the Central District in Mianeh County, East Azerbaijan province, Iran.

== Demographics ==
=== Population ===
At the time of the 2006 National Census, the village's population was 494 in 117 households. The following census in 2011 counted 449 people in 115 households. The 2016 census measured the population of the village as 415 people in 137 households.
