= Deh Shir, Zanjan =

Village in Zanjan province, Iran

Deh Shir Persian: ده شير
- Village
- Location within Iran
- Coordinates: 36°05′11″N 48°49′51″E
- Country: Iran
- Province: Zanjan
- County: Khodabandeh
- District: Do Tappeh
- Rural District: Tup Qarah

Population (2016)
  - Total: 555
- Time zone: UTC+3:30 (IRST)

Deh Shir (Persian: ده شير) (Note: Also romanized as Deh Shīr and Deh-i-Shīr; also known as Dekh-Shir and Deshīr) is a village in Tup Qarah Rural District of Do Tappeh District in Khodabandeh County, Zanjan province, Iran.

== Demographics ==
=== Population ===
At the time of the 2006 National Census, the village's population was 618 in 130 households, when it was in Howmeh Rural District of the Central District. The following census in 2011 counted 620 people in 176 households. The 2016 census measured the population of the village as 555 people in 161 households.

In 2020, the rural district was separated from the district in the formation of Do Tappeh District and Deh Shir was transferred to Tup Qarah Rural District created in the new district.
