= Qavaq-e Sofla, East Azerbaijan =

Qavaq-e Sofla قواق سفلي
- Village
- Location within Iran
- Coordinates: 37°15′33″N 47°27′29″E
- Country: Iran
- Province: East Azerbaijan
- County: Meyaneh
- Bakhsh: Central
- Rural District: Kolah Boz-e Gharbi

Population (2006)
  - Total: 180
- Time zone: UTC+3:30 (IRST)
  - Summer (DST): UTC+4:30 (IRDT)

Qavaq-e Sofla (Persian: قواق سفلي, also Romanized as Qavāq-e Soflá; also known as Qarāq-e Pā’īn) is a village in Kolah Boz-e Gharbi Rural District, in the Central District of Meyaneh County, East Azerbaijan Province, Iran. At the 2006 census, its population was 180, in 32 families.
