= Siah Kamar, East Azerbaijan =

Village in East Azerbaijan province, Iran

Siah Kamar Persian: سياه كمر
- Village
- Location within Iran
- Coordinates: 37°25′16″N 47°37′41″E
- Country: Iran
- Province: East Azerbaijan
- County: Mianeh
- District: Central
- Rural District: Owch Tappeh-ye Sharqi

Population (2016)
  - Total: 116
- Time zone: UTC+3:30 (IRST)

Siah Kamar (Persian: سياه كمر) (Note: Also romanized as Seyah Kamar and Siyah Kamar) is a village in Owch Tappeh-ye Sharqi Rural District of the Central District in Mianeh County, East Azerbaijan province, Iran.

== Demographics ==
=== Population ===
At the time of the 2006 National Census, the village's population was 150 in 29 households. The following census in 2011 counted 68 people in 19 households. The 2016 census measured the population of the village as 116 people in 32 households.
