= Tavaq =

Village in East Azerbaijan province, Iran

Tavaq Persian: طوق
- Village
- Location within Iran
- Coordinates: 37°12′49″N 47°26′24″E
- Country: Iran
- Province: East Azerbaijan
- County: Mianeh
- District: Central
- Rural District: Kolah Boz-e Sharqi

Population (2016)
  - Total: 1,961
- Time zone: UTC+3:30 (IRST)

Tavaq (Persian: طوق) (Note: Also romanized as Ţavaq) is a village in Kolah Boz-e Sharqi Rural District of the Central District in Mianeh County, East Azerbaijan province, Iran.

== Demographics ==
=== Population ===
At the time of the 2006 National Census, the village's population was 2,026 in 415 households. The following census in 2011 counted 2,299 people in 608 households. The 2016 census measured the population of the village as 1,961 people in 573 households. It was the most populous village in its rural district.
