= Qovaq =

Qovaq or Qavaq (Persian: قواق), also known as Qaraq, may refer to:

- Qovaq-e Olya (disambiguation)
- Qovaq-e Sofla (disambiguation)
