= Amirabad, Sheykhdarabad =

Village in East Azerbaijan province, Iran

Amirabad Persian: اميراباد
- Village
- Location within Iran
- Coordinates: 37°22′07″N 47°40′38″E
- Country: Iran
- Province: East Azerbaijan
- County: Mianeh
- District: Central
- Rural District: Sheykhdarabad

Population (2016)
  - Total: Below reporting threshold
- Time zone: UTC+3:30 (IRST)

Amirabad (Persian: اميراباد) (Note: Also romanized as Amīrābād) is a village in Sheykhdarabad Rural District of the Central District in Mianeh County, East Azerbaijan province, Iran.

== Demographics ==
=== Population ===
At the time of the 2006 National Census, the village's population was 38 in eight households. The following census in 2011 counted 75 people in 25 households. The 2016 census measured the population of the village as below the reporting threshold.
