= Telim Kandi =

Village in East Azerbaijan province, Iran

Telim Kandi Persian: تليم كندي
- Village
- Location within Iran
- Coordinates: 37°19′03″N 47°24′53″E
- Country: Iran
- Province: East Azerbaijan
- County: Mianeh
- District: Central
- Rural District: Kolah Boz-e Gharbi

Population (2016)
  - Total: 213
- Time zone: UTC+3:30 (IRST)

Telim Kandi (Persian: تليم كندي) (Note: Also romanized as Telīm Kandī; also known as Telem Kandī) is a village in Kolah Boz-e Gharbi Rural District of the Central District in Mianeh County, East Azerbaijan province, Iran.

== Demographics ==
=== Population ===
At the time of the 2006 National Census, the village's population was 199 in 43 households. The following census in 2011 counted 243 people in 50 households. The 2016 census measured the population of the village as 213 people in 50 households.
