= Khubestan =

Village in East Azerbaijan province, Iran

Khubestan Persian: خوبستان
- Village
- Location within Iran
- Coordinates: 37°38′41″N 47°55′46″E
- Country: Iran
- Province: East Azerbaijan
- County: Mianeh
- District: Central
- Rural District: Garmeh-ye Jonubi

Population (2016)
  - Total: 329
- Time zone: UTC+3:30 (IRST)

Khubestan (Persian: خوبستان) (Note: Also romanized as Khūbestān, Khubostan and Khūbostān; also known as Ābastan and Ābestān) is a village in Garmeh-ye Jonubi Rural District of the Central District in Mianeh County, East Azerbaijan province, Iran.

== Demographics ==
=== Population ===
At the time of the 2006 National Census, the village's population was 591 in 105 households. The following census in 2011 counted 550 people in 125 households. The 2016 census measured the population of the village as 329 people in 128 households.
