= Balgeh Shir =

Village in Zanjan province, Iran

Balgeh Shir Persian: بلگه شير
- Village
- Location within Iran
- Coordinates: 36°07′10″N 48°46′03″E
- Country: Iran
- Province: Zanjan
- County: Khodabandeh
- District: Do Tappeh
- Rural District: Tup Qarah

Population (2016)
  - Total: 1,079
- Time zone: UTC+3:30 (IRST)

Balgeh Shir (Persian: بلگه شير) (Note: Also romanized as Balgeh Shīr; also known as Balgashīr, Balgekh-Shir, Balkeh Shīr, and Bilkehshīr) is a village in Tup Qarah Rural District of Do Tappeh District in Khodabandeh County, Zanjan province, Iran.

== Demographics ==
=== Population ===
At the time of the 2006 National Census, the village's population was 1,499 in 275 households, when it was in Howmeh Rural District of the Central District. The following census in 2011 counted 1,353 people in 347 households. The 2016 census measured the population of the village as 1,079 people in 278 households.

In 2020, the rural district was separated from the district in the formation of Do Tappeh District and Balgeh Shir was transferred to Tup Qarah Rural District created in the new district.
