= Yengabad-e Kuh =

Yengabad-e Kuh ینگ‌آبادکوه
- Village
- Location within Iran
- Coordinates: 37°21′36″N 47°43′27″E
- Country: Iran
- Province: East Azerbaijan
- County: Meyaneh
- Bakhsh: Central
- Rural District: Kolah Boz-e Sharqi

Population (2006)
  - Total: 223
- Time zone: UTC+3:30 (IRST)
  - Summer (DST): UTC+4:30 (IRDT)

Yengabad-e Kuh (Persian: ینگ‌آبادکوه, also Romanized as Yengābād-e Kūh; also known as Nīgābād-e Kūh) is a village in Kolah Boz-e Sharqi Rural District, in the Central District of Meyaneh County, East Azerbaijan Province, Iran. At the 2006 census, its population was 223, in 54 families.
