= Yengabad (disambiguation) =

Yengabad is a city in Isfahan Province, Iran.

Yengabad (Persian: ینگ‌آباد) may also refer to:

- Yengabad-e Chay, East Azerbaijan Province
- Yengabad-e Kuh, East Azerbaijan Province
- Yengabad, Hamadan
- Yengabad, Zanjan
