= Gavanlu, East Azerbaijan =

Village in East Azerbaijan province, Iran

Gavanlu Persian: گونلو
- Village
- Location within Iran
- Coordinates: 37°28′04″N 47°26′25″E
- Country: Iran
- Province: East Azerbaijan
- County: Mianeh
- District: Central
- Rural District: Owch Tappeh-ye Sharqi

Population (2016)
  - Total: 337
- Time zone: UTC+3:30 (IRST)

Gavanlu (Persian: گونلو) (Note: Also romanized as Gavanlū) is a village in Owch Tappeh-ye Sharqi Rural District of the Central District in Mianeh County, East Azerbaijan province, Iran.

== Demographics ==
=== Population ===
At the time of the 2006 National Census, the village's population was 539 in 118 households. The following census in 2011 counted 402 people in 97 households. The 2016 census measured the population of the village as 337 people in 100 households. It was the most populous village in its rural district.
