= Qarah Tavaraq =

Village in East Azerbaijan province, Iran

Qarah Tavaraq Persian: قره طورق
- Village
- Location within Iran
- Coordinates: 37°18′59″N 47°25′16″E
- Country: Iran
- Province: East Azerbaijan
- County: Mianeh
- District: Central
- Rural District: Kolah Boz-e Gharbi

Population (2016)
  - Total: 841
- Time zone: UTC+3:30 (IRST)

Qarah Tavaraq (Persian: قره طورق) (Note: Also romanized as Qarah Ţavaraq; also known as Qarāţūraq) is a village in Kolah Boz-e Gharbi Rural District of the Central District in Mianeh County, East Azerbaijan province, Iran.

== Demographics ==
=== Population ===
At the time of the 2006 National Census, the village's population was 1,086 in 214 households. The following census in 2011 counted 873 people in 218 households. The 2016 census measured the population of the village as 841 people in 220 households. It was the most populous village in its rural district.
