= Hesar Qaranqu =

Village in East Azerbaijan province, Iran

Hesar Qaranqu Persian: حصارقرانقو
- Village
- Location within Iran
- Coordinates: 37°24′07″N 47°40′39″E
- Country: Iran
- Province: East Azerbaijan
- County: Mianeh
- District: Central
- Rural District: Owch Tappeh-ye Sharqi

Population (2016)
  - Total: 122
- Time zone: UTC+3:30 (IRST)

Hesar Qaranqu (Persian: حصارقرانقو) (Note: Also romanized as Ḩeşār Qarānqū; also known as Ḩeşār and Ḩeşār Qarānlū) is a village in Owch Tappeh-ye Sharqi Rural District of the Central District in Mianeh County, East Azerbaijan province, Iran.

== Demographics ==
=== Population ===
At the time of the 2006 National Census, the village's population was 145 in 32 households. The following census in 2011 counted 147 people in 38 households. The 2016 census measured the population of the village as 122 people in 35 households.
