= Tup Qarah =

Tup Qarah (Persian: توپقره or توپ قره) may refer to:

- Tup Qarah, East Azerbaijan
- Tup Qarah, Zanjan
