= Qalujeh, East Azerbaijan =

Qalujeh قالوجه
- Village
- Location within Iran
- Coordinates: 37°12′25″N 47°42′47″E
- Country: Iran
- Province: East Azerbaijan
- County: Meyaneh
- Bakhsh: Central
- Rural District: Qezel Uzan

Population (2006)
  - Total: 61
- Time zone: UTC+3:30 (IRST)
  - Summer (DST): UTC+4:30 (IRDT)

Qalujeh (Persian: قالوجه, also Romanized as Qālūjeh) is a village in Qezel Uzan Rural District, in the Central District of Meyaneh County, East Azerbaijan Province, Iran. At the 2006 census, its population was 61, in 12 families.
