= Baranliq-e Hoseyn Khan =

Baranliq-e Hoseyn Khan برنليق حسين خان
- Village
- Location within Iran
- Coordinates: 37°32′43″N 47°47′08″E
- Country: Iran
- Province: East Azerbaijan
- County: Meyaneh
- Bakhsh: Central
- Rural District: Garmeh-ye Jonubi

Population (2006)
  - Total: 145
- Time zone: UTC+3:30 (IRST)
  - Summer (DST): UTC+4:30 (IRDT)

Baranliq-e Hoseyn Khan (Persian: برنليق حسين خان, also Romanized as Baranlīq-e Ḩoseyn Khān; also known as Baranlaq-e Ḩoseyn Khān, Baranlīq-e ‘Olyā, and Bernalīq-e Ḩoseyn Khān) is a village in Garmeh-ye Jonubi Rural District, in the Central District of Meyaneh County, East Azerbaijan Province, Iran. At the 2006 census, its population was 145, in 36 families.
