= Gol Makan, Zanjan =

Village in Zanjan province, Iran

Gol Makan Persian: گلمكان
- Village
- Location within Iran
- Coordinates: 36°03′39″N 48°48′26″E
- Country: Iran
- Province: Zanjan
- County: Khodabandeh
- District: Do Tappeh
- Rural District: Tup Qarah

Population (2016)
  - Total: 93
- Time zone: UTC+3:30 (IRST)

Gol Makan (Persian: گلمكان) (Note: Also romanized as Gol Makān and Golmakān; also known as Golmeh Gān, Kalmakān, Kol Makān, and Kul-Makan) is a village in Tup Qarah Rural District of Do Tappeh District in Khodabandeh County, Zanjan province, Iran.

== Demographics ==
=== Population ===
At the time of the 2006 National Census, the village's population was 149 in 32 households, when it was in Howmeh Rural District of the Central District. The following census in 2011 counted 113 people in 27 households. The 2016 census measured the population of the village as 93 people in 26 households.

In 2020, the rural district was separated from the district in the formation of Do Tappeh District and Gol Makan was transferred to Tup Qarah Rural District created in the new district.
