= Rahmatabad, Khodabandeh =

Village in Zanjan province, Iran

Rahmatabad Persian: رحمت اباد
- Village
- Location within Iran
- Coordinates: 36°05′03″N 48°46′52″E
- Country: Iran
- Province: Zanjan
- County: Khodabandeh
- District: Do Tappeh
- Rural District: Tup Qarah

Population (2016)
  - Total: 207
- Time zone: UTC+3:30 (IRST)

Rahmatabad (Persian: رحمت اباد) (Note: Also romanized as Raḩmatābād and Rehmatābād; also known as Raḩmatābād-e Khodābandeh) is a village in Tup Qarah Rural District of Do Tappeh District in Khodabandeh County, Zanjan province, Iran.

== Demographics ==
=== Population ===
At the time of the 2006 National Census, the village's population was 244 in 48 households, when it was in Howmeh Rural District of the Central District. The following census in 2011 counted 230 people in 56 households. The 2016 census measured the population of the village as 207 people in 67 households.

In 2020, the rural district was separated from the district in the formation of Do Tappeh District and Rahmatabad was transferred to Tup Qarah Rural District created in the new district.
