= Dadlu =

Village in East Azerbaijan province, Iran

Dadlu Persian: دادلو
- Village
- Location within Iran
- Coordinates: 37°08′06″N 47°42′08″E
- Country: Iran
- Province: East Azerbaijan
- County: Mianeh
- District: Central
- Rural District: Qezel Uzan

Population (2016)
  - Total: 658
- Time zone: UTC+3:30 (IRST)

Dadlu (Persian: دادلو) (Note: Also romanized as Dādlū) is a village in Qezel Uzan Rural District of the Central District in Mianeh County, East Azerbaijan province, Iran.

== Demographics ==
=== Population ===
At the time of the 2006 National Census, the village's population was 711 in 128 households. The following census in 2011 counted 760 people in 192 households. The 2016 census measured the population of the village as 658 people in 162 households. It was the most populous village in its rural district.
