= Qavaq-e Olya, East Azerbaijan =

Qavaq-e Olya قواق عليا
- Village
- Location within Iran
- Coordinates: 37°15′53″N 47°25′47″E
- Country: Iran
- Province: East Azerbaijan
- County: Meyaneh
- Bakhsh: Central
- Rural District: Kolah Boz-e Gharbi

Population (2006)
  - Total: 259
- Time zone: UTC+3:30 (IRST)
  - Summer (DST): UTC+4:30 (IRDT)

Qavaq-e Olya (Persian: قواق عليا, also Romanized as Qavāq-e ‘Olyā; also known as Qarāq-e Bālā) is a village in Kolah Boz-e Gharbi Rural District, in the Central District of Meyaneh County, East Azerbaijan Province, Iran. At the 2006 census, its population was 259, in 51 families.
