= Zenari =

Zenari زناري
- Village
- Location within Iran
- Coordinates: 37°29′11″N 47°57′16″E
- Country: Iran
- Province: East Azerbaijan
- County: Meyaneh
- Bakhsh: Central
- Rural District: Garmeh-ye Jonubi

Population (2006)
  - Total: 110
- Time zone: UTC+3:30 (IRST)
  - Summer (DST): UTC+4:30 (IRDT)

Zenari (Persian: زناري, also Romanized as Zenārī; also known as Zīnār) is a village in Garmeh-ye Jonubi Rural District, in the Central District of Meyaneh County, East Azerbaijan Province, Iran. At the 2006 census, its population was 110, in 27 families.
