= Quyujaq, Mianeh =

Village in East Azerbaijan province, Iran

Quyujaq Persian: قويوجاق
- Village
- Location within Iran
- Coordinates: 37°10′32″N 47°45′16″E
- Country: Iran
- Province: East Azerbaijan
- County: Mianeh
- District: Central
- Rural District: Qezel Uzan

Population (2016)
  - Total: 230
- Time zone: UTC+3:30 (IRST)

Quyujaq (Persian: قويوجاق) (Note: Also romanized as Qūyūjāq; also known as Qūyjāq) is the capital of Qezel Uzan Rural District in the Central District of Mianeh County, East Azerbaijan province, Iran.

== Demographics ==
=== Population ===
At the time of the 2006 National Census, the village's population was 248 in 62 households. The following census in 2011 counted 221 people in 61 households. The 2016 census measured the population of the village as 230 people in 76 households.
