= Kolah Boz =

Kolah Boz (Persian: كله بوز) may refer to:

- Kolah Boz-e Gharbi Rural District
- Kolah Boz-e Sharqi Rural District
