= Talvar Bolaghi =

Village in East Azerbaijan province, Iran

Talvar Bolaghi Persian: تلواربلاغي
- Village
- Location within Iran
- Coordinates: 37°17′21″N 47°32′12″E
- Country: Iran
- Province: East Azerbaijan
- County: Mianeh
- District: Central
- Rural District: Kolah Boz-e Gharbi

Population (2016)
  - Total: 225
- Time zone: UTC+3:30 (IRST)

Talvar Bolaghi (Persian: تلواربلاغي) (Note: Also romanized as Talvār Bolāghī) is a village in Kolah Boz-e Gharbi Rural District of the Central District in Mianeh County, East Azerbaijan province, Iran.

== Demographics ==
=== Population ===
At the time of the 2006 National Census, the village's population was 272 in 58 households. The following census in 2011 counted 223 people in 67 households. The 2016 census measured the population of the village as 225 people in 70 households.
