= Kangavar, East Azerbaijan =

Village in East Azerbaijan province, Iran

Kangavar Persian: كنگاور
- Village
- Location within Iran
- Coordinates: 37°17′47″N 47°36′49″E
- Country: Iran
- Province: East Azerbaijan
- County: Mianeh
- District: Central
- Rural District: Kolah Boz-e Sharqi

Population (2016)
  - Total: 254
- Time zone: UTC+3:30 (IRST)

Kangavar (Persian: كنگاور) (Note: Also romanized as Kangāvar and Kangūr) is a village in, and the capital of, Kolah Boz-e Sharqi Rural District in the Central District of Mianeh County, East Azerbaijan province, Iran.

== Demographics ==
=== Population ===
At the time of the 2006 National Census, the village's population was 383 in 78 households. The following census in 2011 counted 310 people in 82 households. The 2016 census measured the population of the village as 254 people in 78 households.
