= Beyg Bolaghi, Mianeh =

Village in East Azerbaijan province, Iran

Beyg Bolaghi Persian: بيگ بلاغي
- Village
- Location within Iran
- Coordinates: 37°25′16″N 47°27′11″E
- Country: Iran
- Province: East Azerbaijan
- County: Mianeh
- District: Central
- Rural District: Owch Tappeh-ye Sharqi

Population (2016)
  - Total: 140
- Time zone: UTC+3:30 (IRST)

Beyg Bolaghi (Persian: بيگ بلاغي) (Note: Also romanized as Beyg Bolāghī) is a village in Owch Tappeh-ye Sharqi Rural District of the Central District in Mianeh County, East Azerbaijan province, Iran.

== Demographics ==
=== Population ===
At the time of the 2006 National Census, the village's population was 141 in 29 households. The following census in 2011 counted 141 people in 38 households. The 2016 census measured the population of the village as 140 people in 44 households.
