= Gavani, East Azerbaijan =

Gavani گاواني
- Village
- Location within Iran
- Coordinates: 37°33′34″N 48°01′50″E
- Country: Iran
- Province: East Azerbaijan
- County: Meyaneh
- Bakhsh: Central
- Rural District: Garmeh-ye Jonubi

Population (2006)
  - Total: 60
- Time zone: UTC+3:30 (IRST)
  - Summer (DST): UTC+4:30 (IRDT)

Gavani (Persian: گاواني, also Romanized as Gāvānī; also known as Yavony) is a village in Garmeh-ye Jonubi Rural District, in the Central District of Meyaneh County, East Azerbaijan Province, Iran. At the 2006 census, its population was 60, in 9 families.
