= Sheykhlar =

Sheykhlar or Shaikhlar or Shaykhlyar (Persian: شيخلر) may refer to various places in Iran:

- Sheykhlar, Ardabil
- Sheykhlar, East Azerbaijan
- Sheykhlar, Marand, East Azerbaijan Province
- Sheykhlar, Golestan
- Sheykhlar, Qazvin
- Sheykhlar, West Azerbaijan
- Sheykhlar-e Mazari, West Azerbaijan Province
- Sheykhlar, Zanjan
- Sheykhlar, Khodabandeh, Zanjan province

== See also ==
- Shikhlar, Armenia
- Sheykhlu (disambiguation), various places in Iran
