= Pursekhlu =

Village in East Azerbaijan province, Iran

Pursekhlu Persian: پورسخلو
- Village
- Location within Iran
- Coordinates: 37°27′28″N 47°28′45″E
- Country: Iran
- Province: East Azerbaijan
- County: Mianeh
- District: Central
- Rural District: Owch Tappeh-ye Sharqi

Population (2016)
  - Total: 210
- Time zone: UTC+3:30 (IRST)

Pursekhlu (Persian: پورسخلو) (Note: Also romanized as Pūrsekhlū; also known as Porsekhlū) is a village in, and the capital of, Owch Tappeh-ye Sharqi Rural District in the Central District of Mianeh County, East Azerbaijan province, Iran.

== Demographics ==
=== Population ===
At the time of the 2006 National Census, the village's population was 307 in 64 households. The following census in 2011 counted 210 people in 56 households. The 2016 census measured the population of the village as 210 people in 66 households.
