= Bijeqin =

Village in Zanjan province, Iran

Bijeqin Persian: بيجقين
- Village
- Location within Iran
- Coordinates: 36°06′47″N 48°42′11″E
- Country: Iran
- Province: Zanjan
- County: Khodabandeh
- District: Do Tappeh
- Rural District: Tup Qarah

Population (2016)
  - Total: 1,065
- Time zone: UTC+3:30 (IRST)

Bijeqin (Persian: بيجقين) (Note: Also romanized as Bayjaqīn, Bijaqīn, and Bījeqīn; also known as Bidzhin and Bījgīn) is a village in Tup Qarah Rural District of Do Tappeh District in Khodabandeh County, Zanjan province, Iran.

== Demographics ==
=== Population ===
At the time of the 2006 National Census, the village's population was 1,025 in 199 households, when it was in Howmeh Rural District of the Central District. The following census in 2011 counted 1,077 people in 276 households. The 2016 census measured the population of the village as 1,065 people in 308 households.

In 2020, the rural district was separated from the district in the formation of Do Tappeh District and Bijeqin was transferred to Tup Qarah Rural District created in the new district.
