= Qarah Bolagh, Kolah Boz-e Sharqi =

Village in East Azerbaijan province, Iran

Qarah Bolagh Persian: قره بلاغ
- Village
- Location within Iran
- Coordinates: 37°20′29″N 47°39′27″E
- Country: Iran
- Province: East Azerbaijan
- County: Mianeh
- District: Central
- Rural District: Kolah Boz-e Sharqi

Population (2016)
  - Total: 228
- Time zone: UTC+3:30 (IRST)

Qarah Bolagh (Persian: قره بلاغ) (Note: Also romanized as Qarah Bolāgh and Qareh Bolāgh) is a village in Kolah Boz-e Sharqi Rural District of the Central District in Mianeh County, East Azerbaijan province, Iran.

== Demographics ==
=== Population ===
At the time of the 2006 National Census, the village's population was 280 in 66 households. The following census in 2011 counted 258 people in 72 households. The 2016 census measured the population of the village as 228 people in 70 households.
