= Sabz-e Arbat =

Village in East Azerbaijan province, Iran

Sabz-e Arbat Persian: سبز ارباط
- Village
- Location within Iran
- Coordinates: 37°25′42″N 47°47′04″E
- County: Iran
- Province: East Azerbaijan
- County: Mianeh
- District: Central
- Rural District: Qaflankuh-e Gharbi

Population (2016)
  - Total: 1,162
- Time zone: UTC+3:30 (IRST)

Sabz-e Arbat (Persian: سبز ارباط) (Note: Formerly known as Sabz (سبز), also romanized as Sabez) is a village in Qaflankuh-e Gharbi Rural District of the Central District in Mianeh County, East Azerbaijan province, Iran.

== Demographics ==
=== Population ===
At the time of the 2006 National Census, the village's population was 1,198 in 304 households, when it was named Sabz. The following census in 2011 counted 1,072 people in 336 households. The 2016 census measured the population of the village as 1,162 people in 394 households.

Sabz merged with the village of Arbat to become the village of Sabz-e Arbat in 2021.
