= Varjushan =

Village in Zanjan province, Iran

Varjushan Persian: ورجوشان
- Village
- Location within Iran
- Coordinates: 36°06′07″N 48°42′16″E
- Country: Iran
- Province: Zanjan
- County: Khodabandeh
- District: Do Tappeh
- Rural District: Tup Qarah

Population (2016)
  - Total: 609
- Time zone: UTC+3:30 (IRST)

Varjushan (Persian: ورجوشان) (Note: Also romanized as Vardzhushan, Varjūshān and Warjushān) is a village in Tup Qarah Rural District of Do Tappeh District in Khodabandeh County, Zanjan province, Iran.

== Demographics ==
=== Population ===
At the time of the 2006 National Census, the village's population was 708 in 139 households, when it was in Howmeh Rural District of the Central District. The following census in 2011 counted 726 people in 181 households. The 2016 census measured the population of the village as 609 people in 177 households.

In 2020, the rural district was separated from the district in the formation of Do Tappeh District and Varjushan was transferred to Tup Qarah Rural District created in the new district.
