= Dashlujeh, Zanjan =

Village in Zanjan province, Iran

Dashlujeh Persian: داشلوجه
- Village
- Location within Iran
- Coordinates: 36°13′23″N 48°49′38″E
- Country: Iran
- Province: Zanjan
- County: Khodabandeh
- District: Do Tappeh
- Rural District: Howmeh

Population (2016)
  - Total: 450
- Time zone: UTC+3:30 (IRST)

Dashlujeh (Persian: داشلوجه) (Note: Also romanized as Dāshlūjeh; also known as Vāshlūjeh, and Wāshlūjeh) is a village in Howmeh Rural District of Do Tappeh District in Khodabandeh County, Zanjan province, Iran.

== Demographics ==
=== Population ===
At the time of the 2006 National Census, the village's population was 522 in 108 households, when it was in the Central District. The following census in 2011 counted 516 people in 153 households. The 2016 census measured the population of the village as 450 people in 127 households.

In 2020, the rural district was separated from the district in the formation of Do Tappeh District.
