= Yengabad-e Chay =

Village in East Azerbaijan province, Iran

Yengabad-e Chay Persian: ینگ‌آبادچای
- Village
- Location within Iran
- Coordinates: 37°23′27″N 47°41′27″E
- Country: Iran
- Province: East Azerbaijan
- County: Mianeh
- District: Central
- Rural District: Sheykhdarabad

Population (2016)
  - Total: 112
- Time zone: UTC+3:30 (IRST)

Yengabad-e Chay (Persian: ینگ‌آبادچای) (Note: Also romanized as Yengābād-e Chāy; also known as Yengīābād-e Chā'ī) is a village in Sheykhdarabad Rural District of the Central District in Mianeh County, East Azerbaijan province, Iran.

== Demographics ==
=== Population ===
At the time of the 2006 National Census, the village's population was 178 in 43 households. The following census in 2011 counted 154 people in 41 households. The 2016 census measured the population of the village as 112 people in 37 households.
