= Gundughdi, Mianeh =

Village in East Azerbaijan province, Iran

Gundughdi Persian: گوندوغدي
- Village
- Location within Iran
- Coordinates: 37°28′10″N 47°50′57″E
- Country: Iran
- Province: East Azerbaijan
- County: Mianeh
- District: Central
- Rural District: Garmeh-ye Jonubi

Population (2016)
  - Total: 1,024
- Time zone: UTC+3:30 (IRST)

Gundughdi (Persian: گوندوغدي), (Note: Also romanized as Goondooghdi and Gūndūghdī; also known as Gūndoghdī and Kandugada) is a village in, and the capital of, Garmeh-ye Jonubi Rural District in the Central District of Mianeh County, East Azerbaijan province, Iran.

== Demographics ==
=== Population ===
At the time of the 2006 National Census, the village's population was 1,356 in 292 households. The following census in 2011 counted 1,227 people in 356 households. The 2016 census measured the population of the village as 1,024 people in 304 households. It was the most populous village in its rural district.
