= Tup Qarah, Zanjan =

Village in Zanjan province, Iran

Tup Qarah Persian: توپ قره
- Village
- Location within Iran
- Coordinates: 36°08′12″N 48°45′15″E
- Country: Iran
- Province: Zanjan
- County: Khodabandeh
- District: Do Tappeh
- Rural District: Tup Qarah

Population (2016)
  - Total: 890
- Time zone: UTC+3:30 (IRST)

Tup Qarah (Persian: توپ قره) (Note: Also romanized as Tūp Qarah and Tūp Qareh; also known as Tūp Qarā’ and Tupkarekh) is a village in, and the capital of, Tup Qarah Rural District in Do Tappeh District of Khodabandeh County, Zanjan province, Iran.

== Demographics ==
=== Population ===
At the time of the 2006 National Census, the village's population was 1,187 in 266 households, when it was in Howmeh Rural District of the Central District. The following census in 2011 counted 1,024 people in 298 households. The 2016 census measured the population of the village as 890 people in 277 households.

In 2020, the rural district was separated from the district in the formation of Do Tappeh District and Tup Qarah was transferred to Tup Qarah Rural District created in the new district.
