= Hallaj-e Olya =

Village in East Azerbaijan province, Iran

Hallaj-e Olya Persian: حلاج عليا
- Village
- Location within Iran
- Coordinates: 37°10′09″N 47°35′01″E
- Country: Iran
- Province: East Azerbaijan
- County: Mianeh
- District: Central
- Rural District: Qezel Uzan

Population (2016)
  - Total: 393
- Time zone: UTC+3:30 (IRST)

Hallaj-e Olya (Persian: حلاج عليا) (Note: Also romanized as Ḩallāj-e ‘Olyā) is a village in Qezel Uzan Rural District of the Central District in Mianeh County, East Azerbaijan province, Iran.

== Demographics ==
=== Population ===
At the time of the 2006 National Census, the village's population was 366 in 59 households. The following census in 2011 counted 360 people in 90 households. The 2016 census measured the population of the village as 393 people in 103 households.
