= Ahar Meshkin =

Village in Zanjan province, Iran

Ahar Meshkin Persian: اهارمشكين
- Village
- Location within Iran
- Coordinates: 36°03′51″N 48°43′32″E
- Country: Iran
- Province: Zanjan
- County: Khodabandeh
- District: Do Tappeh
- Rural District: Tup Qarah

Population (2016)
  - Total: 916
- Time zone: UTC+3:30 (IRST)

Ahar Meshkin (Persian: اهارمشكين) (Note: Also romanized as Āhār Meshkīn; also known as Āhār Meshgīn, Ahār Namkīn, Armshakan, and Armushkun) is a village in Tup Qarah Rural District of Do Tappeh District in Khodabandeh County, Zanjan province, Iran.

== Demographics ==
=== Population ===
At the time of the 2006 National Census, the village's population was 1,010 in 217 households, when it was in Khararud Rural District of the Central District. The following census in 2011 counted 974 people in 260 households. The 2016 census measured the population of the village as 916 people in 241 households.

In 2020, the village was separated from the district in the formation of Do Tappeh District and transferred to Tup Qarah Rural District created in the new district.
