= Gavani =

Gavani may refer to:

- Gavani, Iran (disambiguation)
- Găvani, Romania
