= Hallaj-e Sofla =

Village in East Azerbaijan province, Iran

Hallaj-e Sofla Persian: حلاج سفلي
- Village
- Location within Iran
- Coordinates: 37°09′03″N 47°36′29″E
- Country: Iran
- Province: East Azerbaijan
- County: Mianeh
- District: Central
- Rural District: Qezel Uzan

Population (2016)
  - Total: 325
- Time zone: UTC+3:30 (IRST)

Hallaj-e Sofla (Persian: حلاج سفلي) (Note: Also romanized as Ḩallāj-e Soflá) is a village in Qezel Uzan Rural District of the Central District in Mianeh County, East Azerbaijan province, Iran.

== Demographics ==
=== Population ===
At the time of the 2006 National Census, the village's population was 305 in 57 households. The following census in 2011 counted 251 people in 60 households. The 2016 census measured the population of the village as 325 people in 82 households.
