= Zarnaq (disambiguation) =

Zarnaq is a placename in Iran. It may refer to:

- Zarnaq
- Zarnaq, Meyaneh
- Zarnaq, Tabriz
- Zarnaq, Khoda Afarin
