= Qatar Bolaghi =

Village in Zanjan province, Iran

Qatar Bolaghi Persian: قطاربلاغي
- Village
- Location within Iran
- Coordinates: 36°01′05″N 48°51′21″E
- Country: Iran
- Province: Zanjan
- County: Khodabandeh
- District: Do Tappeh
- Rural District: Howmeh

Population (2016)
  - Total: 36
- Time zone: UTC+3:30 (IRST)

Qatar Bolaghi (Persian: قطار بلاغی) (Note: Also romanized as Qaţār Bolāghī; also known as Qaţār Bolāgh and Qātir Bulāq) is a village in Howmeh Rural District of Do Tappeh District in Khodabandeh County, Zanjan province, Iran.

== Demographics ==
=== Population ===
At the time of the 2006 National Census, the village's population was 87 in 16 households, when it was in the Central District. The following census in 2011 counted 46 people in 11 households. The 2016 census measured the population of the village as 36 people in eight households.

In 2020, the rural district was separated from the district in the formation of Do Tappeh District.
