= Bashmaq, Mianeh =

Village in East Azerbaijan province, Iran

Bashmaq Persian: باشماق
- Village
- Location within Iran
- Coordinates: 37°18′24″N 47°29′10″E
- Country: Iran
- Province: East Azerbaijan
- County: Mianeh
- District: Central
- Rural District: Kolah Boz-e Gharbi

Population (2016)
  - Total: 533
- Time zone: UTC+3:30 (IRST)

Bashmaq (Persian: باشماق) (Note: Also romanized as Bāshmāq) is a village in, and the capital of, Kolah Boz-e Gharbi Rural District in the Central District of Mianeh County, East Azerbaijan province, Iran.

== Demographics ==
=== Population ===
At the time of the 2006 National Census, the village's population was 988 in 214 households. The following census in 2011 counted 677 people in 180 households. The 2016 census measured the population of the village as 533 people in 156 households.
