= Chorak =

Chorak may refer to:

- Jason Chorak (b. 1974), American football player
- Chorak, Hormozgan, a village in Hormozgan Province, Iran
- Chorak, Zanjan, a village in Zanjan Province, Iran
