= Chopoqlu, Howmeh =

Village in Zanjan province, Iran

Chopoqlu Persian: چپقلو
- Village
- Location within Iran
- Coordinates: 36°11′34″N 48°54′01″E
- Country: Iran
- Province: Zanjan
- County: Khodabandeh
- District: Do Tappeh
- Rural District: Howmeh

Population (2016)
  - Total: 162
- Time zone: UTC+3:30 (IRST)

Chopoqlu (Persian: چپقلو) (Note: Also romanized as Chopoqlū; also known as Chabqolū, Choboqlū, and Jabūk’alū) is a village in Howmeh Rural District of Do Tappeh District in Khodabandeh County, Zanjan province, Iran.

== Demographics ==
=== Population ===
At the time of the 2006 National Census, the village's population was 282 in 54 households, when it was in the Central District. The following census in 2011 counted 249 people in 75 households. The 2016 census measured the population of the village as 162 people in 49 households.

In 2020, the rural district was separated from the district in the formation of Do Tappeh District.
