= Tup Qarah Rural District =

Rural district in Zanjan province, Iran

Tup Qarah Rural District Persian: دهستان توپقره
- Rural District
- Location within Iran
- Coordinates: 36°07′N 48°45′E
- Country: Iran
- Province: Zanjan
- County: Khodabandeh
- District: Do Tappeh
- Established: 2020
- Capital: Tup Qarah
- Time zone: UTC+3:30 (IRST)

Tup Qarah Rural District (Persian: دهستان توپقره) is in Do Tappeh District of Khodabandeh County, Zanjan province, Iran. Its capital is the village of Tup Qarah, whose population at the time of the 2016 National Census was 890 in 277 households.

== Other villages in the rural district ==
- Ahar Meshkin
- Balgeh Shir
- Bijeqin
- Deh Shir
- Gol Makan
- Nalbandan
- Parchin
- Qusheh Kand
- Rahmatabad
- Sheykh Alu
- Varjushan

== History ==
In 2020, Howmeh Rural District was separated from the Central District in the formation of Do Tappeh District, and Tup Qarah Rural District was created in the new district.
