= Golujeh-ye Khaleseh =

Village in East Azerbaijan province, Iran

Golujeh-ye Khaleseh Persian: گلوجه خالصه
- Village
- Location within Iran
- Coordinates: 37°12′20″N 47°48′20″E
- County: Iran
- Province: East Azerbaijan
- County: Mianeh
- District: Central
- Rural District: Qaflankuh-e Gharbi

Population (2016)
  - Total: 599
- Time zone: UTC+3:30 (IRST)

Golujeh-ye Khaleseh (Persian: گلوجه خالصه) (Note: Also romanized as Golūjeh-ye Khāleşeh; also known as Kallūcheh, Kaloocheh, Kollūcheh-ye Khāleşeh, Kollūjeh Khāleseh, Kollūjeh-ye Khāleşeh, Kolūcheh, and Kolūcheh-ye Khāleşeh) is a village in Qaflankuh-e Gharbi Rural District of the Central District in Mianeh County, East Azerbaijan province, Iran.

== Demographics ==
=== Population ===
At the time of the 2006 National Census, the village's population was 1,131 in 273 households. The following census in 2011 counted 884 people in 272 households. The 2016 census measured the population of the village as 599 people in 190 households.
