= Qaflankuh =

Qaflankuh (Persian: قافلانكوه) may refer to:

- Qaflankuh-e Gharbi Rural District
- Qaflankuh-e Sharqi Rural District
