= Agh Qeshlaq =

Agh Qeshlaq (Persian: اغ قشلاق) may refer to:

- Agh Qeshlaq, Khoda Afarin
- Agh Qeshlaq, Meyaneh
