= Aqcheh Qaya =

Village in Zanjan province, Iran

Aqcheh Qaya Persian: اقچه قيا
- Village
- Location within Iran
- Coordinates: 36°03′31″N 48°55′28″E
- Country: Iran
- Province: Zanjan
- County: Khodabandeh
- District: Do Tappeh
- Rural District: Howmeh

Population (2016)
  - Total: 1,426
- Time zone: UTC+3:30 (IRST)

Aqcheh Qaya (Persian: اقچه قيا) (Note: Also known as Aqcheh Qayeh, Āqcheh Qayeh, Āqjeh Qayā, Āqjeh Qayah, Āqjeh Qayeh, Āqjeh Qīā, and Aqjeh Qīya) is a village in, and the capital of, Howmeh Rural District in Do Tappeh District of Khodabandeh County, Zanjan province, Iran. The previous capital of the rural district was the village of Do Tappeh-ye Sofla. (Note: Renamed Do Tappeh)

== Demographics ==
=== Population ===
At the time of the 2006 National Census, the village's population was 1,469 in 312 households, when it was in the Central District. The following census in 2011 counted 1,537 people in 434 households. The 2016 census measured the population of the village as 1,426 people in 401 households.

In 2020, the rural district was separated from the district in the formation of Do Tappeh District.
