= Robat, Zanjan =

Village in Zanjan province, Iran

Robat Persian: رباط
- Village
- Location within Iran
- Coordinates: 36°03′00″N 48°47′56″E
- Country: Iran
- Province: Zanjan
- County: Khodabandeh
- District: Do Tappeh
- Rural District: Howmeh

Population (2016)
  - Total: 29
- Time zone: UTC+3:30 (IRST)

Robat (Persian: رباط) (Note: Also romanized as Robāţ; also known as Ribāt) is a village in Howmeh Rural District of Do Tappeh District in Khodabandeh County, Zanjan province, Iran.

== Demographics ==
=== Population ===
At the time of the 2006 National Census, the village's population was 65 in 16 households, when it was in Khararud Rural District of the Central District. The following census in 2011 counted 57 people in 16 households. The 2016 census measured the population of the village as 29 people in 10 households.

In 2020, Howmeh Rural District was separated from the district in the formation of Do Tappeh District, and Robat was transferred to the rural district.
