= Goveni =

Goveni or Gavani or Guni (Persian: گوني or گاواني) may refer to:

- Gavani, East Azerbaijan
- Goveni, Kermanshah
- Guni, West Azerbaijan
- Guni, Zanjan
- Guni, Vedensky District
- Guni (biblical figure)
- Guni Israeli (born 1984), Israeli basketball player
