= Qusheh Kand =

Village in Zanjan province, Iran

Qusheh Kand Persian: قوشه كند
- Village
- Location within Iran
- Coordinates: 36°04′19″N 48°42′10″E
- Country: Iran
- Province: Zanjan
- County: Khodabandeh
- District: Do Tappeh
- Rural District: Tup Qarah

Population (2016)
  - Total: 467
- Time zone: UTC+3:30 (IRST)

Qusheh Kand (Persian: قوشه كند) (Note: Also romanized as Qowsheh Kand and Qūsheh Kand; also known as Ghoosheh Kand, Kushakand, and Qowjeh Kand) is a village in Tup Qarah Rural District of Do Tappeh District in Khodabandeh County, Zanjan province, Iran.

== Demographics ==
=== Population ===
At the time of the 2006 National Census, the village's population was 619 in 113 households, when it was in Khararud Rural District of the Central District. The following census in 2011 counted 549 people in 132 households. The 2016 census measured the population of the village as 467 people in 117 households.

In 2020, the village was separated from the district in the formation of Do Tappeh District and transferred to Tup Qarah Rural District created in the new district.
