= Shahrestanak, Zanjan =

Village in Zanjan province, Iran

Shahrestanak Persian: شهرستانك
- Village
- Location within Iran
- Coordinates: 36°00′30″N 48°48′08″E
- Country: Iran
- Province: Zanjan
- County: Khodabandeh
- District: Do Tappeh
- Rural District: Howmeh

Population (2016)
  - Total: 107
- Time zone: UTC+3:30 (IRST)

Shahrestanak (Persian: شهرستانك) (Note: Also romanized as Shahrestānak; also known as Sahr Satāna and Shakhrisdana) is a village in Howmeh Rural District of Do Tappeh District in Khodabandeh County, Zanjan province, Iran.

== Demographics ==
=== Population ===
At the time of the 2006 National Census, the village's population was 116 in 28 households, when it was in Khararud Rural District of the Central District. The following census in 2011 counted 127 people in 34 households. The 2016 census measured the population of the village as 107 people in 34 households.

In 2020, Howmeh Rural District was separated from the district in the formation of Do Tappeh District, and Shahrestanak was transferred to the rural district.
