= Do Tappeh-ye Olya =

Village in Zanjan province, Iran

Do Tappeh-ye Olya Persian: دوتپه عليا
- Village
- Location within Iran
- Coordinates: 36°06′41″N 48°54′46″E
- Country: Iran
- Province: Zanjan
- County: Khodabandeh
- District: Do Tappeh
- Rural District: Howmeh

Population (2016)
  - Total: 203
- Time zone: UTC+3:30 (IRST)

Do Tappeh-ye Olya (Persian: دوتپه عليا) (Note: Also romanized as Do Tappeh ‘Olyā and Do Tappeh-ye ‘Olyā; also known as Do Tappeh Bālā, Do Tappeh-ye Bālā, Dow Tappeh Bālā, and Panehduz) is a village in Howmeh Rural District of Do Tappeh District in Khodabandeh County, Zanjan province, Iran.

== Demographics ==
=== Population ===
At the time of the 2006 National Census, the village's population was 302 in 54 households, when it was in the Central District. The following census in 2011 counted 286 people in 68 households. The 2016 census measured the population of the village as 203 people in 62 households.

In 2020, the rural district was separated from the district in the formation of Do Tappeh District.
