= Chetab-e Olya =

Village in East Azerbaijan province, Iran

Chetab-e Olya Persian: چتاب عليا
- Village
- Location within Iran
- Coordinates: 37°30′43″N 47°50′58″E
- Country: Iran
- Province: East Azerbaijan
- County: Mianeh
- District: Central
- Rural District: Garmeh-ye Jonubi

Population (2016)
  - Total: 448
- Time zone: UTC+3:30 (IRST)

Chetab-e Olya (Persian: چتاب عليا) (Note: Also romanized as Chetāb-e ‘Olyā; also known as Chetāb-e Ḩoseyn Khān (چتاب حسين خان), Chetāb-e Ḩoseyn Khānī, and Chetāb-e Ḩoseynkhānī) is a village in Garmeh-ye Jonubi Rural District of the Central District in Mianeh County, East Azerbaijan province, Iran.

== Demographics ==
=== Population ===
At the time of the 2006 National Census, the village's population was 466 in 109 households. The following census in 2011 counted 462 people in 128 households. The 2016 census measured the population of the village as 448 people in 127 households.
