= Zinar =

Zinar may refer to:

- Zenari, Iran
- The Hittite lyre
