= Qovaq-e Olya =

Qovaq-e Olya or Qavaq-e Olya (Persian: قواق عليا) may refer to:

- Qavaq-e Olya, East Azerbaijan
- Qovaq-e Olya, Zanjan
