= Sheykhdarabad Rural District =

Rural district in East Azerbaijan province, Iran

Sheykhdarabad Rural District Persian: دهستان شيخ درآباد
- Rural District
- Location within Iran
- Coordinates: 37°22′N 47°37′E
- Country: Iran
- Province: East Azerbaijan
- County: Mianeh
- District: Central
- Established: 1987
- Capital: Sheykhdarabad

Population (2016)
  - Total: 1,799
- Time zone: UTC+3:30 (IRST)

Sheykhdarabad Rural District (Persian: دهستان شيخ درآباد) is in the Central District of Mianeh County, East Azerbaijan province, Iran. Its capital is the village of Sheykhdarabad.

== Demographics ==
=== Population ===
At the time of the 2006 National Census, the rural district's population was 2,372 in 503 households. There were 2,308 inhabitants in 653 households at the following census of 2011. The 2016 census measured the population of the rural district as 1,799 in 544 households. The most populous of its four villages was Sheykhdarabad, with 1,681 people.

=== Other villages in the rural district ===
- Amirabad
- Yengabad-e Chay
