= Achachi =

City in East Azerbaijan province, Iran

Achachi Persian: آچاچی
- City
- Location within Iran
- Coordinates: 37°23′38″N 47°47′39″E
- Country: Iran
- Province: East Azerbaijan
- County: Mianeh
- District: Central
- Established as a city: 2013

Population (2016)
  - Total: 3,647
- Time zone: UTC+3:30 (IRST)

Achachi (Persian: آچاچی) (Note: Also romanized as Āchāchī; Azerbaijani Turkish: Açaçı) is a city in the Central District of Mianeh County, East Azerbaijan province, Iran, serving as the administrative center for Qaflankuh-e Gharbi Rural District.

== Etymology ==
According to Vladimir Minorsky, the name "Achachi" is derived from the Mongolian language and means "carriers of loads (achān)".

== Demographics ==
=== Language and ethnicity ===
The Achachi people are Azerbaijani and speak Azerbaijani Turkish.

=== Population ===
At the time of the 2006 National Census, Achachi's population was 3,777 in 1,020 households, when it was a village in Qaflankuh-e Gharbi Rural District. The following census in 2011 counted 3,683 people in 1,151 households. The 2016 census measured the population as 3,647 people in 1,190 households, by which time Achachi had been converted to a city.

== Geography ==
The Qezel Uzan and Miyanchay Rivers of Azerbaijan meet in Achachi. The Qaflankuh mountain range and its tunnels, as well as the Maiden's Tower and the Maiden's Bridge, are south of th city. The Tehran-Tabriz-Europe transit road passes through the center of the city.

== Economy ==
The presence of numerous supermarkets along the way has turned Achachi into a market for dried fruits, dairy products and souvenirs in Azerbaijan.

== Sports ==
The city is famous for training highly qualified athletes in weightlifting and cycling.
