= Qovaq-e Sofla =

Qovaq-e Sofla or Qavaq-e Sofla (Persian: قواق سفلي) may refer to:

- Qavaq-e Sofla, East Azerbaijan
- Qovaq-e Sofla, Zanjan
