= Qanli =

Village in Zanjan province, Iran

Qanli Persian: قانلي
- Village
- Location within Iran
- Coordinates: 36°13′25″N 48°51′56″E
- Country: Iran
- Province: Zanjan
- County: Khodabandeh
- District: Do Tappeh
- Rural District: Howmeh

Population (2016)
  - Total: 265
- Time zone: UTC+3:30 (IRST)

Qanli (Persian: قانلي) (Note: Also romanized as Qānlī; also known as Kanlu, Khānlū, Qaflu, and Qānlū) is a village in Howmeh Rural District of Do Tappeh District in Khodabandeh County, Zanjan province, Iran.

== Demographics ==
=== Population ===
At the time of the 2006 National Census, the village's population was 324 in 58 households, when it was in the Central District. The following census in 2011 counted 285 people in 68 households. The 2016 census measured the population of the village as 265 people in 68 households.

In 2020, the rural district was separated from the district in the formation of Do Tappeh District.
