= Sheykh Alu =

Village in Zanjan province, Iran

Sheykh Alu Persian: شيخ الو
- Village
- Location within Iran
- Coordinates: 36°07′53″N 48°42′34″E
- Country: Iran
- Province: Zanjan
- County: Khodabandeh
- District: Do Tappeh
- Rural District: Tup Qarah

Population (2016)
  - Total: 726
- Time zone: UTC+3:30 (IRST)

Sheykh Alu (Persian: شيخ الو) (Note: Also romanized as Sheykh ‘Alū; also known as Shaikh ‘Ali, Shaykh-Ali, Sheykhlar, and Sheykhlū) is a village in Tup Qarah Rural District of Do Tappeh District in Khodabandeh County, Zanjan province, Iran.

== Demographics ==
=== Population ===
At the time of the 2006 National Census, the village's population was 771 in 160 households, when it was in Howmeh Rural District of the Central District. The following census in 2011 counted 788 people in 212 households. The 2016 census measured the population of the village as 726 people in 215 households.

In 2020, the rural district was separated from the district in the formation of Do Tappeh District and Sheykh Alu was transferred to Tup Qarah Rural District created in the new district.
