= Do Tappeh, Zanjan =

Village in Zanjan province, Iran

Do Tappeh Persian: دوتپه
- Village
- Location within Iran
- Coordinates: 36°07′42″N 48°50′14″E
- Country: Iran
- Province: Zanjan
- County: Khodabandeh
- District: Do Tappeh
- Rural District: Howmeh

Population (2016)
  - Total: 4,094
- Time zone: UTC+3:30 (IRST)

Do Tappeh (Persian: دوتپه سفلي) (Note: Also romanized as Dav-Tappeh and Dow Tappeh; formerly Do Tappeh-ye Sofla (دوتپه سفلي), also romanized as Do Tappeh-ye Soflá; also known as Dav-Tappekh, Do Tappeh Pā’īn, Do Tappeh-ye Pā’īn, Dow Tappeh Pā’īn, and Dūleh; Azerbaijani: Dovtәpә) is a village in, and the former capital of, Howmeh Rural District in Do Tappeh District of Khodabandeh County, Zanjan province, Iran, serving as capital of the district. The capital of the rural district has been transferred to the village of Aqcheh Qaya.

== Demographics ==
=== Population ===
At the time of the 2006 National Census, the village's population was 3,806 in 823 households, when it was in the Central District. The following census in 2011 counted 4,132 people in 1,150 households. The 2016 census measured the population of the village as 4,094 people in 1,209 households. It was the most populous village in its rural district.

In 2020, the rural district was separated from the district in the formation of Do Tappeh District.
