= Sheykhlar, Qazvin =

Sheykhlar-ishikhlar شيخلر
- Village
- Location within Iran
- Coordinates: 36°23′40″N 49°25′16″E
- Country: Iran
- Province: Qazvin
- County: Qazvin
- Bakhsh: Tarom Sofla
- Rural District: Kuhgir

Population (2006)
  - Total: 72
- Time zone: UTC+3:30 (IRST)
  - Summer (DST): UTC+4:30 (IRDT)

Sheykhlar (Persian: شيخلر, also Romanized as Shaikhlar and Shaykhlyar) is a village in Kuhgir Rural District, Tarom Sofla District, Qazvin County, Qazvin Province, Iran. At the 2006 census, its population was 72, in 22 families.
