= Golujeh-ye Hasan Beyg =

Golujeh-ye Hasan Beyg گلوجه حسن بيگ
- Village
- Location within Iran
- Coordinates: 37°27′06″N 46°36′09″E
- Country: Iran
- Province: East Azerbaijan
- County: Hashtrud
- Bakhsh: Nazarkahrizi
- Rural District: Almalu

Population (2006)
  - Total: 277
- Time zone: UTC+3:30 (IRST)
  - Summer (DST): UTC+4:30 (IRDT)

Golujeh-ye Hasan Beyg (Persian: گلوجه حسن بيگ, also Romanized as Golūjeh-ye Ḩasan Beyg) is a village in Almalu Rural District, Nazarkahrizi District, Hashtrud County, East Azerbaijan Province, Iran. At the 2006 census, its population was 277, in 40 families.
