= Allah Dad-e Zehi =

Allah Dad-e Zehi اله داد زهي
- Village
- Location within Iran
- Coordinates: 25°33′29″N 61°08′58″E
- Country: Iran
- Province: Sistan and Baluchestan
- County: Chabahar
- Bakhsh: Polan
- Rural District: Polan

Population (2006)
  - Total: 266
- Time zone: UTC+3:30 (IRST)
  - Summer (DST): UTC+4:30 (IRDT)

Allah Dad-e Zehi (Persian: اله داد زهي, also Romanized as Allāh Dād-e Zehī; also known as Aldād Zehī, Allāhābād, Allāh Dād, Allāh Dād Zā’ī, Allāh Zā’ī, Allāhzī, and Ilāhdād) is a village in Polan Rural District, Polan District, Chabahar County, Sistan and Baluchestan Province, Iran. At the 2006 census, its population was 266, in 40 families.
