= Choragh-e Suz =

Choragh-e Suz چراغ سوز
- Village
- Location within Iran
- Coordinates: 26°54′25″N 57°24′01″E
- Country: Iran
- Province: Hormozgan
- County: Minab
- Bakhsh: Senderk
- Rural District: Senderk

Population (2006)
  - Total: 646
- Time zone: UTC+3:30 (IRST)
  - Summer (DST): UTC+4:30 (IRDT)

Choragh-e Suz (Persian: چراغ سوز, also Romanized as Chorāgh-e Sūz; also known as Chorāk) is a village in Senderk Rural District, Senderk District, Minab County, Hormozgan Province, Iran. At the 2006 census, its population was 646, in 187 families.
