= Sheykhlu, Razavi Khorasan =

Sheykhlu شيخ لو
- Village
- Location within Iran
- Coordinates: 35°16′14″N 60°24′46″E
- Country: Iran
- Province: Razavi Khorasan
- County: Torbat-e Jam
- Bakhsh: Central
- Rural District: Mian Jam

Population (2006)
  - Total: 240
- Time zone: UTC+3:30 (IRST)
  - Summer (DST): UTC+4:30 (IRDT)

Sheykhlu (Persian: شيخ لو, also Romanized as Sheykhlū, Shekhlow, and Shekhlū) is a village in Mian Jam Rural District, in the Central District of Torbat-e Jam County, Razavi Khorasan Province, Iran. At the 2006 census, its population was 240, in 60 families.
