= Golujeh-ye Said =

Golujeh-ye Said گلوجه سعيد
- Village
- Location within Iran
- Coordinates: 37°41′07″N 46°46′22″E
- Country: Iran
- Province: East Azerbaijan
- County: Bostanabad
- Bakhsh: Tekmeh Dash
- Rural District: Ujan-e Sharqi

Population (2006)
  - Total: 307
- Time zone: UTC+3:30 (IRST)
  - Summer (DST): UTC+4:30 (IRDT)

Golujeh-ye Said (Persian: گلوجه سعيد, also Romanized as Golūjeh-ye Sa‘īd; also known as Golūjeh) is a village in Ujan-e Sharqi Rural District, Tekmeh Dash District, Bostanabad County, East Azerbaijan Province, Iran. At the 2006 census, its population was 307, in 71 families.
