= Gun Dughdi, Bostanabad =

Gun Dughdi گوندوغدي
- Village
- Location within Iran
- Coordinates: 37°37′07″N 46°37′27″E
- Country: Iran
- Province: East Azerbaijan
- County: Bostanabad
- Bakhsh: Tekmeh Dash
- Rural District: Sahandabad

Population (2006)
  - Total: 189
- Time zone: UTC+3:30 (IRST)
  - Summer (DST): UTC+4:30 (IRDT)

Gun Dughdi (Persian: گوندوغدي, also Romanized as Gūn Dūghdī and Gūndūghdī) is a village in Sahandabad Rural District, Tekmeh Dash District, Bostanabad County, East Azerbaijan Province, Iran. At the 2006 census, its population was 189, in 39 families.
