= Shakhmelu =

Shakhmelu شخملو
- Village
- Location within Iran
- Coordinates: 39°07′04″N 47°11′43″E
- Country: Iran
- Province: East Azerbaijan
- County: Kaleybar
- Bakhsh: Central
- Rural District: Mulan

Population (2006)
  - Total: 48
- Time zone: UTC+3:30 (IRST)
  - Summer (DST): UTC+4:30 (IRDT)

Shakhmelu (Persian: شخملو, also Romanized as Shakhmelū; also known as Sheykhlū) is a village in Mulan Rural District, in the Central District of Kaleybar County, East Azerbaijan Province, Iran. At the 2006 census, its population was 48, in 10 families.
