= Golujeh-ye Mohammad Khan =

Golujeh-ye Mohammad Khan گلوجه محمدخان
- Village
- Location within Iran
- Coordinates: 37°29′22″N 46°44′10″E
- Country: Iran
- Province: East Azerbaijan
- County: Hashtrud
- Bakhsh: Central
- Rural District: Qaranqu

Population (2006)
  - Total: 235
- Time zone: UTC+3:30 (IRST)
  - Summer (DST): UTC+4:30 (IRDT)

Golujeh-ye Mohammad Khan (Persian: گلوجه محمدخان, also Romanized as Golūjeh-ye Moḩammad Khān) is a village in Qaranqu Rural District, in the Central District of Hashtrud County, East Azerbaijan Province, Iran. At the 2006 census, its population was 235, in 52 families.
