= Qeshlaq-e Khanlu =

Qeshlaq-e Khanlu قشلاق خانلو
- Village
- Location within Iran
- Coordinates: 39°08′04″N 47°26′59″E
- Country: Iran
- Province: East Azerbaijan
- County: Kaleybar
- Bakhsh: Abish Ahmad
- Rural District: Abish Ahmad

Population (2006)
  - Total: 130
- Time zone: UTC+3:30 (IRST)
  - Summer (DST): UTC+4:30 (IRDT)

Qeshlaq-e Khanlu (Persian: قشلاق خانلو, also Romanized as Qeshlāq-e Khānlū; also known as Khānlū) is a village in Abish Ahmad Rural District, Abish Ahmad District, Kaleybar County, East Azerbaijan Province, Iran. At the 2006 census, its population was 130, in 30 families.
