= Goveni, Kermanshah =

Goveni گوني
- Village
- Location within Iran
- Coordinates: 34°03′24″N 47°15′05″E
- Country: Iran
- Province: Kermanshah
- County: Kermanshah
- Bakhsh: Firuzabad
- Rural District: Sar Firuzabad

Population (2006)
  - Total: 115
- Time zone: UTC+3:30 (IRST)
  - Summer (DST): UTC+4:30 (IRDT)

Goveni (Persian: گوني, also Romanized as Govenī and Gavanī; also known as Gabani) is a village in Sar Firuzabad Rural District, Firuzabad District, Kermanshah County, Kermanshah Province, Iran. At the 2006 census, its population was 115, in 27 families.
