= Golujeh, Tabriz =

Golujeh گلوجه
- Village
- Location within Iran
- Coordinates: 38°24′23″N 46°25′05″E
- Country: Iran
- Province: East Azerbaijan
- County: Tabriz
- Bakhsh: Central
- Rural District: Esperan

Population (2006)
  - Total: 224
- Time zone: UTC+3:30 (IRST)
  - Summer (DST): UTC+4:30 (IRDT)

Golujeh (Persian: گلوجه, also Romanized as Golūjeh, Galoojeh, Galūjeh, and Gollūjeh; also known as Golūjeh Bālā, Gulūja Yukāri, Gyulyudzha-Yukhari, Kūlūjeh Yokhārī, and Kūlūjeh Yūkhārī) is a village in Esperan Rural District, in the Central District of Tabriz County, East Azerbaijan Province, Iran. At the 2006 census, its population was 224, in 67 families.
