= Golujeh-ye Olya =

Golujeh-ye Olya گلوجه عليا
- Village
- Location within Iran
- Coordinates: 37°07′19″N 47°05′43″E
- Country: Iran
- Province: East Azerbaijan
- County: Charuymaq
- Bakhsh: Central
- Rural District: Charuymaq-e Markazi

Population (2006)
  - Total: 38
- Time zone: UTC+3:30 (IRST)
  - Summer (DST): UTC+4:30 (IRDT)

Golujeh-ye Olya (Persian: گلوجه عليا, also Romanized as Golūjeh-ye ‘Olyā) is a village in Charuymaq-e Markazi Rural District, in the Central District of Charuymaq County, East Azerbaijan Province, Iran. At the 2006 census, its population was 38, in 7 families.
