= Qezel Uzan Rural District =

Rural district in East Azerbaijan province, Iran

Qezel Uzan Rural District Persian: دهستان قزل اوزن
- Rural District
- Location within Iran
- Coordinates: 37°10′N 47°40′E
- Country: Iran
- Province: East Azerbaijan
- County: Mianeh
- District: Central
- Established: 1990
- Capital: Quyujaq

Population (2016)
  - Total: 2,617
- Time zone: UTC+3:30 (IRST)

Qezel Uzan Rural District (Persian: دهستان قزل اوزن) is in the Central District of Mianeh County, East Azerbaijan province, Iran. Its capital is the village of Quyujaq.

== Demographics ==
=== Population ===
At the time of the 2006 National Census, the rural district's population was 2,958 in 571 households. There were 2,673 inhabitants in 683 households at the following census of 2011. The 2016 census measured the population of the rural district as 2,617 in 731 households. The most populous of its 15 villages was Dadlu, with 658 people.

=== Other villages in the rural district ===
- Bulanliq
- Hallaj-e Olya
- Hallaj-e Sofla
