= Qaflankuh-e Gharbi Rural District =

Rural district in East Azerbaijan province, Iran

Qaflankuh-e Gharbi Rural District Persian: دهستان قافلانكوه غربي
- Rural District
- Location within Iran
- Coordinates: 37°19′N 47°46′E
- Country: Iran
- Province: East Azerbaijan
- County: Mianeh
- District: Central
- Established: 1987
- Capital: Achachi

Population (2016)
  - Total: 7,372
- Time zone: UTC+3:30 (IRST)

Qaflankuh-e Gharbi Rural District (Persian: دهستان قافلانكوه غربي) is in the Central District of Mianeh County, East Azerbaijan province, Iran. It is administered from the city of Achachi.

== Demographics ==
=== Population ===
At the time of the 2006 National Census, the rural district's population was 12,166 in 2,990 households. There were 11,920 inhabitants in 3,557 households at the following census of 2011. The 2016 census measured the population of the rural district as 7,372 in 2,308 households. The most populous of its 20 villages was Eslamabad, with 2,281 people.

=== Other villages in the rural district ===
- Golujeh-ye Khaleseh
- Hasanabad
- Sabz-e Arbat. (Note: Formerly Sabz)
