= Owch Tappeh-ye Sharqi Rural District =

Rural district in East Azerbaijan province, Iran

Owch Tappeh-ye Sharqi Rural District Persian: دهستان اوچ تپه شرقي
- Rural District
- Location within Iran
- Coordinates: 37°26′N 47°33′E
- Country: Iran
- Province: East Azerbaijan
- County: Mianeh
- District: Central
- Established: 1987
- Capital: Pursekhlu

Population (2016)
  - Total: 1,843
- Time zone: UTC+3:30 (IRST)

Owch Tappeh-ye Sharqi Rural District (Persian: دهستان اوچ تپه شرقي) is in the Central District of Mianeh County, East Azerbaijan province, Iran. Its capital is the village of Pursekhlu.

== Demographics ==
=== Population ===
At the time of the 2006 National Census, the rural district's population was 2,636 in 535 households. There were 2,026 inhabitants in 526 households at the following census of 2011. The 2016 census measured the population of the rural district as 1,843 in 557 households. The most populous of its 27 villages was Gavanlu, with 337 people.

=== Other villages in the rural district ===
- Beyg Bolaghi
- Hesar Qaranqu
- Qasem Daraq
- Siah Kamar
