= Kolah Boz-e Sharqi Rural District =

Rural district in East Azerbaijan province, Iran

Kolah Boz-e Sharqi Rural District Persian: دهستان كله بوز شرقي
- Rural District
- Location within Iran
- Coordinates: 37°16′N 47°33′E
- Country: Iran
- Province: East Azerbaijan
- County: Mianeh
- District: Central
- Established: 1987
- Capital: Kangavar

Population (2016)
  - Total: 4,402
- Time zone: UTC+3:30 (IRST)

Kolah Boz-e Sharqi Rural District (Persian: دهستان كله بوز شرقي) is in the Central District of Mianeh County, East Azerbaijan province, Iran. Its capital is the village of Kangavar.

== Demographics ==
=== Population ===
At the time of the 2006 National Census, the rural district's population was 5,825 in 1,182 households. There were 5,209 inhabitants in 1,345 households at the following census of 2011. The 2016 census measured the population of the rural district as 4,402 in 1,258 households. The most populous of its 28 villages was Tavaq, with 1,961 people.

=== Other villages in the rural district ===
- Akramabad
- Galbus
- Kamarkuh
- Qarah Bolagh
