= Howmeh Rural District (Khodabandeh County) =

Rural district in Zanjan province, Iran

Howmeh Rural District Persian: دهستان حومه
- Rural District
- Location within Iran
- Coordinates: 36°07′N 48°53′E
- Country: Iran
- Province: Zanjan
- County: Khodabandeh
- District: Do Tappeh
- Established: 1986
- Capital: Aqcheh Qaya

Population (2016)
  - Total: 18,005
- Time zone: UTC+3:30 (IRST)

Howmeh Rural District (Persian: دهستان حومه) is in Do Tappeh District of Khodabandeh County, Zanjan province, Iran. Its capital is the village of Aqcheh Qaya. The previous capital of the rural district was the village of Do Tappeh-ye Sofla. (Note: Renamed Do Tappeh)

== Demographics ==
=== Population ===
At the time of the 2006 National Census, the rural district's population (as a part of the Central District) was 19,186 in 4,073 households. There were 19,592 inhabitants in 5,364 households at the following census of 2011. The 2016 census measured the population of the rural district as 18,005 in 5,256 households. The most populous of its 25 villages was Do Tappeh-ye Sofla with 4,094 people.

=== Other villages in the rural district ===
- Chopoqlu
- Dashlujeh
- Do Tappeh-ye Olya
- Qanli
- Qatar Bolaghi
- Robat
- Shahrestanak

In 2020, the rural district was separated from the district in the formation of Do Tappeh District.
