= Kolah Boz-e Gharbi Rural District =

Rural district in East Azerbaijan province, Iran

Kolah Boz-e Gharbi Rural District Persian: دهستان كله بوز غربي
- Rural District
- Location within Iran
- Coordinates: 37°18′N 47°26′E
- Country: Iran
- Province: East Azerbaijan
- County: Mianeh
- District: Central
- Established: 1987
- Capital: Bashmaq

Population (2016)
  - Total: 3,553
- Time zone: UTC+3:30 (IRST)

Kolah Boz-e Gharbi Rural District (Persian: دهستان كله بوز غربي) is in the Central District of Mianeh County, East Azerbaijan province, Iran. Its capital is the village of Bashmaq.

== Demographics ==
=== Population ===
At the time of the 2006 National Census, the rural district's population was 5,121 in 1,020 households. There were 4,107 inhabitants in 1,051 households at the following census of 2011. The 2016 census measured the population of the rural district as 3,553 in 1,006 households. The most populous of its 17 villages was Qarah Tavaraq, with 841 people.

=== Other villages in the rural district ===
- Darin Daraq
- Duzanan
- Talvar Bolaghi
- Telim Kandi
