= Do Tappeh District =

District in Zanjan province, Iran

Do Tappeh District Persian: بخش دوتپه
- District
- Location within Iran
- Coordinates: 36°07′N 48°47′E
- Country: Iran
- Province: Zanjan
- County: Khodabandeh
- Established: 2020
- Capital: Do Tappeh
- Time zone: UTC+3:30 (IRST)

Do Tappeh District (Persian: بخش دوتپه) is in Khodabandeh County, Zanjan province, Iran. Its capital is the village of Do Tappeh, whose population at the time of the 2016 National Census was 4,094 people in 1,209 households.

== History ==
In 2020, Howmeh Rural District was separated from the Central District in the formation of Do Tappeh District.

== Demographics ==
=== Administrative divisions ===
Do Tappeh District
Administrative Divisions
Howmeh RD
Tup Qarah RD
RD = Rural District
