= Garmeh-ye Jonubi Rural District =

Rural district in East Azerbaijan province, Iran

Garmeh-ye Jonubi Rural District Persian: دهستان گرمه جنوبي
- Rural District
- Location within Iran
- Coordinates: 37°32′N 47°54′E
- Country: Iran
- Province: East Azerbaijan
- County: Mianeh
- District: Central
- Established: 1987
- Capital: Gundughdi

Population (2016)
  - Total: 5,394
- Time zone: UTC+3:30 (IRST)

Garmeh-ye Jonubi Rural District (Persian: دهستان گرمه جنوبي) is in the Central District of Mianeh County, East Azerbaijan province, Iran. Its capital is the village of Gundughdi.

== Demographics ==
=== Population ===
At the time of the 2006 National Census, the rural district's population was 8,205 in 1,889 households. There were 6,331 inhabitants in 1,773 households at the following census of 2011. The 2016 census measured the population of the rural district as 5,394 in 1,826 households. The most populous of its 49 villages was Gundughdi, with 1,024 people.

=== Other villages in the rural district ===
- Cherkinlu
- Chetab-e Olya
- Khubestan
- Maman
