= Central District (Mianeh County) =

District in East Azerbaijan province, Iran

Central District (Mianeh County) Persian: بخش مرکزی شهرستان میانه
- District
- Location within Iran
- Coordinates: 37°22′N 47°41′E
- Country: Iran
- Province: East Azerbaijan
- County: Mianeh
- Capital: Mianeh

Population (2016)
  - Total: 129,600
- Time zone: UTC+3:30 (IRST)

The Central District of Mianeh County (Persian: بخش مرکزی شهرستان میانه) is in East Azerbaijan province, Iran. Its capital is the city of Mianeh.

== History ==
The village of Achachi was converted to a city in 2013.

== Demographics ==
=== Population ===
At the time of the 2006 National Census, the district's population was 126,668 in 31,418 households. The following census in 2011 counted 130,079 people in 36,137 households. The 2016 census measured the population of the district as 129,600 inhabitants in 39,924 households.

=== Administrative divisions ===
Central District (Mianeh County) Population
| Administrative Divisions | 2006 | 2011 | 2016 |
|---|---|---|---|
| Garmeh-ye Jonubi RD | 8,205 | 6,331 | 5,394 |
| Kolah Boz-e Gharbi RD | 5,121 | 4,107 | 3,553 |
| Kolah Boz-e Sharqi RD | 5,825 | 5,209 | 4,402 |
| Owch Tappeh-ye Sharqi RD | 2,636 | 2,026 | 1,843 |
| Qaflankuh-e Gharbi RD | 12,166 | 11,920 | 7,372 |
| Qezel Uzan RD | 2,958 | 2,673 | 2,617 |
| Sheykhdarabad RD | 2,372 | 2,308 | 1,799 |
| Achachi (city) | | | 3,647 |
| Mianeh (city) | 87,385 | 95,505 | 98,973 |
| Total | 126,668 | 130,079 | 129,600 |
RD = Rural District
