= Mianeh County (Iran) =

County in East Azerbaijan province, Iran

Mianeh County Persian: شهرستان میانه
- County
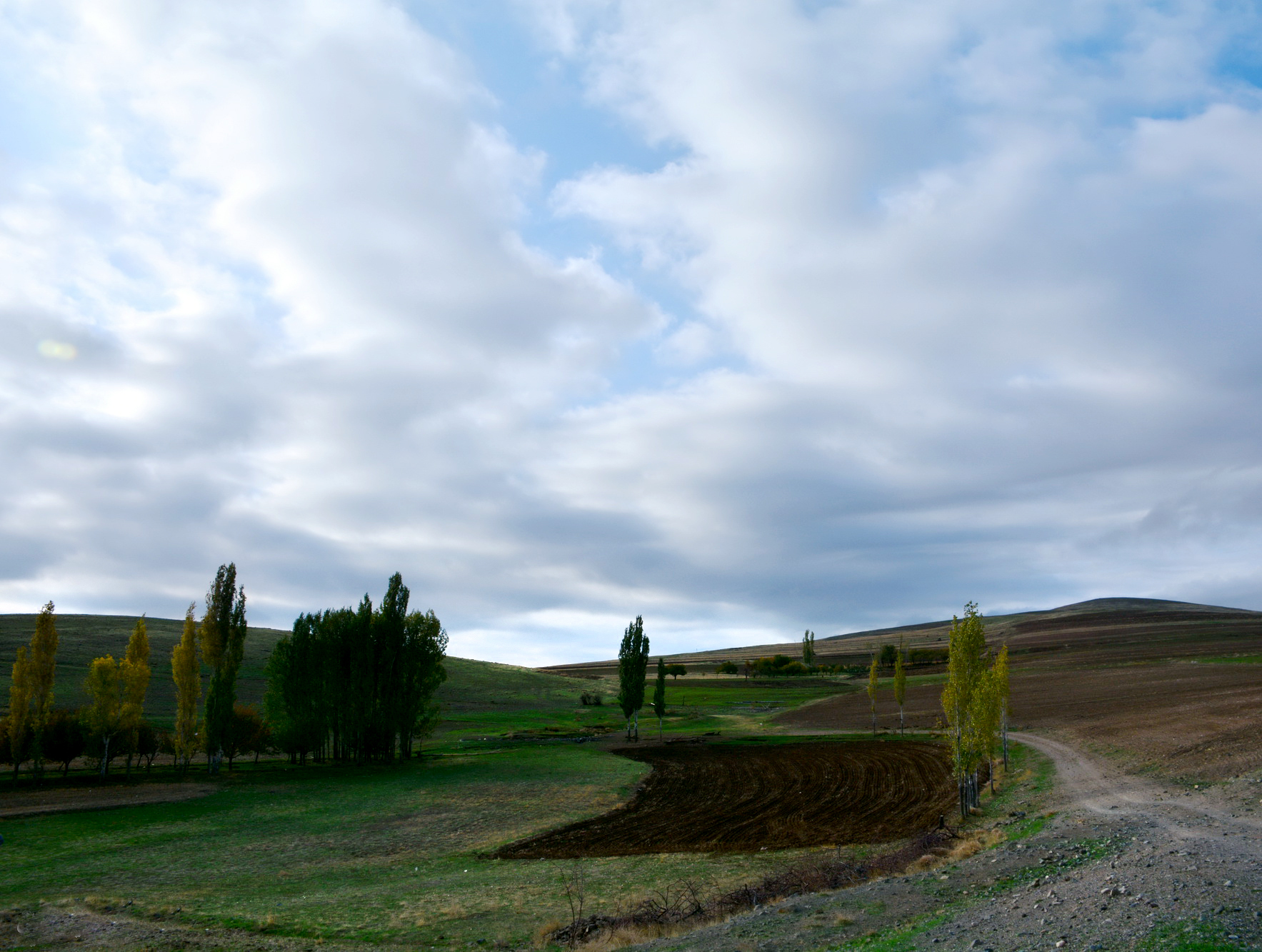
- Landscape near the village of Qomqan

- Location of Mianeh County in East Azerbaijan province (bottom right, pink)

- Location of East Azerbaijan province in Iran
- Coordinates: 37°29′N 47°48′E
- Country: Iran
- Province: East Azerbaijan
- Capital: Mianeh
- Districts: Central, Kaghazkonan, Kandovan

Population (2016)
  - Total: 182,848
- Time zone: UTC+3:30 (IRST)

Miyaneh County (Note: Persian: شهرستان میانه, romanized: Shahrestân-e Miyâne) is located in East Azerbaijan province, Iran. Its capital is the city of Mianeh.

== History ==
The city of Torkamanchay (Note: Now the capital of Torkamanchay County) is where the Treaty of Turkmenchay was signed by Russia and Iran in 1828.

The village of Achachi was converted a city in 2013. In 2024, Torkamanchay District (Note: Renamed the Central District of Torkamanchay County) was separated from the county in the establishment of Torkamanchay County and renamed the Central District.

== Demographics ==
=== Population ===
At the time of the 2006 National Census, the county's population was 187,870 in 46,469 households. The following census in 2011 counted 185,806 people in 52,630 households. The 2016 census measured the population of the county as 182,848 in 57,665 households.

=== Administrative divisions ===
Mianeh County's population history and administrative structure over three consecutive censuses are shown in the following table.

Mianeh County Population
| Administrative Divisions | 2006 | 2011 | 2016 |
|---|---|---|---|
| Central District | 126,668 | 130,079 | 129,600 |
| Garmeh-ye Jonubi RD | 8,205 | 6,331 | 5,394 |
| Kolah Boz-e Gharbi RD | 5,121 | 4,107 | 3,553 |
| Kolah Boz-e Sharqi RD | 5,825 | 5,209 | 4,402 |
| Owch Tappeh-ye Sharqi RD | 2,636 | 2,026 | 1,843 |
| Qaflankuh-e Gharbi RD | 12,166 | 11,920 | 7,372 |
| Qezel Uzan RD | 2,958 | 2,673 | 2,617 |
| Sheykhdarabad RD | 2,372 | 2,308 | 1,799 |
| Achachi (city) | | | 3,647 |
| Mianeh (city) | 87,385 | 95,505 | 98,973 |
| Kaghazkonan District | 11,101 | 9,366 | 10,729 |
| Kaghazkonan-e Markazi RD | 2,186 | 1,930 | 2,038 |
| Kaghazkonan-e Shomali RD | 3,818 | 2,959 | 3,216 |
| Qaflankuh-e Sharqi RD | 3,274 | 2,744 | 2,573 |
| Aqkand (city) | 1,823 | 1,733 | 2,902 |
| Kandovan District | 24,820 | 23,637 | 21,131 |
| Garmeh-ye Shomali RD | 7,584 | 6,645 | 5,446 |
| Kandovan RD | 8,444 | 8,487 | 7,857 |
| Tirchai RD | 6,923 | 6,099 | 5,797 |
| Tark (city) | 1,869 | 2,406 | 2,031 |
| Torkamanchay District (Note: Transferred to Torkamanchay County after the 2016 census and renamed the Central District of Torkamanchay County) | 25,281 | 22,724 | 21,387 |
| Barvanan-e Gharbi RD | 5,679 | 4,472 | 4,132 |
| Barvanan-e Markazi RD | 2,174 | 1,606 | 1,721 |
| Barvanan-e Sharqi RD | 8,304 | 7,400 | 6,356 |
| Owch Tappeh-ye Gharbi RD | 2,690 | 2,152 | 1,735 |
| Torkamanchay (city) | 6,434 | 7,094 | 7,443 |
| Total | 187,870 | 185,806 | 182,848 |
RD = Rural District

== See also ==
Media related to Mianeh County at Wikimedia Commons
