= Gol Tappeh =

Gol Tappeh (Persian: گل تپه) may refer to:

== Ardabil Province ==
- Gol Tappeh, Ardabil, village in Ardabil County
- Gol Tappeh-ye Malali, village in Ardabil County
- Gol Tappeh, Kowsar, village in Kowsar County
- Gol Tappeh, Parsabad, village in Parsabad County

== East Azerbaijan Province ==
- Gol Tappeh, Ajab Shir, village in Ajab Shir County
- Gol Tappeh, Charuymaq-e Markazi, village in Charuymaq County
- Gol Tappeh, Quri Chay-ye Sharqi, village in Charuymaq County
- Gol Tappeh, Maragheh, village in Maragheh County
- Goltappeh-ye Hasanabad, village in Meyaneh County
- Gol Tappeh-ye Kheyrabad, village in Meyaneh County

== Hamadan Province ==
- Gol Tappeh, Hamadan, village in Kabudarahang County (capital of Gol Tappeh District)
- Gol Tappeh District, administrative district in Kabudarahang County
- Gol Tappeh Rural District (Kabudarahang County), administrative unit of Gol Tappeh District

== Kermanshah Province ==
- Gol Tappeh, Kermanshah, village in Sonqor County

== Kurdistan Province ==
- Gol Tappeh-ye Taghamin, village in Bijar County
- Gol Tappeh-ye Olya, village in Divandarreh County
- Gol Tappeh-ye Sofla, village in Divandarreh County
- Gol Tappeh, Kurdistan, village in Saqqez County
- Gol Tappeh Rural District (Saqqez County), administrative unit in Saqqez County

== Markazi Province ==
- Gol Tappeh, Markazi, village in Arak County

== Tehran Province ==
- Gol Tappeh-ye Kabir, village in Ray County

== West Azerbaijan Province ==
- Gol Tappeh-ye Qurmish, village in Bukan County
- Kol Tappeh, West Azerbaijan, village in Mahabad County
- Gol Tappeh, West Azerbaijan, village in Urmia County

== Zanjan Province ==
- Gol Tappeh, Abhar, village in Abhar County
- Gol Tappeh, Khodabandeh, village in Khodabandeh County
- Gol Tappeh, alternate name of Gomesh Tappeh, Zanjan, village in Khodabandeh County
- Gol Tappeh, Zanjan, village in Zanjan County

== See also ==
- Gol Tappeh Rural District (disambiguation)
- Gültepe (disambiguation)
- Kul Tepe (disambiguation)
- Tappeh Gol (disambiguation)
