= Qarah Mohammad =

Qarah Mohammad or Qareh Mohammad (Persian: قره محمد), also rendered as Qara Mohammad or Qara Muhammad or Ghareh Mohammad or Kara-Mukhammed, may refer to:

== Places ==
- Qareh Mohammad, Kurdistan
- Qarah Mohammad, Razavi Khorasan
- Qarah Mohammad, Khodabandeh, Zanjan Province
- Qarah Mohammad, Bizineh Rud, Khodabandeh County, Zanjan Province

== Persons ==
- Qara Mahammad Töremish, a bey of Kara Koyunlu and father of Qara Yusuf.

== See also ==
- Qarah Mohammad Tappeh
