= Tappeh Goleh =

Tappeh Goleh or Tappeh Galleh (Persian: تپه گله), also rendered as Tappeh Gola or Tappeh Glaeh or Tappeh Gol or Tappeh-ye Gol, may refer to two villages in Eslamabad-e Gharb County, Kermanshah Province, Iran:

- Tappeh Goleh-ye Olya
- Tappeh Goleh-ye Sofla

== See also ==
- Gol Tappeh (disambiguation)
- Gültepe (disambiguation)
- Kul Tepe (disambiguation)
