= Gol Tappeh Rural District =

Gol Tappeh Rural District (Persian: دهستان گل تپه) may refer to:

- Gol Tappeh Rural District (Kabudarahang County), a district in Hamadan Province, Iran
- Gol Tappeh Rural District (Saqqez County), a district in Kurdistan Province, Iran

== See also ==
- Gol Tappeh (disambiguation)
- Kul Tepe (disambiguation)
- Tappeh Gol (disambiguation)
