= Pir-e Gavgol =

Village in Zanjan province, Iran

Pir-e Gavgol Persian: پيرگاوگل
- Village
- Location within Iran
- Coordinates: 35°59′26″N 48°45′35″E
- Country: Iran
- Province: Zanjan
- County: Khodabandeh
- District: Central
- Rural District: Khararud

Population (2016)
  - Total: 205
- Time zone: UTC+3:30 (IRST)

Pir-e Gavgol (Persian: پيرگاوگل) (Note: Also romanized as Pīr-e Gāvgol and Pirgāvgol; also known as Pargāvgol, Parkāgol, and Pīrgojil) is a village in Khararud Rural District of the Central District in Khodabandeh County, Zanjan province, Iran.

== Demographics ==
=== Population ===
At the time of the 2006 National Census, the village's population was 203 in 49 households. The following census in 2011 counted 234 people in 68 households. The 2016 census measured the population of the village as 205 people in 64 households.
