= Basarak =

Village in Zanjan province, Iran

Basarak Persian: بصرك
- Village
- Location within Iran
- Coordinates: 35°44′24″N 48°18′56″E
- Country: Iran
- Province: Zanjan
- County: Khodabandeh
- District: Bezineh Rud
- Rural District: Zarrineh Rud

Population (2016)
  - Total: 223
- Time zone: UTC+3:30 (IRST)

Basarak (Persian: بصرك) (Note: Also romanized as Başarak; also known as Basazak, Basrag, and Bastarak) is a village in Zarrineh Rud Rural District of Bezineh Rud District in Khodabandeh County, Zanjan province, Iran.

== Demographics ==
=== Population ===
At the time of the 2006 National Census, the village's population was 271 in 54 households. The following census in 2011 counted 274 people in 75 households. The 2016 census measured the population of the village as 223 people in 57 households.
