= Sarab, Khodabandeh =

Village in Zanjan province, Iran

Sarab Persian: سراب
- Village
- Location within Iran
- Coordinates: 35°42′09″N 48°19′16″E
- Country: Iran
- Province: Zanjan
- County: Khodabandeh
- District: Bezineh Rud
- Rural District: Zarrineh Rud

Population (2016)
  - Total: 249
- Time zone: UTC+3:30 (IRST)

Sarab (Persian: سراب) (Note: Also romanized as Sarāb; also known as Sarab Bin Rineh Rood) is a village in Zarrineh Rud Rural District of Bezineh Rud District in Khodabandeh County, Zanjan province, Iran.

== Demographics ==
=== Population ===
At the time of the 2006 National Census, the village's population was 342 in 67 households. The following census in 2011 counted 316 people in 77 households. The 2016 census measured the population of the village as 249 people in 60 households.
