= Qeynarjeh, Khodabandeh =

Village in Zanjan province, Iran

Qeynarjeh Persian: قينرجه
- Village
- Location within Iran
- Coordinates: 36°02′54″N 48°37′20″E
- Country: Iran
- Province: Zanjan
- County: Khodabandeh
- District: Central
- Rural District: Khararud

Population (2016)
  - Total: 618
- Time zone: UTC+3:30 (IRST)

Qeynarjeh (Persian: قينرجه) (Note: Also romanized as Qeynarjeh and Qīnarjeh; also known as Gaynardzhe, Ghainarjeh, Qanbarcheh, and Qīnarcheh) is a village in Khararud Rural District of the Central District in Khodabandeh County, Zanjan province, Iran.

== Demographics ==
=== Population ===
At the time of the 2006 National Census, the village's population was 597 in 121 households. The following census in 2011 counted 646 people in 166 households. The 2016 census measured the population of the village as 618 people in 167 households.
