= Qojur, Zanjan =

Village in Zanjan province, Iran

Qojur Persian: قجور
- Village
- Location within Iran
- Coordinates: 35°48′24″N 48°33′44″E
- Country: Iran
- Province: Zanjan
- County: Khodabandeh
- District: Bezineh Rud
- Rural District: Zarrineh Rud

Population (2016)
  - Total: 446
- Time zone: UTC+3:30 (IRST)

Qojur (Persian: قجور) (Note: Also romanized as Qojūr; also known as Qujur) is a village in Zarrineh Rud Rural District of Bezineh Rud District in Khodabandeh County, Zanjan province, Iran.

== Demographics ==
=== Population ===
At the time of the 2006 National Census, the village's population was 494 in 102 households. The following census in 2011 counted 452 people in 127 households. The 2016 census measured the population of the village as 446 people in 119 households.
