= Amirlu =

Village in Zanjan province, Iran

Amirlu Persian: اميرلو
- Village
- Location within Iran
- Coordinates: 35°45′45″N 48°22′27″E
- Country: Iran
- Province: Zanjan
- County: Khodabandeh
- District: Bezineh Rud
- Rural District: Zarrineh Rud

Population (2016)
  - Total: 508
- Time zone: UTC+3:30 (IRST)

Amirlu (Persian: اميرلو) (Note: Also romanized as Amir Loo and Amīrlū) is a village in Zarrineh Rud Rural District of Bezineh Rud District in Khodabandeh County, Zanjan province, Iran.

== Demographics ==
=== Population ===
At the time of the 2006 National Census, the village's population was 547 in 97 households. The following census in 2011 counted 523 people in 133 households. The 2016 census measured the population of the village as 508 people in 158 households.
