= Emam Kahriz =

Village in Zanjan province, Iran

Emam Kahriz Persian: امام كهريز
- Village
- Location within Iran
- Country: Iran
- Province: Zanjan
- County: Khodabandeh
- District: Bezineh Rud
- Rural District: Zarrineh Rud

Population (2016)
  - Total: 223
- Time zone: UTC+3:30 (IRST)

Emam Kahriz (Persian: امام كهريز) (Note: Also romanized as Emām Kahrīz) is a village in Zarrineh Rud Rural District of Bezineh Rud District in Khodabandeh County, Zanjan province, Iran.

== Demographics ==
=== Population ===
At the time of the 2006 National Census, the village's population was 225 in 43 households. The following census in 2011 counted 228 people in 49 households. The 2016 census measured the population of the village as 202 people in 66 households.
