= Darband, Zanjan =

Village in Zanjan province, Iran

Darband Persian: دربند
- Village
- Location within Iran
- Coordinates: 35°42′01″N 48°22′01″E
- Country: Iran
- Province: Zanjan
- County: Khodabandeh
- District: Bezineh Rud
- Rural District: Zarrineh Rud

Population (2016)
  - Total: 122
- Time zone: UTC+3:30 (IRST)

Darband (Persian: دربند) is a village in Zarrineh Rud Rural District of Bezineh Rud District in Khodabandeh County, Zanjan province, Iran.

== Demographics ==
=== Population ===
At the time of the 2006 National Census, the village's population was 218 in 39 households. The following census in 2011 counted 180 people in 47 households. The 2016 census measured the population of the village as 122 people in 33 households.
