= Aliabad, Khodabandeh =

Village in Zanjan province, Iran

Aliabad Persian: علي اباد
- Village
- Location within Iran
- Coordinates: 36°01′09″N 48°43′47″E
- Country: Iran
- Province: Zanjan
- County: Khodabandeh
- District: Central
- Rural District: Khararud

Population (2016)
  - Total: 555
- Time zone: UTC+3:30 (IRST)

Aliabad (Persian: علي اباد) (Note: Also romanized as ‘Alīābād) is a village in Khararud Rural District of the Central District in Khodabandeh County, Zanjan province, Iran.

== Demographics ==
=== Population ===
At the time of the 2006 National Census, the village's population was 587 in 144 households. The following census in 2011 counted 578 people in 165 households. The 2016 census measured the population of the village as 555 people in 165 households.
