= Arqin Bolagh =

Village in Zanjan province, Iran

Arqin Bolagh Persian: ارقين بلاغ
- Village
- Location within Iran
- Coordinates: 35°48′26″N 48°23′22″E
- Country: Iran
- Province: Zanjan
- County: Khodabandeh
- District: Bezineh Rud
- Rural District: Zarrineh Rud

Population (2016)
  - Total: 728
- Time zone: UTC+3:30 (IRST)

Arqin Bolagh (Persian: ارقين بلاغ) (Note: Also romanized as Arqīn Bolāgh and Ārqīn Bolāgh; also known as Ārām Bulāq and Arghīn Bolāgh) is a village in Zarrineh Rud Rural District of Bezineh Rud District in Khodabandeh County, Zanjan province, Iran.

== Demographics ==
=== Population ===
At the time of the 2006 National Census, the village's population was 954 in 204 households. The following census in 2011 counted 889 people in 259 households. The 2016 census measured the population of the village as 728 people in 217 households.
