= Kasik =

Village in Zanjan province, Iran

Kasik Persian: كسيك
- Village
- Location within Iran
- Coordinates: 35°57′12″N 48°23′08″E
- Country: Iran
- Province: Zanjan
- County: Khodabandeh
- District: Central
- Rural District: Karasf

Population (2016)
  - Total: 570
- Time zone: UTC+3:30 (IRST)

Kasik (Persian: كسيك) (Note: Also romanized as Kasīk; also known as Kāsk) is a village in Karasf Rural District (Note: Formerly Sohrevard Rural District) of the Central District in Khodabandeh County, Zanjan province, Iran.

== Demographics ==
=== Population ===
At the time of the 2006 National Census, the village's population was 530 in 115111households. The following census in 2011 counted 585 people in 137 households. The 2016 census measured the population of the village as 570 people in 157 households.
