= Sereshbar =

Village in Zanjan province, Iran

Sereshbar Persian: سرشبار
- Village
- Location within Iran
- Coordinates: 35°50′54″N 48°29′06″E
- Country: Iran
- Province: Zanjan
- County: Khodabandeh
- District: Bezineh Rud
- Rural District: Zarrineh Rud

Population (2016)
  - Total: 172
- Time zone: UTC+3:30 (IRST)

Sereshbar (Persian: سرشبار) (Note: Also romanized as Sarashbar and Sereshbār; also known as Chahārāshpar, Serīsh Bār, and Serīshbār) is a village in Zarrineh Rud Rural District of Bezineh Rud District in Khodabandeh County, Zanjan province, Iran.

== Demographics ==
=== Population ===
At the time of the 2006 National Census, the village's population was 273 in 49 households. The following census in 2011 counted 212 people in 65 households. The 2016 census measured the population of the village as 172 people in 57 households.
