= Owrganjeh =

Village in Zanjan province, Iran

Owrganjeh Persian: اورگنجه
- Village
- Location within Iran
- Coordinates: 35°48′24″N 48°43′30″E
- Country: Iran
- Province: Zanjan
- County: Khodabandeh
- District: Bezineh Rud
- Rural District: Bezineh Rud

Population (2016)
  - Total: 83
- Time zone: UTC+3:30 (IRST)

Owrganjeh (Persian: اورگنجه) (Note: Also romanized as Ūrganjeh) is a village in Bezineh Rud Rural District of Bezineh Rud District in Khodabandeh County, Zanjan province, Iran.

== Demographics ==
=== Population ===
At the time of the 2006 National Census, the village's population was 142 in 31 households. The following census in 2011 counted 118 people in 32 households. The 2016 census measured the population of the village as 83 people in 23 households.
