= Dash Alti =

Dash Alti (Persian: داش التي) may refer to:

- Dash Alti, East Azerbaijan; a village in Nazarkahrizi Rural District, Nazarkahrizi District, Hashtrud County, East Azerbaijan Province, Iran.
- Dash Alti, West Azerbaijan; a village in Baruq Rural District, Baruq District, Miandoab County, West Azerbaijan Province, Iran.
- Dash Alti, Zanjan; a village in Karasf Rural District, in the Central District of Khodabandeh County, Zanjan Province, Iran.
- Dashaltu
- Dashalty
