= Gholam Veys =

Village in Zanjan province, Iran

Gholam Veys Persian: غلام ويس
- Village
- Location within Iran
- Coordinates: 35°37′46″N 48°31′33″E
- Country: Iran
- Province: Zanjan
- County: Khodabandeh
- District: Bezineh Rud
- Rural District: Bezineh Rud

Population (2016)
  - Total: 1,686
- Time zone: UTC+3:30 (IRST)

Gholam Veys (Persian: غلام ويس) (Note: Also romanized as Gholam Veis and Gholām Veys; also known as Ghulām Raīs) is a village in Bezineh Rud Rural District of Bezineh Rud District in Khodabandeh County, Zanjan province, Iran.

== Demographics ==
=== Population ===
At the time of the 2006 National Census, the village's population was 1,735 in 343 households. The following census in 2011 counted 1,752 people in 424 households. The 2016 census measured the population of the village as 1,686 people in 522 households.
