= Bezineh Rud =

Bezineh Rud (Persian: بزینه‌رود) may refer to:

- Bezineh Rud District
- Bezineh Rud Rural District
