= Amu Kandi =

Village in Zanjan province, Iran

Amu Kandi Persian: عموكندي
- Village
- Location within Iran
- Coordinates: 35°42′55″N 48°25′00″E
- Country: Iran
- Province: Zanjan
- County: Khodabandeh
- District: Bezineh Rud
- Rural District: Zarrineh Rud

Population (2016)
  - Total: 177
- Time zone: UTC+3:30 (IRST)

Amu Kandi (Persian: عموكندي) (Note: Also romanized as ‘Amū Kandī) is a village in Zarrineh Rud Rural District of Bezineh Rud District in Khodabandeh County, Zanjan province, Iran.

== Demographics ==
=== Population ===
At the time of the 2006 National Census, the village's population was 268 in 51 households. The following census in 2011 counted 229 people in 64 households. The 2016 census measured the population of the village as 177 people in 47 households.
