= Qashqejeh =

Village in Zanjan province, Iran

Qashqejeh Persian: قشقجه
- Village
- Location within Iran
- Coordinates: 35°47′29″N 48°26′01″E
- Country: Iran
- Province: Zanjan
- County: Khodabandeh
- District: Bezineh Rud
- Rural District: Zarrineh Rud

Population (2016)
  - Total: 1,100
- Time zone: UTC+3:30 (IRST)

Qashqejeh (Persian: قشقجه) (Note: Also romanized as Qāshqejeh and Qeshqajeh; also known as Ghashghajeh) is a village in Zarrineh Rud Rural District of Bezineh Rud District in Khodabandeh County, Zanjan province, Iran.

== Demographics ==
=== Population ===
At the time of the 2006 National Census, the village's population was 1,146 in 244 households. The following census in 2011 counted 1,170 people in 307 households. The 2016 census measured the population of the village as 1,100 people in 312 households.
