= Jarin =

Village in Zanjan province, Iran

Jarin Persian: جرين
- Village
- Location within Iran
- Coordinates: 35°58′18″N 48°48′28″E
- Country: Iran
- Province: Zanjan
- County: Khodabandeh
- District: Central
- Rural District: Khararud

Population (2016)
  - Total: 1,023
- Time zone: UTC+3:30 (IRST)

Jarin (Persian: جرين) (Note: Also romanized as Jarīn; also known as Chārīn and Jahrim) is a village in Khararud Rural District of the Central District in Khodabandeh County, Zanjan province, Iran.

== Demographics ==
=== Population ===
At the time of the 2006 National Census, the village's population was 1,110 in 248 households. The following census in 2011 counted 1,063 people in 321 households. The 2016 census measured the population of the village as 1,023 people in 325 households.
