= Mohammad Khalaj =

Village in Zanjan province, Iran

Mohammad Khalaj Persian: محمدخلج
- Village
- Location within Iran
- Coordinates: 35°45′35″N 48°36′06″E
- Country: Iran
- Province: Zanjan
- County: Khodabandeh
- District: Bezineh Rud
- Rural District: Bezineh Rud

Population (2016)
  - Total: 1,518
- Time zone: UTC+3:30 (IRST)

Mohammad Khalaj (Persian: محمدخلج) (Note: Also romanized as Moḩammad Khalaj; also known as Muhammad Khalach) is a village in Bezineh Rud Rural District of Bezineh Rud District in Khodabandeh County, Zanjan province, Iran.

== Demographics ==
=== Population ===
At the time of the 2006 National Census, the village's population was 1,714 in 408 households. The following census in 2011 counted 1,675 people in 517 households. The 2016 census measured the population of the village as 1,518 people in 485 households.
