= Seqerchin, Zanjan =

Village in Zanjan province, Iran

Seqerchin Persian: سقرچين
- Village
- Location within Iran
- Coordinates: 35°51′33″N 48°36′50″E
- Country: Iran
- Province: Zanjan
- County: Khodabandeh
- District: Bezineh Rud
- Rural District: Zarrineh Rud

Population (2016)
  - Total: 479
- Time zone: UTC+3:30 (IRST)

Seqerchin (Persian: سقرچين) (Note: Also romanized as Saqarchīn and Seqerchīn) is a village in Zarrineh Rud Rural District of Bezineh Rud District in Khodabandeh County, Zanjan province, Iran.

== Demographics ==
=== Population ===
At the time of the 2006 National Census, the village's population was 736 in 172 households. The following census in 2011 counted 622 people in 188 households. The 2016 census measured the population of the village as 479 people in 156 households.
