= Sarin, Iran =

Sarin (Persian: سرئين) may refer to:

- Sarin, Kermanshah
- Sarin, Zanjan
- Sarin, alternate name of Sazin, Zanjan Province
