= Zaghehlu =

Village in Zanjan province, Iran

Zaghehlu Persian: زاغه لو
- Village
- Location within Iran
- Coordinates: 35°53′29″N 48°27′57″E
- Country: Iran
- Province: Zanjan
- County: Khodabandeh
- District: Bezineh Rud
- Rural District: Zarrineh Rud

Population (2016)
  - Total: 344
- Time zone: UTC+3:30 (IRST)

Zaghehlu (Persian: زاغه لو) (Note: Also romanized as Zāghehlū) is a village in Zarrineh Rud Rural District of Bezineh Rud District in Khodabandeh County, Zanjan province, Iran.

== Demographics ==
=== Population ===
At the time of the 2006 National Census, the village's population was 342 in 78 households. The following census in 2011 counted 335 people in 93 households. The 2016 census measured the population of the village as 344 people in 109 households.
