= Towzlu =

Village in Zanjan province, Iran

Towzlu Persian: توزلو
- Village
- Location within Iran
- Coordinates: 35°39′10″N 48°34′54″E
- Country: Iran
- Province: Zanjan
- County: Khodabandeh
- District: Bezineh Rud
- Rural District: Bezineh Rud

Population (2016)
  - Total: 2,307
- Time zone: UTC+3:30 (IRST)

Towzlu (Persian: توزلو) (Note: Also romanized as Toozloo, Towzlū, and Tūzlū; also known as Tozlū) is a village in Bezineh Rud Rural District of Bezineh Rud District in Khodabandeh County, Zanjan province, Iran.

== Demographics ==
=== Population ===
At the time of the 2006 National Census, the village's population was 2,085 in 450 households. The following census in 2011 counted 2,214 people in 623 households. The 2016 census measured the population of the village as 2,307 people in 694 households. It was the most populous village in its rural district.
