= Salehabad, Zanjan =

Village in Zanjan province, Iran

Salehabad Persian: صالح اباد
- Village
- Location within Iran
- Coordinates: 35°59′58″N 48°25′26″E
- Country: Iran
- Province: Zanjan
- County: Khodabandeh
- District: Central
- Rural District: Karasf

Population (2016)
  - Total: 236
- Time zone: UTC+3:30 (IRST)

Salehabad (Persian: صالح اباد) (Note: Also romanized as Şāleḩābād) is a village in Karasf Rural District (Note: Formerly Sohrevard Rural District) of the Central District in Khodabandeh County, Zanjan province, Iran.

== Demographics ==
=== Population ===
At the time of the 2006 National Census, the village's population was 259 in 59 households. The following census in 2011 counted 251 people in 76 households. The 2016 census measured the population of the village as 236 people in 70 households.
