= Kahla, Iran =

Village in Zanjan province, Iran

Kahla Persian: كهلا
- Village
- Location within Iran
- Coordinates: 35°40′05″N 48°40′58″E
- Country: Iran
- Province: Zanjan
- County: Khodabandeh
- District: Bezineh Rud
- Rural District: Bezineh Rud

Population (2016)
  - Total: 1,947
- Time zone: UTC+3:30 (IRST)

Kahla (Persian: كهلا) (Note: Also romanized as Kahlā; also known as Kāhīla) is a village in, and the capital of, Bezineh Rud Rural District in Bezineh Rud District of Khodabandeh County, Zanjan province, Iran.

== Demographics ==
=== Population ===
At the time of the 2006 National Census, the village's population was 1,661 in 406 households. The following census in 2011 counted 1,900 people in 525 households. The 2016 census measured the population of the village as 1,947 people in 564 households.
