= Gangak =

Village in Zanjan province, Iran

Gangak Persian: كهل اباد
- Village
- Location within Iran
- Coordinates: 35°57′31″N 48°42′33″E
- Country: Iran
- Province: Zanjan
- County: Khodabandeh
- District: Central
- Rural District: Khararud

Population (2016)
  - Total: 407
- Time zone: UTC+3:30 (IRST)

Gangak (Persian: گنگك) (Note: Also romanized as Gongak; also known as Kūīngak) is a village in Khararud Rural District of the Central District in Khodabandeh County, Zanjan province, Iran.

== Demographics ==
=== Population ===
At the time of the 2006 National Census, the village's population was 431 in 94 households. The following census in 2011 counted 440 people in 113 households. The 2016 census measured the population of the village as 407 people in 117 households.
