= Mantash =

Village in Zanjan province, Iran

Mantash Persian: منطش
- Village
- Location within Iran
- Coordinates: 35°55′03″N 48°38′22″E
- Country: Iran
- Province: Zanjan
- County: Khodabandeh
- District: Central
- Rural District: Khararud

Population (2016)
  - Total: 130
- Time zone: UTC+3:30 (IRST)

Mantash (Persian: منطش) (Note: Also romanized as Manţash) is a village in Khararud Rural District of the Central District in Khodabandeh County, Zanjan province, Iran.

== Demographics ==
=== Population ===
At the time of the 2006 National Census, the village's population was 148 in 30 households. The following census in 2011 counted 132 people in 38 households. The 2016 census measured the population of the village as 130 people in 38 households.
