= Turpakhlu =

Village in Zanjan province, Iran

Turpakhlu Persian: تورپاخلو
- Village
- Location within Iran
- Coordinates: 35°58′09″N 48°36′16″E
- Country: Iran
- Province: Zanjan
- County: Khodabandeh
- District: Central
- Rural District: Khararud

Population (2016)
  - Total: 314
- Time zone: UTC+3:30 (IRST)

Turpakhlu (Persian: تورپاخلو) (Note: Also romanized as Tūrpākhlū; also known as Tarpakhloo, Torpākhlū, Towprākhlū, and Turappaklu) is a village in Khararud Rural District of the Central District in Khodabandeh County, Zanjan province, Iran.

== Demographics ==
=== Population ===
At the time of the 2006 National Census, the village's population was 376 in 90 households. The following census in 2011 counted 376 people in 102 households. The 2016 census measured the population of the village as 314 people in 92 households.
