= Hey, Iran =

Village in Zanjan province, Iran

Hey Persian: حی
- Village
- Location within Iran
- Coordinates: 35°39′23″N 48°42′38″E
- Country: Iran
- Province: Zanjan
- County: Khodabandeh
- District: Bezineh Rud
- Rural District: Bezineh Rud

Population (2016)
  - Total: 1,318
- Time zone: UTC+3:30 (IRST)

Hey (Persian: حی) (Note: Also romanized as Ḩey; also known as Hay) is a village in Bezineh Rud Rural District of Bezineh Rud District in Khodabandeh County, Zanjan province, Iran.

== Demographics ==
=== Population ===
At the time of the 2006 National Census, the village's population was 1,355 in 311 households. The following census in 2011 counted 1,407 people in 394 households. The 2016 census measured the population of the village as 1,318 people in 404 households.
