= Shaban, Zanjan =

Village in Zanjan province, Iran

Shaban Persian: شعبان
- Village
- Location within Iran
- Coordinates: 35°50′08″N 48°41′37″E
- Country: Iran
- Province: Zanjan
- County: Khodabandeh
- District: Central
- Rural District: Khararud

Population (2016)
  - Total: 484
- Time zone: UTC+3:30 (IRST)

Shaban (Persian: شعبان) (Note: Also romanized as Sha‘bān) is a village in Khararud Rural District of the Central District in Khodabandeh County, Zanjan province, Iran.

== Demographics ==
=== Population ===
At the time of the 2006 National Census, the village's population was 528 in 109 households. The following census in 2011 counted 546 people in 138 households. The 2016 census measured the population of the village as 484 people in 132 households.
