= Dughanlu =

Village in Zanjan province, Iran

Dughanlu Persian: دوغانلو
- Village
- Location within Iran
- Coordinates: 35°59′20″N 48°21′39″E
- Country: Iran
- Province: Zanjan
- County: Khodabandeh
- District: Central
- Rural District: Karasf

Population (2016)
  - Total: 57
- Time zone: UTC+3:30 (IRST)

Dughanlu (Persian: دوغانلو) (Note: Also romanized as Dowghānlu and Dughānlū; also known as Doghanloo, Doghānlū and Dūgānlu) is a village in Karasf Rural District (Note: Formerly Sohrevard Rural District) of the Central District in Khodabandeh County, Zanjan province, Iran.

== Demographics ==
=== Population ===
At the time of the 2006 National Census, the village's population was 95 in 20 households. The following census in 2011 counted 76 people in 18 households. The 2016 census measured the population of the village as 57 people in 19 households.
