= Pir Marzban =

Village in Zanjan province, Iran

Pir Marzban Persian: پيرمرزبان
- Village
- Location within Iran
- Coordinates: 35°51′02″N 48°33′01″E
- Country: Iran
- Province: Zanjan
- County: Khodabandeh
- District: Bezineh Rud
- Rural District: Zarrineh Rud

Population (2016)
  - Total: 732
- Time zone: UTC+3:30 (IRST)

Pir Marzban (Persian: پيرمرزبان) (Note: Also romanized as Pīr Marzbān; also known as Pīr Mehzābān and Pīrmazabān) is a village in Zarrineh Rud Rural District of Bezineh Rud District in Khodabandeh County, Zanjan province, Iran.

== Demographics ==
=== Population ===
At the time of the 2006 National Census, the village's population was 776 in 174 households. The following census in 2011 counted 724 people in 209 households. The 2016 census measured the population of the village as 732 people in 206 households.
