= Kuch Tappeh =

Village in Zanjan province, Iran

Kuch Tappeh Persian: كوچ تپه
- Village
- Location within Iran
- Coordinates: 35°59′56″N 48°43′43″E
- Country: Iran
- Province: Zanjan
- County: Khodabandeh
- District: Central
- Rural District: Khararud

Population (2016)
  - Total: 994
- Time zone: UTC+3:30 (IRST)

Kuch Tappeh (Persian: كوچ تپه) (Note: Also romanized as Kūch Tappeh) is a village in Khararud Rural District of the Central District in Khodabandeh County, Zanjan province, Iran.

== Demographics ==
=== Population ===
At the time of the 2006 National Census, the village's population was 1,044 in 228 households. The following census in 2011 counted 1,100 people in 292 households. The 2016 census measured the population of the village as 994 people in 291 households.
