= Mahmudabad, Khodabandeh =

Village in Zanjan province, Iran

Mahmudabad Persian: محمودآباد
- Village
- Location within Iran
- Coordinates: 36°00′34″N 48°40′39″E
- Country: Iran
- Province: Zanjan
- County: Khodabandeh
- District: Central
- Rural District: Khararud

Population (2016)
  - Total: 2,802
- Time zone: UTC+3:30 (IRST)

Mahmudabad (Persian: محموداباد) (Note: Also romanized as Maḩmūdābād; also known as Makhmudabad) is a village in, and the capital of, Khararud Rural District in the Central District of Khodabandeh County, Zanjan province, Iran.

== Demographics ==
=== Population ===
At the time of the 2006 National Census, the village's population was 2,486 in 558 households. The following census in 2011 counted 2,906 people in 782 households. The 2016 census measured the population of the village as 2,802 people in 782 households. It was the most populous village in its rural district.
