= Owshtanian =

Village in Zanjan province, Iran

Owshtanian Persian: اوشتانيان
- Village
- Location within Iran
- Coordinates: 36°06′37″N 48°18′20″E
- Country: Iran
- Province: Zanjan
- County: Khodabandeh
- District: Central
- Rural District: Sohrevard

Population (2016)
  - Total: 26
- Time zone: UTC+3:30 (IRST)

Owshtanian (Persian: اوشتانيان) (Note: Also romanized as Owshtānīān, Ūshtāneyān, Ūshtānīān, and Ushtāniyān) is a village in Sohrevard Rural District of the Central District in Khodabandeh County, Zanjan province, Iran.

== Demographics ==
=== Population ===
At the time of the 2006 National Census, the village's population was 55 in 12 households. The following census in 2011 showed a population below the reporting threshold. The 2016 census measured the population of the village as 26 people in eight households.
