= Beygom Aqa =

Village in Zanjan province, Iran

Beygom Aqa Persian: بيگم آقا
- Village
- Location within Iran
- Coordinates: 35°54′44″N 48°29′04″E
- Country: Iran
- Province: Zanjan
- County: Khodabandeh
- District: Central
- Rural District: Karasf

Population (2016)
  - Total: 192
- Time zone: UTC+3:30 (IRST)

Beygom Aqa (Persian: بيگم آقا) (Note: Also romanized as Beygom Āqā; also known as Bagom, Bagom Āqā, Begīm Āghā, Begīm Āqā, and Pa yi Mega) is a village in Karasf Rural District (Note: Formerly Sohrevard Rural District) of the Central District in Khodabandeh County, Zanjan province, Iran.

== Demographics ==
=== Population ===
At the time of the 2006 National Census, the village's population was 287 in 54 households. The following census in 2011 counted 237 people in 68 households. The 2016 census measured the population of the village as 192 people in 66 households.
