= Kusejabad =

Village in Zanjan province, Iran

Kusejabad Persian: كوسج اباد
- Village
- Location within Iran
- Coordinates: 35°54′44″N 48°40′12″E
- Country: Iran
- Province: Zanjan
- County: Khodabandeh
- District: Central
- Rural District: Khararud

Population (2016)
  - Total: 368
- Time zone: UTC+3:30 (IRST)

Kusejabad (Persian: كوسج اباد) (Note: Also romanized as Kūsejābād) is a village in Khararud Rural District of the Central District in Khodabandeh County, Zanjan province, Iran.

== Demographics ==
=== Population ===
At the time of the 2006 National Census, the village's population was 427 in 82 households. The following census in 2011 counted 383 people in 108 households. The 2016 census measured the population of the village as 368 people in 108 households.
