= Dash Tappeh, Khodabandeh =

Village in Zanjan province, Iran

Dash Tappeh Persian: داش تپه
- Village
- Location within Iran
- Coordinates: 35°48′06″N 48°41′49″E
- Country: Iran
- Province: Zanjan
- County: Khodabandeh
- District: Bezineh Rud
- Rural District: Bezineh Rud

Population (2016)
  - Total: 81
- Time zone: UTC+3:30 (IRST)

Dash Tappeh (Persian: داش تپه) (Note: Also romanized as Dāsh Tappeh; also known as Tūsh Tepe) is a village in Bezineh Rud Rural District of Bezineh Rud District in Khodabandeh County, Zanjan province, Iran.

== Demographics ==
=== Population ===
At the time of the 2006 National Census, the village's population was 120 in 27 households. The following census in 2011 counted 114 people in 34 households. The 2016 census measured the population of the village as 81 people in 20 households.
