= Kahriz, Zanjan =

Village in Zanjan province, Iran

Kahriz Persian: كهريز
- Village
- Location within Iran
- Coordinates: 36°02′21″N 48°39′57″E
- Country: Iran
- Province: Zanjan
- County: Khodabandeh
- District: Central
- Rural District: Khararud

Population (2016)
  - Total: 231
- Time zone: UTC+3:30 (IRST)

Kahriz (Persian: كهريز) (Note: Also romanized as Kahrīz; also known as Karez) is a village in Khararud Rural District of the Central District in Khodabandeh County, Zanjan province, Iran.

== Demographics ==
=== Population ===
At the time of the 2006 National Census, the village's population was 210 in 52 households. The following census in 2011 counted 222 people in 64 households. The 2016 census measured the population of the village as 231 people in 65 households.
