= Incheh-ye Khoda Bandehlu =

Village in Zanjan province, Iran

Incheh-ye Khoda Bandehlu Persian: اينچه خدابنده لو
- Village
- Location within Iran
- Coordinates: 36°00′59″N 48°38′40″E
- Country: Iran
- Province: Zanjan
- County: Khodabandeh
- District: Central
- Rural District: Khararud

Population (2016)
  - Total: 1,642
- Time zone: UTC+3:30 (IRST)

Incheh-ye Khoda Bandehlu (Persian: اينچه خدابنده لو) (Note: Also romanized as Īncheh-ye Khodā Bandehlū; also known as Aincha and Īncheh) is a village in Khararud Rural District of the Central District in Khodabandeh County, Zanjan province, Iran.

== Demographics ==
=== Population ===
At the time of the 2006 National Census, the village's population was 1,526 in 365 households. The following census in 2011 counted 1,619 people in 442 households. The 2016 census measured the population of the village as 1,642 people in 471 households.
