= Madabad, Khodabandeh =

Village in Zanjan province, Iran

Madabad Persian: ماداباد
- Village
- Location within Iran
- Coordinates: 36°07′49″N 48°27′26″E
- Country: Iran
- Province: Zanjan
- County: Khodabandeh
- District: Central
- Rural District: Sohrevard

Population (2016)
  - Total: 178
- Time zone: UTC+3:30 (IRST)

Madabad (Persian: ماداباد) (Note: Also romanized as Mādābād) is a village in Sohrevard Rural District of the Central District in Khodabandeh County, Zanjan province, Iran.

== Demographics ==
=== Population ===
At the time of the 2006 National Census, the village's population was 262 in 58 households. The following census in 2011 counted 235 people in 59 households. The 2016 census measured the population of the village as 178 people in 48 households. It was the most populous village in its rural district.
