= Saidabad, Zanjan =

Village in Zanjan province, Iran

Saidabad Persian: سعيد اباد
- Village
- Location within Iran
- Coordinates: 35°51′39″N 48°45′10″E
- Country: Iran
- Province: Zanjan
- County: Khodabandeh
- District: Central
- Rural District: Khararud

Population (2016)
  - Total: 109
- Time zone: UTC+3:30 (IRST)

Saidabad (Persian: سعيد اباد) (Note: Also romanized as Sa‘īdābād; also known as Sa‘dābād (سعد آباد)) is a village in Khararud Rural District of the Central District in Khodabandeh County, Zanjan province, Iran.

== Demographics ==
=== Population ===
At the time of the 2006 National Census, the village's population was 87 in 22 households. The following census in 2011 counted 107 people in 24 households. The 2016 census measured the population of the village as 109 people in 32 households.
