= Zarrin Gol, Zanjan =

Village in Zanjan province, Iran

Zarrin Gol Persian: زرين گل
- Village
- Location within Iran
- Coordinates: 36°00′05″N 48°41′56″E
- Country: Iran
- Province: Zanjan
- County: Khodabandeh
- District: Central
- Rural District: Khararud

Population (2016)
  - Total: 1,307
- Time zone: UTC+3:30 (IRST)

Zarrin Gol (Persian: زرين گل) (Note: Also romanized as Zarīn Gol and Zarrīn Gol; also known as Zaringul, Zarrīn Kol, and Zarringul) is a village in Khararud Rural District of the Central District in Khodabandeh County, Zanjan province, Iran.

== Demographics ==
=== Population ===
At the time of the 2006 National Census, the village's population was 1,402 in 291 households. The following census in 2011 counted 1,343 people in 372 households. The 2016 census measured the population of the village as 1,307 people in 381 households.
