= Qarah Kahriz, Zanjan =

Village in Zanjan province, Iran

Qarah Kahriz Persian: قره كهريز
- Village
- Location within Iran
- Coordinates: 35°44′22″N 48°24′21″E
- Country: Iran
- Province: Zanjan
- County: Khodabandeh
- District: Bezineh Rud
- Rural District: Zarrineh Rud

Population (2016)
  - Total: 505
- Time zone: UTC+3:30 (IRST)

Qarah Kahriz (Persian: قره كهريز) (Note: Also romanized as Qarah Kahrīz and Qareh Kahrīz; also known as Ghareh Kahriz and Qara Kārīz) is a village in Zarrineh Rud Rural District of Bezineh Rud District in Khodabandeh County, Zanjan province, Iran.

== Demographics ==
=== Population ===
At the time of the 2006 National Census, the village's population was 617 in 114 households. The following census in 2011 counted 542 people in 139 households. The 2016 census measured the population of the village as 505 people in 157 households.
