= Khanlar, Iran =

Village in Zanjan province, Iran

Khanlar Persian: خانلار
- Village
- Location within Iran
- Coordinates: 35°42′33″N 48°32′04″E
- Country: Iran
- Province: Zanjan
- County: Khodabandeh
- District: Bezineh Rud
- Rural District: Bezineh Rud

Population (2016)
  - Total: 175
- Time zone: UTC+3:30 (IRST)

Khanlar (Persian: خانلار) (Note: Also romanized as Khānlār) is a village in Bezineh Rud Rural District of Bezineh Rud District in Khodabandeh County, Zanjan province, Iran.

== Demographics ==
=== Language ===
The people of Khanlar speak Azerbaijani Turkic.

=== Population ===
At the time of the 2006 National Census, the village's population was 230 in 49 households. The following census in 2011 counted 173 people in 43 households. The 2016 census measured the population of the village as 175 people in 41 households.
