= Dash Bolagh, Khodabandeh =

Village in Zanjan province, Iran

Dash Bolagh Persian: داشبلاغ
- Village
- Location within Iran
- Coordinates: 35°41′03″N 48°29′11″E
- Country: Iran
- Province: Zanjan
- County: Khodabandeh
- District: Bezineh Rud
- Rural District: Zarrineh Rud

Population (2016)
  - Total: 401
- Time zone: UTC+3:30 (IRST)

Dash Bolagh (Persian: داشبلاغ) (Note: Also romanized as Dāsh Bolāgh; also known as Dāsh Būlāq) is a village in Zarrineh Rud Rural District of Bezineh Rud District in Khodabandeh County, Zanjan province, Iran.

== Demographics ==
=== Population ===
At the time of the 2006 National Census, the village's population was 446 in 84 households. The following census in 2011 counted 449 people in 101 households. The 2016 census measured the population of the village as 401 people in 100 households.
