= Aq Bolagh-e Olya, Zanjan =

Village in Zanjan province, Iran

Aq Bolagh-e Olya Persian: اقبلاغ عليا
- Village
- Location within Iran
- Coordinates: 35°57′04″N 48°43′16″E
- Country: Iran
- Province: Zanjan
- County: Khodabandeh
- District: Central
- Rural District: Khararud

Population (2016)
  - Total: 382
- Time zone: UTC+3:30 (IRST)

Aq Bolagh-e Olya (Persian: اقبلاغ عليا) (Note: Also romanized as Āq Bolāgh-e ‘Olyā; also known as Āqbolāgh) is a village in Khararud Rural District of the Central District in Khodabandeh County, Zanjan province, Iran.

== Demographics ==
=== Population ===
At the time of the 2006 National Census, the village's population was 371 in 69 households. The following census in 2011 counted 370 people in 91 households. The 2016 census measured the population of the village as 382 people in 111 households.
