= Aynajik =

Village in Zanjan province, Iran

Aynajik Persian: عين جيک
- Village
- Location within Iran
- Coordinates: 36°01′10″N 48°31′57″E
- Country: Iran
- Province: Zanjan
- County: Khodabandeh
- District: Central
- Rural District: Karasf

Population (2016)
  - Total: 820
- Time zone: UTC+3:30 (IRST)

Aynajik (Persian: عين جيک) (Note: Also romanized as Ainajek, ‘Aynajīk, ‘Eynajīk, ‘Eynejīk, and Eynjik; also known as Aynadzhek and Enjag) is a village in Karasf Rural District (Note: Formerly Sohrevard Rural District) of the Central District in Khodabandeh County, Zanjan province, Iran.

== Demographics ==
=== Population ===
At the time of the 2006 National Census, the village's population was 818 in 192 households. The following census in 2011 counted 888 people in 257 households. The 2016 census measured the population of the village as 820 people in 234 households.
