= Gushtin =

Village in Zanjan province, Iran

Gushtin Persian: گوشتين
- Village
- Location within Iran
- Coordinates: 36°07′13″N 48°23′46″E
- Country: Iran
- Province: Zanjan
- County: Khodabandeh
- District: Central
- Rural District: Sohrevard

Population (2016)
  - Total: 0
- Time zone: UTC+3:30 (IRST)

Gushtin (Persian: گوشتين) (Note: Also romanized as Gūshtīn; also known as Gushtun and Kushtān) is a village in Sohrevard Rural District of the Central District in Khodabandeh County, Zanjan province, Iran.

== Demographics ==
=== Population ===
At the time of the 2006 National Census, the village's population was 19 in five households. The village did not appear in the following census of 2011. The 2016 census measured the population of the village as zero.
