= Shahid Chomani =

Village in Zanjan province, Iran

Shahid Chomani Persian: شهيدچمني
- Village
- Location within Iran
- Coordinates: 36°00′03″N 48°27′42″E
- Country: Iran
- Province: Zanjan
- County: Khodabandeh
- District: Central
- Rural District: Karasf

Population (2016)
  - Total: 427
- Time zone: UTC+3:30 (IRST)

Shahid Chomani (Persian: شهيدچمني) (Note: Also romanized as Shahīd Chomanī) is a village in Karasf Rural District (Note: Formerly Sohrevard Rural District) of the Central District in Khodabandeh County, Zanjan province, Iran.

== Demographics ==
=== Population ===
At the time of the 2006 National Census, the village's population was 444 in 92 households. The following census in 2011 counted 458 people in 129 households. The 2016 census measured the population of the village as 427 people in 128 households.
