= Zaghej =

Village in Zanjan province, Iran

Zaghej Persian: زاغج
- Village
- Location within Iran
- Coordinates: 35°48′59″N 48°35′25″E
- Country: Iran
- Province: Zanjan
- County: Khodabandeh
- District: Bezineh Rud
- Rural District: Zarrineh Rud

Population (2016)
  - Total: 951
- Time zone: UTC+3:30 (IRST)

Zaghej (Persian: زاغج) (Note: Also romanized as Zāghej; also known as Zāgheh) is a village in Zarrineh Rud Rural District of Bezineh Rud District in Khodabandeh County, Zanjan province, Iran.

== Demographics ==
=== Population ===
At the time of the 2006 National Census, the village's population was 936 in 200 households. The following census in 2011 counted 898 people in 259 households. The 2016 census measured the population of the village as 951 people in 300 households.
