= Dalar =

Dalar can refer to:

- Ab-i-Dalar, a village in Zanjan Province, Iran
- Dalar, Armenia, a village
- Delal sauce or dalar, a condiment from Northern Iran

== See also ==
- Swedish riksdaler, a form of outdated Swedish currency
