= Dulab, Zanjan =

Village in Zanjan province, Iran

Dulab Persian: دولاب
- Village
- Location within Iran
- Coordinates: 35°56′34″N 48°37′30″E
- Country: Iran
- Province: Zanjan
- County: Khodabandeh
- District: Central
- Rural District: Khararud

Population (2016)
  - Total: 86
- Time zone: UTC+3:30 (IRST)

Dulab (Persian: دولاب) (Note: Also romanized as Doolāb, Dowlāb, and Dūlāb) is a village in Khararud Rural District of the Central District in Khodabandeh County, Zanjan province, Iran.

== Demographics ==
=== Population ===
At the time of the 2006 National Census, the village's population was 117 in 19 households. The following census in 2011 counted 109 people in 24 households. The 2016 census measured the population of the village as 86 people in 21 households.
