= Kareh Chal =

Village in Zanjan province, Iran

Kareh Chal Persian: كره چال
- Village
- Location within Iran
- Coordinates: 36°03′48″N 48°32′08″E
- Country: Iran
- Province: Zanjan
- County: Khodabandeh
- District: Central
- Rural District: Karasf

Population (2016)
  - Total: 96
- Time zone: UTC+3:30 (IRST)

Kareh Chal (Persian: كره چال) (Note: Also romanized as Kareh Chāl and Koreh Chal; also known as Kara-Chay) is a village in Karasf Rural District (Note: Formerly Sohrevard Rural District) of the Central District in Khodabandeh County, Zanjan province, Iran.

== Demographics ==
=== Population ===
At the time of the 2006 National Census, the village's population was 120 in 24 households. The following census in 2011 counted 91 people in 25 households. The 2016 census measured the population of the village as 96 people in 31 households.
