= Gavan Darreh =

Village in Zanjan province, Iran

Gavan Darreh Persian: گوندره
- Village
- Location within Iran
- Coordinates: 36°09′02″N 48°37′37″E
- Country: Iran
- Province: Zanjan
- County: Khodabandeh
- District: Central
- Rural District: Karasf

Population (2016)
  - Total: 870
- Time zone: UTC+3:30 (IRST)

Gavan Darreh (Persian: گوندره) (Note: Also romanized as Gavandareh; also known as Gevendere, Kavandaraq, Kūndareh, Kundarre, and Kundarreh) is a village in Karasf Rural District (Note: Formerly Sohrevard Rural District) of the Central District in Khodabandeh County, Zanjan province, Iran.

== Demographics ==
=== Population ===
At the time of the 2006 National Census, the village's population was 799 in 185 households, when it was in Howmeh Rural District. The following census in 2011 counted 898 people in 261 households. The 2016 census measured the population of the village as 870 people in 270 households.

In 2020, Gavin Darreh was transferred to Karasf Rural District.
