= Durakhlu =

Village in Zanjan province, Iran

Durakhlu Persian: دوراخلو
- Village
- Location within Iran
- Coordinates: 35°52′43″N 48°30′03″E
- Country: Iran
- Province: Zanjan
- County: Khodabandeh
- District: Bezineh Rud
- Rural District: Zarrineh Rud

Population (2016)
  - Total: 46
- Time zone: UTC+3:30 (IRST)

Durakhlu (Persian: دوراخلو) (Note: Also romanized as Dūrākhlū; also known as Darākhlū) is a village in Zarrineh Rud Rural District of Bezineh Rud District in Khodabandeh County, Zanjan province, Iran.

== Demographics ==
=== Population ===
At the time of the 2006 National Census, the village's population was 70 in 13 households. The following census in 2011 counted 56 people in 15 households. The 2016 census measured the population of the village as 46 people in 15 households.
