= Nazar Qoli =

Village in Zanjan province, Iran

Nazar Qoli Persian: نظرقلي
- Village
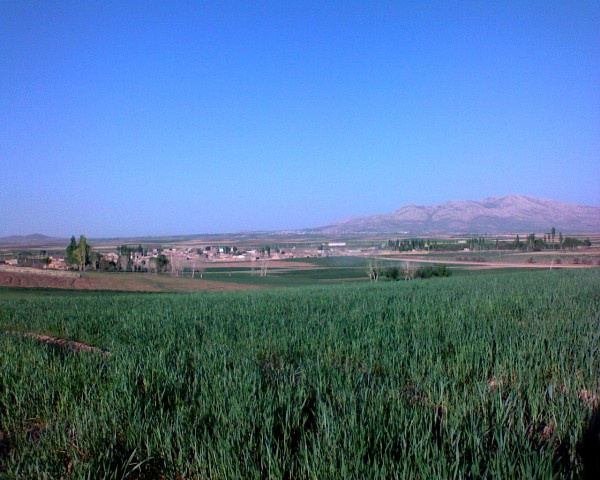
- Nazar Qoli with Mount Kedar in the background

- Location within Iran
- Coordinates: 36°09′36″N 48°40′21″E
- Country: Iran
- Province: Zanjan
- County: Khodabandeh
- District: Central
- Rural District: Karasf

Population (2016)
  - Total: 1,028
- Time zone: UTC+3:30 (IRST)

Nazar Qoli (Persian: نظرقلي) (Note: Also romanized as Naz̧ar Qolī; also known as Nazar-Kalekh and Nazar Qal‘eh) is a village in Karasf Rural District (Note: Formerly Sohrevard Rural District) of the Central District in Khodabandeh County, Zanjan province, Iran.

== Demographics ==
=== Population ===
At the time of the 2006 National Census, the village's population was 1,043 in 233 households, when it was in Howmeh Rural District. The following census in 2011 counted 1,051 people in 280 households. The 2016 census measured the population of the village as 1,028 people in 291 households.

In 2020, the Nazar Qoli was transferred to Karasf Rural District.
