= Hirabad =

Hirabad (Persian: هيراباد; Urdu: ﮨیرا آباد) may refer to:

== Places ==
=== In Iran ===
- Khalkhal (formerly Hirabad), city and capital of Khalkhal County, Ardabil Province
- Hirabad, a village in Khodabandeh County, Zanjan Province

=== In Pakistan ===
- Hirabad, a neighbourhood in the city of Hyderabad, Sindh
