= Zavajer =

Village in Zanjan province, Iran

Zavajer Persian: زواجر
- Village
- Location within Iran
- Coordinates: 36°09′27″N 48°34′59″E
- Country: Iran
- Province: Zanjan
- County: Khodabandeh
- District: Central
- Rural District: Karasf

Population (2016)
  - Total: 856
- Time zone: UTC+3:30 (IRST)

Zavajer (Persian: زواجر) (Note: Also romanized as Zavājer; also known as Zavadzhir and Zivār) is a village in Karasf Rural District (Note: Formerly Sohrevard Rural District) of the Central District in Khodabandeh County, Zanjan province, Iran.

== Demographics ==
=== Population ===
At the time of the 2006 National Census, the village's population was 808 in 198 households, when it was in Howmeh Rural District. The following census in 2011 counted 863 people in 253 households. The 2016 census measured the population of the village as 856 people in 261 households.

In 2020, Zavajer was transferred to Karasf Rural District.
