= Shahidabad, Zanjan =

Village in Zanjan province, Iran

Shahidabad Persian: شهيداباد
- Village
- Location within Iran
- Country: Iran
- Province: Zanjan
- County: Khodabandeh
- District: Bezineh Rud
- Rural District: Zarrineh Rud

Population (2016)
  - Total: 673
- Time zone: UTC+3:30 (IRST)

Shahidabad (Persian: شهيداباد) (Note: Also romanized as Shahīdābād) is a village in Zarrineh Rud Rural District of Bezineh Rud District in Khodabandeh County, Zanjan province, Iran.

== Demographics ==
=== Population ===
At the time of the 2006 National Census, the village's population was 735 in 142 households. The following census in 2011 counted 733 people in 183 households. The 2016 census measured the population of the village as 673 people in 194 households.
