= Qul Ali =

Village in Zanjan province, Iran

QulAli Persian: قلعلي
- Village
- Location within Iran
- Coordinates: 35°56′26″N 48°32′52″E
- Country: Iran
- Province: Zanjan
- County: Khodabandeh
- District: Central
- Rural District: Karasf

Population (2016)
  - Total: 190
- Time zone: UTC+3:30 (IRST)

Qul Ali (Persian: قلعلي) (Note: Also romanized as Qowl ‘Alī and Qūl ‘Alī; also known as Gholali, Gol‘alī, Kulālu, and Qol‘alī) is a village in Karasf Rural District (Note: Formerly Sohrevard Rural District) of the Central District in Khodabandeh County, Zanjan province, Iran.

== Demographics ==
=== Population ===
At the time of the 2006 National Census, the village's population was 324 in 77 households. The following census in 2011 counted 243 people in 72 households. The 2016 census measured the population of the village as 190 people in 62 households.
