= Boyuk Qeshlaq =

Village in Zanjan province, Iran

Boyuk Qeshlaq Persian: بيوک قشلاق
- Village
- Location within Iran
- Coordinates: 36°03′18″N 48°22′09″E
- Country: Iran
- Province: Zanjan
- County: Khodabandeh
- District: Central
- Rural District: Karasf

Population (2016)
  - Total: 120
- Time zone: UTC+3:30 (IRST)

Boyuk Qeshlaq (Persian: بيوک قشلاق) (Note: Also romanized as Boyūk Qeshlāq; also known as Buyik Qishlaq and Buyuk-Kishlak; Azerbaijani: Böyük Qışlaq) is a village in Karasf Rural District (Note: Formerly Sohrevard Rural District) of the Central District in Khodabandeh County, Zanjan province, Iran.

== Demographics ==
=== Population ===
At the time of the 2006 National Census, the village's population was 142 in 27 households. The following census in 2011 counted 129 people in 38 households. The 2016 census measured the population of the village as 120 people in 40 households.
