= Hesamabad, Zanjan =

Village in Zanjan province, Iran

Hesamabad Persian: حسام اباد
- Village
- Location within Iran
- Coordinates: 35°52′22″N 48°24′36″E
- Country: Iran
- Province: Zanjan
- County: Khodabandeh
- District: Bezineh Rud
- Rural District: Zarrineh Rud

Population (2016)
  - Total: 1,580
- Time zone: UTC+3:30 (IRST)

Hesamabad (Persian: حسام اباد) (Note: Also romanized as Ḩesāmābād; also known as Asmawa and Hīssamābād) is a village in Zarrineh Rud Rural District of Bezineh Rud District in Khodabandeh County, Zanjan province, Iran.

== Demographics ==
=== Population ===
At the time of the 2006 National Census, the village's population was 1,817 in 350 households. The following census in 2011 counted 1,723 people in 397 households. The 2016 census measured the population of the village as 1,580 people in 491 households. It was the most populous village in its rural district.
