= Bazin, Zanjan =

Village in Zanjan province, Iran

Bazin Persian: بزين
- Village
- Location within Iran
- Coordinates: 35°41′31″N 48°38′40″E
- Country: Iran
- Province: Zanjan
- County: Khodabandeh
- District: Bezineh Rud
- Rural District: Bezineh Rud

Population (2016)
  - Total: 1,861
- Time zone: UTC+3:30 (IRST)

Bazin (Persian: بزين) (Note: Also romanized as Bazīn, Bezīn, and Bozīn; also known as Barīn, Bīzīn, and Bīzīū) is a village in Bezineh Rud Rural District of Bezineh Rud District in Khodabandeh County, Zanjan province, Iran.

== Demographics ==
=== Population ===
At the time of the 2006 National Census, the village's population was 1,754 in 433 households. The following census in 2011 counted 1,863 people in 546 households. The 2016 census measured the population of the village as 1,861 people in 566 households.
