= Lachvan =

Village in Zanjan province, Iran

Lachvan Persian: لاچوان
- Village
- Location within Iran
- Coordinates: 36°06′23″N 48°37′33″E
- Country: Iran
- Province: Zanjan
- County: Khodabandeh
- District: Central
- Rural District: Karasf

Population (2016)
  - Total: 1,914
- Time zone: UTC+3:30 (IRST)

Lachvan (Persian: لاچوان) (Note: Also romanized as Lāchvān; also known as Lāhchwan and Pakhchvan) is a village in Karasf Rural District (Note: Formerly Sohrevard Rural District) of the Central District in Khodabandeh County, Zanjan province, Iran.

== Demographics ==
=== Population ===
At the time of the 2006 National Census, the village's population was 1,712 in 411 households, when it was in Howmeh Rural District. The following census in 2011 counted 1,987 people in 540 households. The 2016 census measured the population of the village as 1,914 people in 558 households.

In 2020, Lachvan was transferred to Karasf Rural District.
