= Panbeh Zaban =

Village in Zanjan province, Iran

Panbeh Zaban Persian: پنبه زبان
- Village
- Location within Iran
- Coordinates: 35°51′28″N 48°33′37″E
- Country: Iran
- Province: Zanjan
- County: Khodabandeh
- District: Bezineh Rud
- Rural District: Zarrineh Rud

Population (2016)
  - Total: 391
- Time zone: UTC+3:30 (IRST)

Panbeh Zaban (Persian: پنبه زبان) (Note: Also romanized as Panbeh Zabān; also known as Panbeh Zanān) is a village in Zarrineh Rud Rural District of Bezineh Rud District in Khodabandeh County, Zanjan province, Iran.

== Demographics ==
=== Population ===
At the time of the 2006 National Census, the village's population was 469 in 103 households. The following census in 2011 counted 430 people in 111 households. The 2016 census measured the population of the village as 391 people in 113 households.
