= Paskuhan =

Village in Zanjan province, Iran

Paskuhan Persian: پسكوهان
- Village
- Location within Iran
- Coordinates: 36°04′40″N 48°32′10″E
- Country: Iran
- Province: Zanjan
- County: Khodabandeh
- District: Central
- Rural District: Karasf

Population (2016)
  - Total: 1,184
- Time zone: UTC+3:30 (IRST)

Paskuhan (Persian: پسكوهان) (Note: Also romanized as Paskūhān; also known as Poshtvān, Pushtvan, and Pushtwān) is a village in Karasf Rural District (Note: Formerly Sohrevard Rural District) of the Central District in Khodabandeh County, Zanjan province, Iran.

== Demographics ==
=== Population ===
At the time of the 2006 National Census, the village's population was 1,097 in 256 households. The following census in 2011 counted 1,157 people in 328 households. The 2016 census measured the population of the village as 1,184 people in 344 households.
