= Hesar, Khodabandeh =

Village in Zanjan province, Iran

Hesar Persian: حصار
- Village
- Location within Iran
- Coordinates: 36°03′47″N 48°34′52″E
- Country: Iran
- Province: Zanjan
- County: Khodabandeh
- District: Central
- Rural District: Karasf

Population (2016)
  - Total: 1,688
- Time zone: UTC+3:30 (IRST)

Hesar (Persian: حصار) (Note: Also romanized as Ḩeşār; also known as Hisār, Hissār, and Khissar) is a village in Karasf Rural District (Note: Formerly Sohrevard Rural District) of the Central District in Khodabandeh County, Zanjan province, Iran.

== Demographics ==
=== Population ===
At the time of the 2006 National Census, the village's population was 1,437 in 361 households. The following census in 2011 counted 1,785 people in 441 households. The 2016 census measured the population of the village as 1,688 people in 479 households. It was the most populous village in its rural district.
