= Aghuzlu =

Village in Zanjan province, Iran

Aghuzlu Persian: اغوزلو
- Village
- Location within Iran
- Coordinates: 35°51′42″N 48°31′46″E
- Country: Iran
- Province: Zanjan
- County: Khodabandeh
- District: Bezineh Rud
- Rural District: Zarrineh Rud

Population (2016)
  - Total: 561
- Time zone: UTC+3:30 (IRST)

Aghuzlu (Persian: اغوزلو) (Note: Also romanized as Aghooz Loo and Āghūzlū; also known as Āqowzlū and Auqūzlu) is a village in Zarrineh Rud Rural District of Bezineh Rud District in Khodabandeh County, Zanjan province, Iran.

== Demographics ==
=== Population ===
At the time of the 2006 National Census, the village's population was 627 in 139 households. The following census in 2011 counted 581 people in 167 households. The 2016 census measured the population of the village as 561 people in 177 households.
