= Yar Ahmadlu =

Village in Zanjan province, Iran

Yar Ahmadlu Persian: ياراحمدلو
- Village
- Location within Iran
- Coordinates: 35°59′48″N 48°18′36″E
- Country: Iran
- Province: Zanjan
- County: Khodabandeh
- District: Central
- Rural District: Karasf

Population (2016)
  - Total: 99
- Time zone: UTC+3:30 (IRST)

Yar Ahmadlu (Persian: ياراحمدلو) (Note: Also romanized as Yār Aḩmadlū) is a village in Karasf Rural District (Note: Formerly Sohrevard Rural District) of the Central District in Khodabandeh County, Zanjan province, Iran.

== Demographics ==
=== Population ===
At the time of the 2006 National Census, the village's population was 141 in 29 households. The following census in 2011 counted 110 people in 32 households. The 2016 census measured the population of the village as 99 people in 32 households.
