= Qaleh Juq, Khodabandeh =

Village in Zanjan province, Iran

Qaleh Juq Persian: قلعه جوق
- Village
- Location within Iran
- Coordinates: 36°01′32″N 48°21′03″E
- Country: Iran
- Province: Zanjan
- County: Khodabandeh
- District: Central
- Rural District: Karasf

Population (2016)
  - Total: 382
- Time zone: UTC+3:30 (IRST)

Qaleh Juq (Persian: قلعه جوق) (Note: Also romanized as Qal‘eh Jūq; also known as Kaladzhukh, Qal’eh, and Qal‘eh Joq) is a village in Karasf Rural District (Note: Formerly Sohrevard Rural District) of the Central District in Khodabandeh County, Zanjan province, Iran.

== Demographics ==
=== Population ===
At the time of the 2006 National Census, the village's population was 506 in 115 households. The following census in 2011 counted 404 people in 117 households. The 2016 census measured the population of the village as 382 people in 121 households.
