= Ardhin =

Village in Zanjan province, Iran

Ardhin Persian: اردهين
- Village
- Location within Iran
- Coordinates: 35°39′22″N 48°23′18″E
- Country: Iran
- Province: Zanjan
- County: Khodabandeh
- District: Bezineh Rud
- Rural District: Zarrineh Rud

Population (2016)
  - Total: 615
- Time zone: UTC+3:30 (IRST)

Ardhin (Persian: اردهين) (Note: Also romanized as Ardahīn and Ardhīn; also known as Ardehen and Ūrd-ī-Hūn) is a village in Zarrineh Rud Rural District of Bezineh Rud District in Khodabandeh County, Zanjan province, Iran.

== Demographics ==
=== Population ===
At the time of the 2006 National Census, the village's population was 809 in 151 households. The following census in 2011 counted 822 people in 190 households. The 2016 census measured the population of the village as 615 people in 147 households.
