= Qezel Bolagh, Zanjan =

Village in Zanjan province, Iran

Qezel Bolagh Persian: قزل بلاغ
- Village
- Location within Iran
- Coordinates: 35°49′05″N 48°21′33″E
- Country: Iran
- Province: Zanjan
- County: Khodabandeh
- District: Bezineh Rud
- Rural District: Zarrineh Rud

Population (2016)
  - Total: 685
- Time zone: UTC+3:30 (IRST)

Qezel Bolagh (Persian: قزل بلاغ) (Note: Also romanized as Qezel Bolāgh; also known as Ghezel Bolagh and Qizil Bulāq) is a village in Zarrineh Rud Rural District of Bezineh Rud District in Khodabandeh County, Zanjan province, Iran.

== Demographics ==
=== Population ===
At the time of the 2006 National Census, the village's population was 682 in 143 households. The following census in 2011 counted 643 people in 180 households. The 2016 census measured the population of the village as 685 people in 205 households.
