= Qias Kandi =

Village in Zanjan province, Iran

Qias Kandi Persian: قياسكندي
- Village
- Location within Iran
- Coordinates: 35°42′05″N 48°25′59″E
- Country: Iran
- Province: Zanjan
- County: Khodabandeh
- District: Bezineh Rud
- Rural District: Zarrineh Rud

Population (2016)
  - Total: 333
- Time zone: UTC+3:30 (IRST)

Qias Kandi (Persian: قياسكندي) (Note: Also romanized as Qīās Kandī) is a village in Zarrineh Rud Rural District of Bezineh Rud District in Khodabandeh County, Zanjan province, Iran.

== Demographics ==
=== Population ===
At the time of the 2006 National Census, the village's population was 418 in 78 households. The following census in 2011 counted 399 people in 99 households. The 2016 census measured the population of the village as 333 people in 93 households.
