= Yasti Bulagh =

Village in Zanjan province, Iran

Yasti Bulagh Persian: ياستي بولاغ
- Village
- Location within Iran
- Coordinates: 35°43′30″N 48°16′47″E
- Country: Iran
- Province: Zanjan
- County: Khodabandeh
- District: Bezineh Rud
- Rural District: Zarrineh Rud

Population (2016)
  - Total: 232
- Time zone: UTC+3:30 (IRST)

Yasti Bulagh (Persian: ياستي بولاغ) (Note: Also romanized as Yāstī Būlāgh; also known as Yāstī Bolāgh and Yāsu Bulāq) is a village in Zarrineh Rud Rural District of Bezineh Rud District in Khodabandeh County, Zanjan province, Iran.

== Demographics ==
=== Population ===
At the time of the 2006 National Census, the village's population was 308 in 54 households. The following census in 2011 counted 273 people in 65 households. The 2016 census measured the population of the village as 232 people in 56 households.
