= Chopoqlu, Karasf =

Village in Zanjan province, Iran

Chopoqlu Persian: چپقلو
- Village
- Location within Iran
- Coordinates: 36°02′51″N 48°17′46″E
- Country: Iran
- Province: Zanjan
- County: Khodabandeh
- District: Central
- Rural District: Karasf

Population (2016)
  - Total: 144
- Time zone: UTC+3:30 (IRST)

Chopoqlu (Persian: چپقلو) (Note: Also romanized as Chepoqlū, Chopoqlū, and Chopoqlū; also known as Chibuklu, Chopūqlū, and Chūbūqlu) is a village in Karasf Rural District (Note: Formerly Sohrevard Rural District) of the Central District in Khodabandeh County, Zanjan province, Iran.

== Demographics ==
=== Population ===
At the time of the 2006 National Census, the village's population was 177 in 40 households. The following census in 2011 counted 177 people in 51 households. The 2016 census measured the population of the village as 144 people in 48 households.
