= Astarud =

Village in Zanjan province, Iran

Astarud Persian: استرود
- Village
- Location within Iran
- Coordinates: 35°42′21″N 48°33′28″E
- Country: Iran
- Province: Zanjan
- County: Khodabandeh
- District: Bezineh Rud
- Rural District: Bezineh Rud

Population (2016)
  - Total: 909
- Time zone: UTC+3:30 (IRST)

Astarud (Persian: استرود) (Note: Also romanized as Astarūd, Asterūd, and Esterūd) is a village in Bezineh Rud Rural District of Bezineh Rud District in Khodabandeh County, Zanjan province, Iran.

== Demographics ==
=== Population ===
At the time of the 2006 National Census, the village's population was 933 in 201 households. The following census in 2011 counted 989 people in 264 households. The 2016 census measured the population of the village as 909 people in 228 households.
