= Dalayer =

Dalayer or Dalair (Persian: دلاير) may refer to:

- Dalayer-e Olya
- Dalayer-e Sofla
