= Kahalabad =

Village in Zanjan province, Iran

Kahalabad Persian: كهل اباد
- Village
- Location within Iran
- Coordinates: 35°56′20″N 48°44′48″E
- Country: Iran
- Province: Zanjan
- County: Khodabandeh
- District: Central
- Rural District: Khararud

Population (2016)
  - Total: 520
- Time zone: UTC+3:30 (IRST)

Kahalabad (Persian: كهل اباد) (Note: Also romanized as Kahalābād; also known as Kahlā, Kahlāābād, Kahlahābād, and Kahlehābād) is a village in Khararud Rural Districtv of the Central District in Khodabandeh County, Zanjan province, Iran.

== Demographics ==
=== Population ===
At the time of the 2006 National Census, the village's population was 569 in 118 households. The following census in 2011 counted 484 people in 117 households. The 2016 census measured the population of the village as 520 people in 142 households.
