= Khaleqabad, Zanjan =

Village in Zanjan province, Iran

Khaleqabad Persian: خالق اباد
- Village
- Location within Iran
- Coordinates: 36°02′45″N 48°42′26″E
- Country: Iran
- Province: Zanjan
- County: Khodabandeh
- District: Central
- Rural District: Khararud

Population (2016)
  - Total: 870
- Time zone: UTC+3:30 (IRST)

Khaleqabad (Persian: خالق اباد) (Note: Also romanized as Khāleqābād; also known as Khalikabad) is a village in Khararud Rural District of the Central District in Khodabandeh County, Zanjan province, Iran.

== Demographics ==
=== Population ===
At the time of the 2006 National Census, the village's population was 980 in 183 households. The following census in 2011 counted 951 people in 253 households. The 2016 census measured the population of the village as 870 people in 219 households.
