= Gugjeh-ye Yeylaq =

Village in Zanjan province, Iran

Gugjeh-ye Yeylaq Persian: گوگجه ييلاق
- Village
- Location within Iran
- Coordinates: 35°55′41″N 48°34′03″E
- Country: Iran
- Province: Zanjan
- County: Khodabandeh
- District: Central
- Rural District: Khararud

Population (2016)
  - Total: 657
- Time zone: UTC+3:30 (IRST)

Gugjeh-ye Yeylaq (Persian: گوگجه ييلاق) (Note: Also romanized as Gūgjeh-ye Yeylāq; also known as Gūgjeh and Gūyjah-ye Yeylāq) is a village in Khararud Rural District of the Central District in Khodabandeh County, Zanjan province, Iran.

== Demographics ==
=== Population ===
At the time of the 2006 National Census, the village's population was 843 in 166 households. The following census in 2011 counted 746 people in 215 households. The 2016 census measured the population of the village as 657 people in 213 households.
