= Said Mohammad =

Village in Zanjan province, Iran

Said Mohammad Persian: سعيد اباد
- Village
- Location within Iran
- Coordinates: 35°51′40″N 48°43′03″E
- Country: Iran
- Province: Zanjan
- County: Khodabandeh
- District: Central
- Rural District: Khararud

Population (2016)
  - Total: 127
- Time zone: UTC+3:30 (IRST)

Said Mohammad (Persian: سعيد محمد) (Note: Also romanized as Sa‘īd Moḩammad; also known as Sayid Muhammad and Seyyed Moḩammad (سيد محمد)) is a village in Khararud Rural District of the Central District in Khodabandeh County, Zanjan province, Iran.

== Demographics ==
=== Population ===
At the time of the 2006 National Census, the village's population was 198 in 43 households. The following census in 2011 counted 159 people in 44 households. The 2016 census measured the population of the village as 127 people in 35 households.
