= Abi-ye Sofla =

Village in Zanjan province, Iran

Abi-ye Sofla Persian: ابي سفلي
- Village
- Location within Iran
- Coordinates: 36°01′49″N 48°36′18″E
- Country: Iran
- Province: Zanjan
- County: Khodabandeh
- District: Central
- Rural District: Khararud

Population (2016)
  - Total: 1,875
- Time zone: UTC+3:30 (IRST)

Abi-ye Sofla (Persian: ابي سفلي) (Note: Also romanized as Ābī-ye Soflá; also known as Ābī, Avi, and Awi) is a village in Khararud Rural District of the Central District in Khodabandeh County, Zanjan province, Iran.

== Demographics ==
=== Population ===
At the time of the 2006 National Census, the village's population was 1,768 in 400 households. The following census in 2011 counted 1,857 people in 502 households. The 2016 census measured the population of the village as 1,875 people in 515 households.
