= Sereyn =

Village in Zanjan province, Iran

Sereyn Persian: سرئين
- Village
- Location within Iran
- Coordinates: 35°44′12″N 48°31′24″E
- Country: Iran
- Province: Zanjan
- County: Khodabandeh
- District: Bezineh Rud
- Rural District: Zarrineh Rud

Population (2016)
  - Total: 317
- Time zone: UTC+3:30 (IRST)

Sereyn (Persian: سرئين) (Note: Also romanized as Sareyen, Sarīn, and Serīn; also known as Sūzīn) is a village in Zarrineh Rud Rural District of Bezineh Rud District in Khodabandeh County, Zanjan province, Iran.

== Demographics ==
=== Population ===
At the time of the 2006 National Census, the village's population was 447 in 79 households. The following census in 2011 counted 406 people in 83 households. The 2016 census measured the population of the village as 317 people in 92 households.
