= Hirabad, Zanjan =

Village in Zanjan province, Iran

Hirabad Persian: هيراباد
- Village
- Location within Iran
- Coordinates: 35°52′50″N 48°40′25″E
- Country: Iran
- Province: Zanjan
- County: Khodabandeh
- District: Central
- Rural District: Khararud

Population (2016)
  - Total: 279
- Time zone: UTC+3:30 (IRST)

Hirabad (Persian: هيراباد) (Note: Also romanized as Hīrābād) is a village in Khararud Rural District of the Central District in Khodabandeh County, Zanjan province, Iran.

== Demographics ==
=== Population ===
At the time of the 2006 National Census, the village's population was 323 in 59 households. The following census in 2011 counted 326 people in 97 households. The 2016 census measured the population of the village as 279 people in 86 households.
