= Kol Tappeh =

Kol Tappeh (Persian: كل تپه) may refer to:

- Kol Tappeh, Ardabil
- Kol Tappeh, West Azerbaijan
