= Gol Tappeh, Khodabandeh =

Village in Zanjan province, Iran

Gol Tappeh Persian: گل تپه
- Village
- Location within Iran
- Coordinates: 35°51′46″N 48°28′50″E
- Country: Iran
- Province: Zanjan
- County: Khodabandeh
- District: Bezineh Rud
- Rural District: Zarrineh Rud

Population (2016)
  - Total: 691
- Time zone: UTC+3:30 (IRST)

Gol Tappeh (Persian: گل تپه) is a village in Zarrineh Rud Rural District of Bezineh Rud District in Khodabandeh County, Zanjan province, Iran.

== Demographics ==
=== Population ===
At the time of the 2006 National Census, the village's population was 811 in 184 households. The following census in 2011 counted 811 people in 203 households. The 2016 census measured the population of the village as 691 people in 201 households.
