= Abdalar =

Village in Zanjan province, Iran

Abdalar Persian: ابدالر
- Village
- Location within Iran
- Coordinates: 36°06′08″N 48°21′26″E
- Country: Iran
- Province: Zanjan
- County: Khodabandeh
- District: Central
- Rural District: Sohrevard

Population (2016)
  - Total: 178
  - Density: 176/km^{2} (460/sq mi)
- Time zone: UTC+3:30 (IRST)

Abdalar (Persian: ابدالر) (Note: Also romanized as ‘Abd ol Lār, Ābdālār, Abdāllar, and Abdāllār; also known as ‘Abdowllār, Āb-i-Dālār, and Ebdāl Lar) is a village in Sohrevard Rural District of the Central District in Khodabandeh County, Zanjan province, Iran.

== Demographics ==
=== Population ===
At the time of the 2006 National Census, the village's population was 181 in 36 households. The following census in 2011 counted 190 people in 47 households. The 2016 census measured the population of the village as 176 people in 51 households.
