= Gomesh Tappeh, Zanjan =

Village in Zanjan province, Iran

Gomesh Tappeh Persian: گمش تپه
- Village
- Location within Iran
- Coordinates: 35°55′25″N 48°30′23″E
- Country: Iran
- Province: Zanjan
- County: Khodabandeh
- District: Central
- Rural District: Karasf

Population (2016)
  - Total: 327
- Time zone: UTC+3:30 (IRST)

Gomesh Tappeh (Persian: گمش تپه) (Note: Also known as Gol Tappeh, Gomīsh Tappeh, and Qūsh Tepe) is a village in Karasf Rural District (Note: Formerly Sohrevard Rural District) of the Central District in Khodabandeh County, Zanjan province, Iran.

== Demographics ==
=== Population ===
At the time of the 2006 National Census, the village's population was 329 in 66 households. The following census in 2011 counted 354 people in 97 households. The 2016 census measured the population of the village as 327 people in 103 households.
