= Gültepe =

Gültepe may refer to:

== People ==
- Mustafa Gültepe (born 1968), Turkish businessman

== Places ==
=== Azerbaijan ===
- Gültəpə or Qultəpə, a village and municipality in Quba Rayon

=== Turkey ===
- Gültepe, Aksaray, a village in Aksaray Province
- Gültepe, Bismil, former name of Çorapa, a neighbourhood in Diyarbakır Province
- Gültepe, Haymana, formerly Gedikli, a neighbourhood in Ankara Province
- Gültepe, Kağıthane, a neighbourhood in Istanbul Province
- Gültepe, Manavgat, a neighbourhood in Antalya Province
- Gültepe, Merkezefendi, a neighbourhood in Denizli Province
- Gültepe, Sur, a neighbourhood in Diyarbakır Province
- Gültepe Tunnel, part of the Istanbul–Ankara motorway in Kocaeli Province

== See also ==
- Gol Tappeh (disambiguation)
- Kul Tepe (disambiguation)
