= Nurbahar =

City in Zanjan province, Iran

Nurbahar Persian: نوربهار
- City
- Location within Iran
- Coordinates: 35°56′13″N 48°47′38″E
- Country: Iran
- Province: Zanjan
- County: Khodabandeh
- District: Central
- Established as a city: 2013

Population (2016)
  - Total: 3,644
- Time zone: UTC+3:30 (IRST)

Nurbahar (Persian: نوربهار) (Note: Formerly known as Nurabad (نوراباد),) is a city in the Central District of Khodabandeh County, Zanjan province, Iran.

== Demographics ==
=== Population ===
At the time of the 2006 National Census, the population was 3,260 in 699 households, when it was the village of Nurabad in Khararud Rural District. The following census in 2011 counted 3,660 people in 1,087 households. The 2016 census measured the population as 3,644 people in 1,056 households, by which time the village had been converted to the city of Nurbahar.
