= Qarah Mohammad, Bezineh Rud =

Village in Zanjan province, Iran

Qarah Mohammad Persian: قره محمد
- Village
- Location within Iran
- Coordinates: 35°43′29″N 48°29′57″E
- Country: Iran
- Province: Zanjan
- County: Khodabandeh
- District: Bezineh Rud
- Rural District: Zarrineh Rud

Population (2016)
  - Total: 206
- Time zone: UTC+3:30 (IRST)

Qarah Mohammad (Persian: قره محمد) (Note: Also romanized as Qarah Moḩammad and Qareh Moḩammad; also known as Ghareh Mohammad, Moḩammadābād, Qarā Moḩammad, and Qarāmadh) is a village in Zarrineh Rud Rural District of Bezineh Rud District in Khodabandeh County, Zanjan province, Iran.

== Demographics ==
=== Population ===
At the time of the 2006 National Census, the village's population was 283 in 50 households. The following census in 2011 counted 258 people in 61 households. The 2016 census measured the population of the village as 206 people in 49 households.
