= Sazin =

Village in Zanjan province, Iran

Sazin Persian: سازين
- Village
- Location within Iran
- Coordinates: 35°56′37″N 48°34′16″E
- Country: Iran
- Province: Zanjan
- County: Khodabandeh
- District: Central
- Rural District: Khararud

Population (2016)
  - Total: 156
- Time zone: UTC+3:30 (IRST)

Sazin (Persian: سازين) (Note: Also romanized as Sāzīn; also known as Sārīn and Sāzan) is a village in Khararud Rural District of the Central District in Khodabandeh County, Zanjan province, Iran.

== Demographics ==
=== Population ===
At the time of the 2006 National Census, the village's population was 222 in 45 households. The following census in 2011 counted 210 people in 56 households. The 2016 census measured the population of the village as 156 people in 48 households.
