= Sohrevard Rural District =

Rural district in Zanjan province, Iran

Sohrevard Rural District Persian: دهستان سهرورد
- Rural District
- Location within Iran
- Coordinates: 36°07′N 48°23′E
- Country: Iran
- Province: Zanjan
- County: Khodabandeh
- District: Central
- Established: 1994
- Capital: Sohrevard

Population (2016)
  - Total: 382
- Time zone: UTC+3:30 (IRST)

Sohrevard Rural District (Persian: دهستان سهرورد) is in the Central District of Khodabandeh County, Zanjan province, Iran. It is administered from the city of Sohrevard. The previous capital of the rural district was the village of Karasf, now a city.

== Demographics ==
=== Population ===
At the time of the 2006 National Census, the rural district's population was 6,317 in 1,472 households. There were 803 inhabitants in 203 households at the following census of 2011. The 2016 census measured the population of the rural district as 382 in 108 households. The most populous of its six villages was Madabad, with 178 people.

=== Other villages in the rural district ===
- Abdalar
- Gushtin
- Owshtanian
