= Sohrevard =

City in Zanjan province, Iran

Sohrevard Persian: سهرورد
- City
- Location within Iran
- Coordinates: 36°04′28″N 48°26′18″E
- Country: Iran
- Province: Zanjan
- County: Khodabandeh
- District: Central
- Established as a city: 2007

Population (2016)
  - Total: 6,991
- Time zone: UTC+3:30 (IRST)

Sohrevard (Persian: سهرورد) (Note: Also romanized as Sohravard) is a city in the Central District of Khodabandeh County, Zanjan province, Iran, serving as the administrative center for Sohrevard Rural District. The previous capital of the rural district was the village of Karasf, now a city.

== Etymology ==
According to Theodor Nöldeke, and later followed by Josef Marquart, the name Sohrevard was originally derived from the personal name Sohrab, so that the city's original name would have been something like Suxrāp-kart or Suhrāv-gerd. Nöldeke specifically thought the Sohrab in question was a certain governor of al-Hirah attested with this name, but there were many other known people named Sohrab and in reality the city could have been named after any one of them.

== History ==
Medieval Muslim geographers described Sohrevard as a town in the province of Jibal, located south of Soltaniyeh on the road from Hamadan to Zanjan. According to al-Istakhri, this route was the shortest route to get from Jibal to Adharbayjan and was the one usually used in peacetime; in times of political conflict, travellers took the longer route via Qazvin instead. Ibn Hawqal wrote the exact opposite about the two routes. Since Sohrevard had a cold highland climate, it did not produce much agriculturally except for grain and some smaller fruits.

In the 10th century, when Ibn Hawqal wrote, Sohrevard was a Kurdish town inhabited by Kharijites, who later mostly emigrated from the city. The walled city of Sohrevard was later destroyed by the Mongols. In the 14th century, Hamdallah Mustawfi described Sohrevard as merely a small village, with many Mongol villages also in the area.

== Demographics ==
=== Population ===
At the time of the 2006 National Census, Sohrevard's population was 5,786 in 1,356 households, when it was a village in Sohrevard Rural District. The following census in 2011 counted 6,104 people in 1,665 households, by which time the village had been converted to a city. The 2016 census measured the population of the city as 6,991 people in 1,961 households.

== Notable people ==
Sohrevard was the birthplace of the 12th-century Iranian philosopher, Shahab al-Din Suhrawardi, the Persian Sufi Abu al-Najib Suhrawardi and his nephew Shahab al-Din Abu Hafs Umar Suhrawardi (a direct descendant of Islamic Khalifa Abū Bakr as-Ṣiddīq).
