= Sharun =

Sharun may refer to:

- Corbin Sharun (b. 1988), Canadian football player
- Sharun, Iran, a village in Zanjan Province, Iran
- Sharun, Mondol (b. 2023), son of Arunesh Mondol
