= Dalayer-e Sofla =

Village in Zanjan province, Iran

Dalayer-e Sofla Persian: دلايرسفلي
- Village
- Location within Iran
- Coordinates: 35°59′05″N 48°27′51″E
- Country: Iran
- Province: Zanjan
- County: Khodabandeh
- District: Central
- Rural District: Karasf

Population (2016)
  - Total: 459
- Time zone: UTC+3:30 (IRST)

Dalayer-e Sofla (Persian: دلايرسفلي) (Note: Also romanized as Dalayer Sofla and Dalāyer-e Soflá; also known as Dālair Pāin and Dalāyer-e Pā’īn) is a village in Karasf Rural District (Note: Formerly Sohrevard Rural District) of the Central District in Khodabandeh County, Zanjan province, Iran.

== Demographics ==
=== Population ===
At the time of the 2006 National Census, the village's population was 578 in 129 households. The following census in 2011 counted 571 people in 157 households. The 2016 census measured the population of the village as 459 people in 137 households.
