= Qarah Mohammad, Khodabandeh =

Village in Zanjan province, Iran

Qarah Mohammad Persian: قره محمد
- Village
- Location within Iran
- Coordinates: 36°03′56″N 48°33′20″E
- Country: Iran
- Province: Zanjan
- County: Khodabandeh
- District: Central
- Rural District: Karasf

Population (2016)
  - Total: 630
- Time zone: UTC+3:30 (IRST)

Qarah Mohammad (Persian: قره محمد) (Note: Also romanized as Qarah Moḩammad and Qareh Moḩammad; also known as Kara-Mukhammed and Qarā Moḩammad) is a village in Karasf Rural District (Note: Formerly Sohrevard Rural District) of the Central District in Khodabandeh County, Zanjan province, Iran.

== Demographics ==
=== Population ===
At the time of the 2006 National Census, the village's population was 618 in 146 households. The following census in 2011 counted 647 people in 172 households. The 2016 census measured the population of the village as 630 people in 194 households.
