= Dalayer-e Olya =

Village in Zanjan province, Iran

Dalayer-e Olya Persian: دلايرعليا
- Village
- Location within Iran
- Coordinates: 35°57′23″N 48°31′44″E
- Country: Iran
- Province: Zanjan
- County: Khodabandeh
- District: Central
- Rural District: Karasf

Population (2016)
  - Total: 208
- Time zone: UTC+3:30 (IRST)

Dalayer-e Olya (Persian: دلايرعليا) (Note: Also romanized as Dalāyer-e 'Olyā; also known as Dalāyer-e Bālā and Dūlāir) is a village in Karasf Rural District (Note: Formerly Sohrevard Rural District) of the Central District in Khodabandeh County, Zanjan province, Iran.

== Demographics ==
=== Population ===
At the time of the 2006 National Census, the village's population was 283 in 63 households. The following census in 2011 counted 208 people in 55 households. The 2016 census measured the population of the village as 208 people in 65 households.
