= Dashaltu =

Village in Zanjan province, Iran

Dashaltu Persian: داشالتو
- Village
- Location within Iran
- Coordinates: 35°59′20″N 48°19′57″E
- Country: Iran
- Province: Zanjan
- County: Khodabandeh
- District: Central
- Rural District: Karasf

Population (2016)
  - Total: Below reporting threshold
- Time zone: UTC+3:30 (IRST)

Dashaltu (Persian: داشالتو) (Note: Also romanized as Dāsh Āltū and Dāshāltū; also known as Dāsh Āltī, Gūjeh Lūgeh, and Gūjeh Lūjeh) is a village in Karasf Rural District (Note: Formerly Sohrevard Rural District) of the Central District in Khodabandeh County, Zanjan province, Iran.

== Demographics ==
=== Population ===
At the time of the 2006 National Census, the village's population was 56 in eight households. The following census in 2011 counted 30 people in six households. The 2016 census measured the population of the village as below the reporting threshold.
