= Sharur, Iran =

Village in Zanjan province, Iran

Sharur Persian: شرور
- Village
- Location within Iran
- Coordinates: 35°42′46″N 48°35′30″E
- Country: Iran
- Province: Zanjan
- County: Khodabandeh
- District: Bezineh Rud
- Rural District: Bezineh Rud

Population (2016)
  - Total: 880
- Time zone: UTC+3:30 (IRST)

Sharur (Persian: شرور) (Note: Also romanized as Sharoor, Sharūr, and Shorūr; also known as Sharūn) is a village in Bezineh Rud Rural District of Bezineh Rud District in Khodabandeh County, Zanjan province, Iran.

== Demographics ==
=== Population ===
At the time of the 2006 National Census, the village's population was 926 in 204 households. The following census in 2011 counted 999 people in 271 households. The 2016 census measured the population of the village as 880 people in 261 households.
