= Zarrineh Rud Rural District (Khodabandeh County) =

Rural district in Zanjan province, Iran

Zarrineh Rud Rural District Persian: دهستان زرينه رود
- Rural District
- Location within Iran
- Coordinates: 35°47′N 48°28′E
- Country: Iran
- Province: Zanjan
- County: Khodabandeh
- District: Bezineh Rud
- Established: 1986
- Capital: Zarrin Rud

Population (2016)
  - Total: 13,670
- Time zone: UTC+3:30 (IRST)

Zarrineh Rud Rural District (Persian: دهستان زرينه رود) is in Bezineh Rud District of Khodabandeh County, Zanjan province, Iran. It is administered from the city of Zarrin Rud. (Note: Formerly the village of Zarrinabad)

== Demographics ==
=== Population ===
At the time of the 2006 National Census, the rural district's population was 16,067 in 3,258 households. There were 15,178 inhabitants in 3,946 households at the following census of 2011. The 2016 census measured the population of the rural district as 13,670 in 3,988 households. The most populous of its 30 villages was Hesamabad, with 1,580 people.

=== Other villages in the rural district ===
- Aghuzlu
- Amirlu
- Amu Kandi
- Ardhin
- Arqin Bolagh
- Basarak
- Darband
- Dash Bolagh
- Durakhlu
- Emam Kahriz
- Gol Tappeh
- Panbeh Zaban
- Pir Marzban
- Qarah Kahriz
- Qarah Mohammad
- Qashqejeh
- Qezel Bolagh
- Qias Kandi
- Qojur
- Sarab
- Seqerchin
- Sereshbar
- Sereyn
- Shahidabad
- Yasti Bulagh
- Zaghehlu
- Zaghej
