= Karasf Rural District =

Rural district in Zanjan province, Iran

Karasf Rural District Persian: دهستان كرسف
- Rural District
- Location within Iran
- Coordinates: 36°02′N 48°28′E
- Country: Iran
- Province: Zanjan
- County: Khodabandeh
- District: Central
- Established: 1986
- Capital: Karasf

Population (2016)
  - Total: 7,998
- Time zone: UTC+3:30 (IRST)

Karasf Rural District (Persian: دهستان كرسف) (Note: Formerly Sohrevard Rural District (دهستان سهرورد)) is in the Central District of Khodabandeh County, Zanjan province, Iran. It is administered from the city of Karasf.

== Demographics ==
=== Population ===
At the time of the 2006 National Census, the rural district's population was 11,263 in 2,655 households. There were 12,957 inhabitants in 3,546 households at the following census of 2011. The 2016 census measured the population of the rural district as 7,998 in 2,382 households. The most populous of its 27 villages was Hesar, with 1,688 people.

=== Other villages in the rural district ===
- Aynajik
- Beygom Aqa
- Boyuk Qeshlaq
- Chopoqlu
- Dalayer-e Olya
- Dalayer-e Sofla
- Dashaltu
- Dughanlu
- Ebrahimabad
- Gavan Darreh
- Gomesh Tappeh
- Kareh Chal
- Kasik
- Lachvan
- Nazar Qoli
- Paskuhan
- Qaleh Juq
- Qarah Mohammad
- Qul Ali
- Salehabad
- Shahid Chomani
- Yar Ahmadlu
- Zavajer
