= Zarrin Rud =

City in Zanjan province, Iran

Zarrin Rud Persian: زرين رود
- City
- Location within Iran
- Coordinates: 35°45′28″N 48°28′44″E
- Country: Iran
- Province: Zanjan
- County: Khodabandeh
- District: Bezineh Rud
- Established as a city: 1999

Population (2016)
  - Total: 5,664
- Time zone: UTC+3:30 (IRST)

Zarrin Rud (Persian: زرين رود) (Note: Formerly known as Zarrinabad (زرين آباد), also romanized as Zarrīnābād; also known as Zarrīn Ābād Bīnrīneh Rood and Zīrīnābād) is a city in, and the capital of, Bezineh Rud District in Khodabandeh County, Zanjan province, Iran. It also serves as the administrative center for Zarrineh Rud Rural District. The village of Zarrinabad was converted to the city of Zarrin Rud in 1999.

== Demographics ==
=== Population ===
At the time of the 2006 National Census, the city's population was 4,956 in 1,145 households. The following census in 2011 counted 5,530 people in 1,352 households. The 2016 census measured the population of the city as 5,664 people in 1,594 households.
