= Gol Tappeh-ye Olya =

Village in Kurdistan, Iran

Gol Tappeh-ye Olya گل تپه عليا
- Village
- Location within Iran
- Coordinates: 36°07′34″N 46°53′08″E
- Country: Iran
- Province: Kurdistan
- County: Divandarreh
- Bakhsh: Karaftu
- Rural District: Zarrineh

Population (2006)
  - Total: 245
- Time zone: UTC+3:30 (IRST)
  - Summer (DST): UTC+4:30 (IRDT)

Gol Tappeh-ye Olya (Persian: گل تپه عليا, also Romanized as Gol Tappeh-ye ‘Olyā; also known as Gol Tappeh) is a village in Zarrineh Rural District, Karaftu District, Divandarreh County, Kurdistan Province, Iran. At the 2006 census, its population was 245, in 44 families. The village is populated by Kurds.
