= Bezineh Rud Rural District =

Rural district in Zanjan province, Iran

Bezineh Rud Rural District Persian: دهستان بزينه رود
- Rural District
- Location within Iran
- Coordinates: 35°42′N 48°37′E
- Country: Iran
- Province: Zanjan
- County: Khodabandeh
- District: Bezineh Rud
- Established: 1986
- Capital: Kahla

Population (2016)
  - Total: 12,765
- Time zone: UTC+3:30 (IRST)

Bezineh Rud Rural District (Persian: دهستان بزينه رود) is in Bezineh Rud District of Khodabandeh County, Zanjan province, Iran. Its capital is the village of Kahla.

== Demographics ==
=== Population ===
At the time of the 2006 National Census, the rural district's population was 12,664 in 2,865 households. There were 13,209 inhabitants in 3,674 households at the following census of 2011. The 2016 census measured the population of the rural district as 12,765 in 9,390 households. The most populous of its 13 villages was Towzlu, with 2,307 people.

=== Other villages in the rural district ===
- Astarud
- Bazin
- Dash Tappeh
- Gholam Veys
- Hey
- Khanlar
- Mohammad Khalaj
- Owrganjeh
- Sharur
