= Dash Alti, East Azerbaijan =

Dash Alti داش التي
- Village
- Location within Iran
- Coordinates: 37°14′38″N 46°38′28″E
- Country: Iran
- Province: East Azerbaijan
- County: Hashtrud
- Bakhsh: Nazarkahrizi
- Rural District: Nazarkahrizi

Population (2006)
  - Total: 53
- Time zone: UTC+3:30 (IRST)
  - Summer (DST): UTC+4:30 (IRDT)

Dash Alti (Persian: داش التي, also Romanized as Dāsh Āltī) is a village in Nazarkahrizi Rural District, Nazarkahrizi District, Hashtrud County, East Azerbaijan Province, Iran. At the 2006 census, its population was 53, in 15 families.
