= Gol Tappeh, Markazi =

Gol Tappeh گل تپه
- Village
- Location within Iran
- Coordinates: 33°49′52″N 49°47′45″E
- Country: Iran
- Province: Markazi
- County: Arak
- Bakhsh: Central
- Rural District: Shamsabad

Population (2006)
  - Total: 100
- Time zone: UTC+3:30 (IRST)
  - Summer (DST): UTC+4:30 (IRDT)

Gol Tappeh (Persian: گل تپه; also known as Kul Tepe) is a village in Shamsabad Rural District, in the Central District of Arak County, Markazi Province, Iran. At the 2006 census, its population was 100, in 23 families.
