= Gol Tappeh-ye Taghamin =

Village in Kurdistan, Iran

Gol Tappeh-ye Taghamin گل تپه طغامين
- Village
- Location within Iran
- Coordinates: 36°15′15″N 47°30′47″E
- Country: Iran
- Province: Kurdistan
- County: Bijar
- Bakhsh: Korani
- Rural District: Taghamin

Population (2006)
  - Total: 260
- Time zone: UTC+3:30 (IRST)
  - Summer (DST): UTC+4:30 (IRDT)

Gol Tappeh-ye Taghamin (Persian: گل تپه طغامين, also Romanized as Gol Tappeh-ye Ţaghāmīn; also known as Goltappeh-ye Ţafāmīn and Kol Tappeh-ye Ţaqāmīn) is a village in Taghamin Rural District, Korani District, Bijar County, Kurdistan province, Iran. At the 2006 census, its population was 260, in 65 families. The village is populated by Azerbaijanis.
