= Khararud Rural District (Khodabandeh County) =

Rural district in Zanjan province, Iran

Khararud Rural District Persian: دهستان خرارود
- Rural District
- Location within Iran
- Coordinates: 35°57′N 48°41′E
- Country: Iran
- Province: Zanjan
- County: Khodabandeh
- District: Central
- Established: 1986
- Capital: Mahmudabad

Population (2016)
  - Total: 17,981
- Time zone: UTC+3:30 (IRST)

Khararud Rural District (Persian: دهستان خرارود) is in the Central District of Khodabandeh County, Zanjan province, Iran. Its capital is the village of Mahmudabad.

== Demographics ==
=== Population ===
At the time of the 2006 National Census, the rural district's population was 22,070 in 4,754 households. There were 22,634 inhabitants in 6,222 households at the following census of 2011. The 2016 census measured the population of the rural district as 17,981 in 5,107 households. The most populous of its 35 villages was Mahmudabad, with 2,802 people.

=== Other villages in the rural district ===
- Abi-ye Sofla
- Aliabad
- Aq Bolagh-e Olya
- Dulab
- Gangak
- Gugjeh-ye Yeylaq
- Hirabad
- Hoseynabad
- Incheh-ye Khoda Bandehlu
- Jarin
- Kahalabad
- Kahriz
- Khaleqaad
- Kuch Tappeh
- Kusejabad
- Mantash
- Pir-e Gavgol
- Qeynarjeh
- Said Mohammad
- Saidabad
- Sazin
- Shaban
- Turpakhlu
- Zarrin Gol
