= Gol Tappeh, Quri Chay-ye Sharqi =

Gol Tappeh گل تپه
- Village
- Location within Iran
- Coordinates: 37°08′17″N 46°45′12″E
- Country: Iran
- Province: East Azerbaijan
- County: Charuymaq
- Bakhsh: Central
- Rural District: Quri Chay-ye Sharqi

Population (2006)
  - Total: 139
- Time zone: UTC+3:30 (IRST)
  - Summer (DST): UTC+4:30 (IRDT)

Gol Tappeh (Persian: گل تپه) is a village in Quri Chay-ye Sharqi Rural District, in the Central District of Charuymaq County, East Azerbaijan Province, Iran. At the 2006 census, its population was 139, in 28 families.
