= Qarah Mohammad, Razavi Khorasan =

Qarah Mohammad قره محمد
- Village
- Country: Iran
- Province: Razavi Khorasan
- County: Mashhad
- Bakhsh: Central
- Rural District: Tabadkan

Population (2006)
  - Total: 40
- Time zone: UTC+3:30 (IRST)
  - Summer (DST): UTC+4:30 (IRDT)

Qarah Mohammad (Persian: قره محمد, also Romanized as Qarah Moḩammad) is a village in Tabadkan Rural District, in the Central District of Mashhad County, Razavi Khorasan Province, Iran. At the 2006 census, its population was 40, in 10 families.
