= Tappeh Goleh-ye Olya =

Tappeh Goleh-ye Olya تپه گله عليا
- Village
- Location within Iran
- Coordinates: 34°18′08″N 46°30′07″E
- Country: Iran
- Province: Kermanshah
- County: Eslamabad-e Gharb
- Bakhsh: Central
- Rural District: Howmeh-ye Shomali

Population (2006)
  - Total: 281
- Time zone: UTC+3:30 (IRST)
  - Summer (DST): UTC+4:30 (IRDT)

Tappeh Goleh-ye Olya (Persian: تپه گله عليا, also Romanized as Tappeh Goleh-ye ‘Olyā and Tappeh Galleh-ye ‘Olyā; also known as Tappeh Galak, Tappeh Glaeh Olya, Tappeh Golā-ye Bozorg, Tappeh Gol-e ‘Olyā, Tappeh-ye Gol, and Tappeh-ye Goleh) is a village in Howmeh-ye Shomali Rural District, in the Central District of Eslamabad-e Gharb County, Kermanshah Province, Iran. At the 2006 census, its population was 281, in 58 families.
