= Delal sauce =

Condiment from the Gilan Province of northern Iran

Dāllar (Persian: دلار) or namak sabz (Persian: نمک سبز), or green salt, is a type of condiment from Northern Iran, specifically from the Gilan Province and the Mazandaran province.

== Ingredients ==
Delal sauce is made of herbs such as cilantro, parsley and basil and is heavily salted in order to stay preserved for a longer period. It is usually spread on fresh fruits or vegetables, such as unripe green plums (Persian: گوجه سبز) and cucumbers.

Darrár is also mixed in salad dressings or mixed with olives, garlic or pomegranates.
