= Tappeh Goleh-ye Sofla =

Tappeh Goleh-ye Sofla تپه گله سفلي
- Village
- Location within Iran
- Coordinates: 34°17′44″N 46°29′57″E
- Country: Iran
- Province: Kermanshah
- County: Eslamabad-e Gharb
- Bakhsh: Central
- Rural District: Howmeh-ye Shomali

Population (2006)
  - Total: 181
- Time zone: UTC+3:30 (IRST)
  - Summer (DST): UTC+4:30 (IRDT)

Tappeh Goleh-ye Sofla (Persian: تپه گله سفلي, also Romanized as Tappeh Goleh-ye Soflá and Tappeh Galleh-ye Soflá; also known as Tappeh Goleh) is a village in Howmeh-ye Shomali Rural District, in the Central District of Eslamabad-e Gharb County, Kermanshah Province, Iran. At the 2006 census, its population was 181, in 46 families.
