= Gol Tappeh-ye Kheyrabad =

Gol Tappeh-ye Kheyrabad گل تپه خيراباد
- Village
- Location within Iran
- Coordinates: 37°12′31″N 48°07′07″E
- Country: Iran
- Province: East Azerbaijan
- County: Meyaneh
- Bakhsh: Kaghazkonan
- Rural District: Kaghazkonan-e Markazi

Population (2006)
  - Total: 88
- Time zone: UTC+3:30 (IRST)
  - Summer (DST): UTC+4:30 (IRDT)

Gol Tappeh-ye Kheyrabad (Persian: گل تپه خيراباد, also Romanized as Gol Tappeh-ye Kheyrābād; also known as Gultapah-ye Kheyrābād) is a village in Kaghazkonan-e Markazi Rural District, Kaghazkonan District, Meyaneh County, East Azerbaijan Province, Iran. At the 2006 census, its population was 88, in 29 families.
