= Gültəpə =

- Municipality
- Location within Azerbaijan
- Coordinates: 41°17′38″N 48°28′30″E
- Country: Azerbaijan
- District: Quba

Population
  - Total: 414
- Time zone: UTC+4 (AZT)
  - Summer (DST): UTC+5 (AZT)

Gültəpə (also, Gultepe) is a village and municipality in the Quba District of Azerbaijan. It has a population of 414.
