= Gol Tappeh, Kermanshah =

Gol Tappeh گل تپه
- Village
- Location within Iran
- Coordinates: 34°56′34″N 47°25′56″E
- Country: Iran
- Province: Kermanshah
- County: Sonqor
- Bakhsh: Kolyai
- Rural District: Agahan

Population (2006)
  - Total: 38
- Time zone: UTC+3:30 (IRST)
  - Summer (DST): UTC+4:30 (IRDT)

Gol Tappeh (Persian: گل تپه) is a village in Agahan Rural District, Kolyai District, Sonqor County, Kermanshah Province, Iran. At the 2006 census, its population was 38, in 12 families.
