= Gol Tappeh-ye Sofla =

Gol Tappeh-ye Sofla گل تپه سفلي
- Village
- Location within Iran
- Coordinates: 36°01′48″N 47°07′23″E
- Country: Iran
- Province: Kurdistan
- County: Divandarreh
- Bakhsh: Central
- Rural District: Qaratureh

Population (2006)
  - Total: 557
- Time zone: UTC+3:30 (IRST)
  - Summer (DST): UTC+4:30 (IRDT)

Gol Tappeh-ye Sofla (Persian: گل تپه سفلي, also Romanized as Gol Tappeh-ye Soflá; also known as Gol Tappeh) is a village in Qaratureh Rural District, in the Central District of Divandarreh County, Kurdistan Province, Iran. At the 2006 census, its population was 557, in 102 families. The village is populated by Kurds.
