= Gol Tappeh, Charuymaq-e Markazi =

Gol Tappeh گل تپه
- Village
- Location within Iran
- Coordinates: 37°11′27″N 47°01′53″E
- Country: Iran
- Province: East Azerbaijan
- County: Charuymaq
- Bakhsh: Central
- Rural District: Charuymaq-e Markazi

Population (2006)
  - Total: 177
- Time zone: UTC+3:30 (IRST)
  - Summer (DST): UTC+4:30 (IRDT)

Gol Tappeh (Persian: گل تپه) is a village in Charuymaq-e Markazi Rural District, in the Central District of Charuymaq County, East Azerbaijan Province, Iran. At the 2006 census, its population was 177, in 29 families.
