= Karasf =

City in Zanjan province, Iran

Karasf Persian: كرسف
- City
- Location within Iran
- Coordinates: 36°02′44″N 48°30′27″E
- Country: Iran
- Province: Zanjan
- County: Khodabandeh
- District: Central
- Established as a city: 2013

Population (2016)
  - Total: 3,083
- Time zone: UTC+3:30 (IRST)

Karasf (Persian: كرسف) (Note: Also romanized as Karsof; also known as Karafs and Qarasf) is a city in the Central District of Khodabandeh County, Zanjan province, Iran, serving as the administrative center for Karasf Rural District. (Note: Formerly Sohrevard Rural District)

== Demographics ==
=== Population ===
At the time of the 2006 National Census, Karasf's population was 2,869 in 753 households, when it was a village in Karasf Rural District. The following census in 2011 counted 4,381 people in 1,221 households. The 2016 census measured the population as 3,083 people in 965 households, by which time the village had been converted to a city.
