= Kul Tepe =

Kul Tepe may refer to:

- Kültəpə, Azerbaijan
- Kültepe, Turkey
- Kul Tepe Jolfa, Iran
- Gol Tappeh (disambiguation), places in Iran
