= Bezineh Rud District =

District in Zanjan province, Iran

Bezineh Rud District Persian: بخش بزینه‌ رود
- District
- Location within Iran
- Coordinates: 35°45′N 48°31′E
- Country: Iran
- Province: Zanjan
- County: Khodabandeh
- Established: 1989
- Capital: Zarrin Rud

Population (2016)
  - Total: 32,099
- Time zone: UTC+3:30 (IRST)

Bezineh Rud District (Persian: بخش بزینه‌ رود) is in Khodabandeh County, Zanjan province, Iran. Its capital is the city of Zarrin Rud. (Note: Formerly the village of Zarrinabad)

== Demographics ==
=== Population ===
At the time of the 2006 National Census, the district's population was 33,687 in 7,268 households. The following census in 2011 counted 33,917 people in 8,972 households. The 2016 census measured the population of the district as 32,099 inhabitants in 9,390 households.

=== Administrative divisions ===
Bezineh Rud District Population
Administrative Divisions	2006	2011	2016
Bezineh Rud RD	12,664	13,209	12,765
Zarrineh Rud RD	16,067	15,178	13,670
Zarrin Rud (city)	4,956	5,530	5,664
Total	33,687	33,917	32,099
RD = Rural District
