= Central District (Khodabandeh County) =

District in Zanjan province, Iran

Central District (Khodabandeh County) Persian: بخش مرکزی شهرستان خدابنده
- District
- Location within Iran
- Coordinates: 36°02′N 48°34′E
- Country: Iran
- Province: Zanjan
- County: Khodabandeh
- Capital: Qeydar

Population (2016)
  - Total: 93,005
- Time zone: UTC+3:30 (IRST)

The Central District of Khodabandeh County (Persian: بخش مرکزی شهرستان خدابنده) is in Zanjan province, Iran. Its capital is the city of Qeydar.

== History ==
The village of Sohrevard was converted to a city in 2007. The village of Karasf became a city in 2013 and the village of Nurabad rose to city status as Nurbahar in the same year.

In 2020, Howmeh Rural District was separated from the Central District in the formation of Do Tappeh District.

== Demographics ==
=== Population ===
At the time of the 2006 National Census, the district's population was 84,361 in 19,207 households. The following census in 2011 counted 92,341 people in 24,997 households. The 2016 census measured the population of the district as 93,005 inhabitants in 26,863 households.

=== Administrative divisions ===
Central District (Khodabandeh County) Population
Administrative Divisions	2006	2011	2016
Howmeh RD (Note: Transferred to Do Tappeh District after the 2016 census)	19,186	19,592	18,005
Karasf RD (Note: Formerly Sohrevard Rural District)	11,263	12,957	7,998
Khararud RD	22,070	22,634	17,981
Sohrevard RD	6,317	803	382
Karasf (city)			3,083
Nurbahar (city) (Note: Formerly the village of Nurabad)			3,644
Qeydar (city)	25,525	30,251	34,921
Sohrevard (city)		6,104	6,991
Total	84,361	92,341	93,005
RD = Rural District
