= Khodabandeh County =

County in Zanjan province, Iran

Khodabandeh County Persian: شهرستان خدابنده
- County
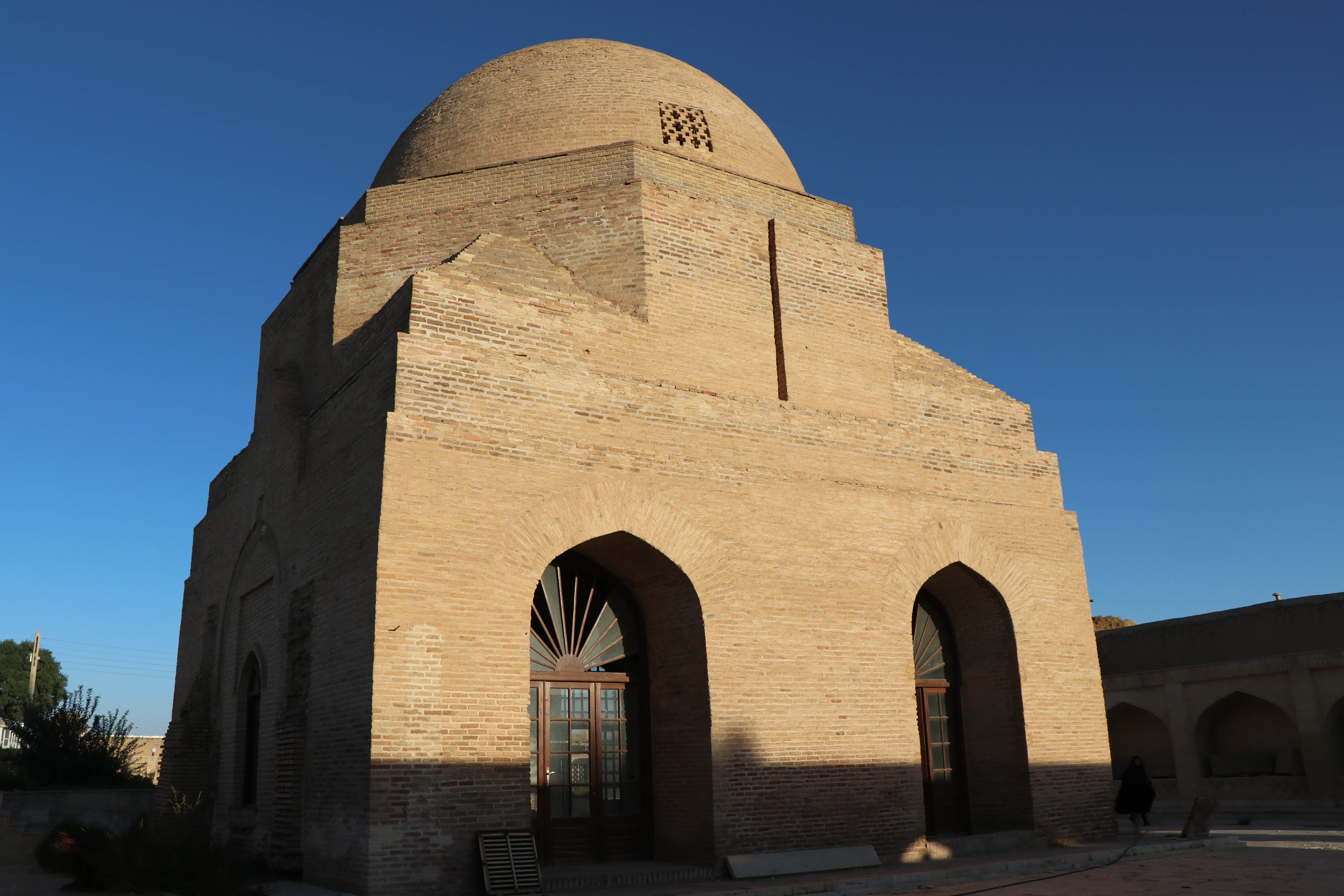
- The Grand Mosque of Sojas dates back to the Seljuk period

- Location of Khodabandeh County in Zanjan province (bottom, pink)

- Location of Zanjan province in Iran
- Coordinates: 36°00′N 48°25′E
- Country: Iran
- Province: Zanjan
- Capital: Qeydar
- Districts: Central, Afshar, Bezineh Rud, Do Tappeh, Sojas Rud

Population (2016)
  - Total: 164,493
- Time zone: UTC+3:30 (IRST)

Khodabandeh (Persian: شهرستان خدابنده) is a county in the Zanjan province, Iran. Its capital is the city of Qeydar.

== History ==
The village of Sohrevard was converted to a city in 2007. The village of Karasf became a city in 2013 and the village of Nurabad rose to city status as Nurbahar in the same year.

In 2020, Howmeh Rural District was separated from the Central District in the formation of Do Tappeh District, which was divided into two rural districts including the new Tup Qarah Rural District.

== Demographics ==
=== Population ===
At the time of the 2006 National Census, the county's population was 161,696 in 36,121 households. The following census in 2011 counted 169,553 people in 45,355 households. The 2016 census measured the population of the county as 164,493 in 47,599 households.

=== Administrative divisions ===
Khodabandeh County's population history and administrative structure over three consecutive censuses are shown in the following table.

Khodabandeh County Population
Administrative Divisions	2006	2011	2016
Central District	84,361	92,341	93,005
Howmeh RD	19,186	19,592	18,005
Karasf RD (Note: Formerly Sohrevard Rural District)	11,263	12,957	7,998
Khararud RD	22,070	22,634	17,981
Sohrevard RD	6,317	803	382
Karasf (city)			3,083
Nurbahar (city) (Note: Formerly the village of Nurabad)			3,644
Qeydar (city)	25,525	30,251	34,921
Sohrevard (city)		6,104	6,991
Afshar District	16,304	15,303	12,424
Qeshlaqat-e Afshar RD	4,067	2,813	1,823
Shivanat RD	8,963	8,469	6,778
Garmab (city)	3,274	4,021	3,823
Bezineh Rud District	33,687	33,917	32,099
Bezineh Rud RD	12,664	13,209	12,765
Zarrineh Rud RD	16,067	15,178	13,670
Zarrin Rud (city) (Note: Formerly the village of Zarrinabad)	4,956	5,530	5,664
Do Tappeh District (Note: Established after the 2016 census)			
Howmeh RD			
Tup Qarah RD			
Sojas Rud District	27,344	27,992	26,965
Aq Bolagh RD	5,996	5,757	5,228
Sojas Rud RD	15,771	15,569	14,700
Sojas (city)	5,577	6,666	7,037
Total	161,696	169,553	164,493
RD = Rural District

== See also ==
Media related to Khodabandeh County at Wikimedia Commons
