= Dowshanlu =

Village in Ardabil province, Iran

Dowshanlu Persian: دوشانلو
- Village
- Location within Iran
- Coordinates: 37°57′00″N 48°04′52″E
- Country: Iran
- Province: Ardabil
- County: Nir
- District: Kuraim
- Rural District: Yurtchi-ye Sharqi

Population (2016)
  - Total: 139
- Time zone: UTC+3:30 (IRST)

Dowshanlu (Persian: دوشانلو) (Note: Also romanized as Dowshānlū and Dushanlu; also known as Davshanly, Dowshānjaq, Dowshānjīq, Dowshānjīyeh, Dowshānlī, and Dūshānjaq) is a village in Yurtchi-ye Sharqi Rural District of Kuraim District in Nir County, Ardabil province, Iran.

== Demographics ==
=== Population ===
At the time of the 2006 National Census, the village's population was 69 in 22 households, when it was in Yurtchi-ye Gharbi Rural District. The following census in 2011 counted 114 people in 30 households. The 2016 census measured the population of the village as 139 people in 50 households.

In 2019, the rural district was transferred to the Central District and Dowshanlu was transferred to Yurtchi-ye Sharqi Rural District.
