= Qonan Qaran =

Village in Ardabil province, Iran

Qonan Qaran Persian: قناق قران
- Village
- Location within Iran
- Coordinates: 37°52′45″N 48°04′57″E
- Country: Iran
- Province: Ardabil
- County: Nir
- District: Kuraim
- Rural District: Yurtchi-ye Sharqi

Population (2016)
  - Total: 106
- Time zone: UTC+3:30 (IRST)

Qonan Qaran (Persian: قنان قران) (Note: Also romanized as Qonān Qarān; also known as Qotāq Qarān and Qownāq Qerān) is a village in Yurtchi-ye Sharqi Rural District of Kuraim District in Nir County, Ardabil province, Iran.

== Demographics ==
=== Population ===
At the time of the 2006 National Census, the village's population was 129 in 23 households, when it was in Yurtchi-ye Gharbi Rural District. The following census in 2011 counted 142 people in 43 households. The 2016 census measured the population of the village as 106 people in 30 households.

In 2019, the rural district was transferred to the Central District and Qonan Qaran was transferred to Yurtchi-ye Sharqi Rural District.
