= Said Khanlu =

Village in Ardabil province, Iran

Said Khanlu Persian: سعيدخانلو
- Village
- Location within Iran
- Coordinates: 37°54′29″N 48°04′01″E
- Country: Iran
- Province: Ardabil
- County: Nir
- District: Kuraim
- Rural District: Yurtchi-ye Sharqi

Population (2016)
  - Total: 75
- Time zone: UTC+3:30 (IRST)

Said Khanlu (Persian: سعيدخانلو) (Note: Also romanized as Sa‘īd Khānlū; also known as Sa‘īdābād and Dash Kuy (‌داش‌کوی)) is a village in Yurtchi-ye Sharqi Rural District of Kuraim District in Nir County, Ardabil province, Iran.

== Demographics ==
=== Population ===
At the time of the 2006 National Census, the village's population was 132 in 32 households, when it was in Yurtchi-ye Gharbi Rural District. The following census in 2011 counted 154 people in 43 households. The 2016 census measured the population of the village as 75 people in 24 households.

In 2019, the rural district was transferred to the Central District and Said Khanlu was transferred to Yurtchi-ye Sharqi Rural District.
