= Aqchay =

Aqchay or Aq Chay (Persian: اق چاي), also rendered as Agh Chay or Aqa Chay or Akchay or Aqchai, may refer to:

- Aqchay-e Olya, Ardabil province
- Aqchay-e Sofla, Ardabil province
- Aqchay-e Vosta, Ardabil province
- Aq Chay, Hamadan province
