= Dagmeh Daghildi =

Village in Ardabil province, Iran

Dagmeh Daghildi Persian: دگمه داغيلدي
- Village
- Location within Iran
- Coordinates: 37°54′55″N 48°05′15″E
- Country: Iran
- Province: Ardabil
- County: Nir
- District: Kuraim
- Rural District: Yurtchi-ye Sharqi

Population (2016)
  - Total: Below reporting threshold
- Time zone: UTC+3:30 (IRST)

Dagmeh Daghildi (Persian: دگمه داغيلدي) (Note: Also romanized as Dagmeh Dāghīldī; also known as Dagmeh Dāgheldī, Dagmeh Dāghīl, Dagmeh Dāghūn, Daimadaghli, Dogmeh, Dogmeh Dāghūn, Dokmah Dāghlūy, and Dokmeh Dāghīl) is a village in Yurtchi-ye Sharqi Rural District of Kuraim District in Nir County, Ardabil province, Iran.

== Demographics ==
=== Population ===
At the time of the 2006 National Census, the village's population was 28 in eight households, when it was in Yurtchi-ye Gharbi Rural District. The following census in 2011 counted 50 people in 15 households. The 2016 census measured the population of the village as below the reporting threshold.

In 2019, the rural district was transferred to the Central District and Dagmeh Daghildi was transferred to Yurtchi-ye Sharqi Rural District.
