= Jelogir, Ardabil =

Village in Ardabil province, Iran

Jelogir Persian: جلوگير
- Village
- Location within Iran
- Coordinates: 37°55′48″N 48°05′05″E
- Country: Iran
- Province: Ardabil
- County: Nir
- District: Kuraim
- Rural District: Yurtchi-ye Sharqi

Population (2016)
  - Total: 58
- Time zone: UTC+3:30 (IRST)

Jelogir (Persian: جلوگير) (Note: Also romanized as Jolowgir and Jolowgīr) is a village in Yurtchi-ye Sharqi Rural District of Kuraim District in Nir County, Ardabil province, Iran.

== Demographics ==
=== Population ===
At the time of the 2006 National Census, the village's population was 19 in six households, when it was in Yurtchi-ye Gharbi Rural District. The following census in 2011 counted 129 people in 42 households. The 2016 census measured the population of the village as 58 people in 19 households.

In 2019, the rural district was transferred to the Central District and Jelogir was transferred to Yurtchi-ye Sharqi Rural District.
