= Keriq-e Bozorg =

Village in Ardabil province, Iran

Keriq-e Bozorg Persian: كريق بزرگ
- Village
- Location within Iran
- Coordinates: 37°55′06″N 48°03′40″E
- Country: Iran
- Province: Ardabil
- County: Nir
- District: Kuraim
- Rural District: Yurtchi-ye Sharqi

Population (2016)
  - Total: 96
- Time zone: UTC+3:30 (IRST)

Keriq-e Bozorg (Persian: كريق بزرگ) (Note: Also romanized as Kerīq-e Bozorg; also known as Karan-e Bozorg, Karī Bozorg, and Karī-ye Bozorg) is a village in Yurtchi-ye Sharqi Rural District of Kuraim District in Nir County, Ardabil province, Iran.

== Demographics ==
=== Population ===
At the time of the 2006 National Census, the village's population was 163 in 39 households, when it was in Yurtchi-ye Gharbi Rural District. The following census in 2011 counted 168 people in 44 households. The 2016 census measured the population of the village as 96 people in 31 households.

In 2019, the rural district was transferred to the Central District and Keriq-e Bozorg was transferred to Yurtchi-ye Sharqi Rural District.
