= Majidabad, Nir =

Village in Ardabil province, Iran

Majidabad Persian: مجيداباد
- Village
- Location within Iran
- Coordinates: 37°54′42″N 47°57′24″E
- Country: Iran
- Province: Ardabil
- County: Nir
- District: Central
- Rural District: Yurtchi-ye Gharbi

Population (2016)
  - Total: 268
- Time zone: UTC+3:30 (IRST)

Majidabad (Persian: مجيداباد) (Note: Also romanized as Majīdābād) is a village in Yurtchi-ye Gharbi Rural District of the Central District in Nir County, Ardabil province, Iran.

== Demographics ==
=== Population ===
At the time of the 2006 National Census, the village's population was 402 in 71 households, when it was in Kuraim District. The following census in 2011 counted 386 people in 89 households. The 2016 census measured the population of the village as 268 people in 82 households.

The rural district was transferred to the Central District in 2019.
