= Mastanabad, Ardabil =

Village in Ardabil province, Iran

Mastanabad Persian: مستان اباد
- Village
- Location within Iran
- Coordinates: 37°58′42″N 47°58′56″E
- Country: Iran
- Province: Ardabil
- County: Nir
- District: Central
- Rural District: Yurtchi-ye Gharbi

Population (2016)
  - Total: 79
- Time zone: UTC+3:30 (IRST)

Mastanabad (Persian: مستان اباد) (Note: Also romanized as Mastānābād) is a village in Yurtchi-ye Gharbi Rural District of the Central District in Nir County, Ardabil province, Iran.

== Demographics ==
=== Population ===
At the time of the 2006 National Census, the village's population was 177 in 37 households, when it was in Kuraim District. The following census in 2011 counted 190 people in 60 households. The 2016 census measured the population of the village as 79 people in 22 households.

The rural district was transferred to the Central District in 2019.
