= Kur Abbaslu =

Village in Ardabil province, Iran

Kur Abbaslu Persian: كورعباسلو
- Village
- Location within Iran
- Coordinates: 37°57′17″N 48°03′32″E
- Country: Iran
- Province: Ardabil
- County: Nir
- District: Central
- Rural District: Yurtchi-ye Gharbi

Population (2016)
  - Total: 464
- Time zone: UTC+3:30 (IRST)

Kur Abbaslu (Persian: كورعباسلو) (Note: Also romanized as Kūr ‘Abbāslū) is a village in Yurtchi-ye Gharbi Rural District of the Central District in Nir County, Ardabil province, Iran.

== Demographics ==
=== Population ===
At the time of the 2006 National Census, the village's population was 185 in 71 households, when it was in Kuraim District. The following census in 2011 counted 109 people in 36 households. The 2016 census measured the population of the village as 464 people in 168 households.

The rural district was transferred to the Central District in 2019.
