= Khanom Bala Kandi =

Village in Ardabil province, Iran

Khanom Bala Kandi Persian: خانم بالاكندي
- Village
- Location within Iran
- Coordinates: 38°01′17″N 47°53′17″E
- Country: Iran
- Province: Ardabil
- County: Nir
- District: Central
- Rural District: Yurtchi-ye Gharbi

Population (2016)
  - Total: 86
- Time zone: UTC+3:30 (IRST)

Khanom Bala Kandi (Persian: خانم بالاكندي) (Note: Also romanized as Khānom Bālā Kandī; also known as Tak Bolāgh-e Qeşr) is a village in Yurtchi-ye Gharbi Rural District of the Central District in Nir County, Ardabil province, Iran.

== Demographics ==
=== Population ===
At the time of the 2006 National Census, the village's population was 101 in 24 households, when it was in Kuraim District. The following census in 2011 counted 97 people in 27 households. The 2016 census measured the population of the village as 86 people in 26 households.

The rural district was transferred to the Central District in 2019.
