= Borjelu, Nir =

Village in Ardabil province, Iran

Borjelu Persian: برجلو
- Village
- Location within Iran
- Coordinates: 38°00′45″N 47°58′12″E
- Country: Iran
- Province: Ardabil
- County: Nir
- District: Central
- Rural District: Yurtchi-ye Gharbi

Population (2016)
  - Total: 105
- Time zone: UTC+3:30 (IRST)

Borjelu (Persian: برجلو) (Note: Also romanized as Borjelū; also known as Borūjelū) is a village in Yurtchi-ye Gharbi Rural District of the Central District in Nir County, Ardabil province, Iran.

== Demographics ==
=== Population ===
At the time of the 2006 National Census, the village's population was 175 in 32 households, when it was in Kuraim District. The following census in 2011 counted 139 people in 29 households. The 2016 census measured the population of the village as 105 people in 38 households.

The rural district was transferred to the Central District in 2019.
