= Mehmandust =

Mehmandust or Mohamandust (Persian: مهماندوست), also rendered as Mihmandust, may refer to:

- Mohamandust-e Olya (disambiguation), Ardabil Province
- Mehmandust-e Sofla, Ardabil Province
- Mehmandust, East Azerbaijan
- Mehmandust, Semnan
- Mehmandust Rural District, in Ardabil Province
