= Moshtaqin =

Village in Ardabil province, Iran

Moshtaqin Persian: مشتقين
- Village
- Location within Iran
- Coordinates: 37°56′00″N 48°00′42″E
- Country: Iran
- Province: Ardabil
- County: Nir
- District: Central
- Rural District: Yurtchi-ye Gharbi

Population (2016)
  - Total: 213
- Time zone: UTC+3:30 (IRST)

Moshtaqin (Persian: مشتقين) (Note: Also romanized as Moshtaqīn; also known as Meshgīn Ḩaq, Meshgīn Ḩaqq, Meshkandzhik, Meshkanjik, Meshkīnjeq, and Meshkīnjīk) is a village in Yurtchi-ye Gharbi Rural District of the Central District in Nir County, Ardabil province, Iran.

== Demographics ==
=== Population ===
At the time of the 2006 National Census, the village's population was 319 in 76 households, when it was in Kuraim District. The following census in 2011 counted 278 people in 77 households. The 2016 census measured the population of the village as 213 people in 70 households.

The rural district was transferred to the Central District in 2019.
