= Qarah Shiran =

Village in Ardabil province, Iran

Qarah Shiran Persian: قره شيران
- Village
- Location within Iran
- Coordinates: 37°58′19″N 48°00′56″E
- Country: Iran
- Province: Ardabil
- County: Nir
- District: Central
- Rural District: Yurtchi-ye Gharbi

Population (2016)
  - Total: 491
- Time zone: UTC+3:30 (IRST)

Qarah Shiran (Persian: قره شيران) (Note: Also romanized as Qarah Shīrān and Qareh Shīrān; also known as Karashinar and Qara Chenār) is a village in, and the capital of, Yurtchi-ye Gharbi Rural District in the Central District of Nir County, Ardabil province, Iran.

== Demographics ==
=== Population ===
At the time of the 2006 National Census, the village's population was 720 in 176 households, when it was in Kuraim District. The following census in 2011 counted 617 people in 193 households. The 2016 census measured the population of the village as 491 people in 159 households. It was the most populous village in its rural district.

The rural district was transferred to the Central District in 2019.
