= Belqeysabad =

Village in Ardabil province, Iran

Belqeysabad Persian: بلقيس اباد
- Village
- Location within Iran
- Coordinates: 37°57′00″N 47°58′06″E
- Country: Iran
- Province: Ardabil
- County: Nir
- District: Central
- Rural District: Yurtchi-ye Gharbi

Population (2016)
  - Total: 75
- Time zone: UTC+3:30 (IRST)

Belqeysabad (Persian: بلقيس اباد) (Note: Also romanized as Belqeysābād; also known as Belqesābād) is a village in Yurtchi-ye Gharbi Rural District of the Central District in Nir County, Ardabil province, Iran.

== Demographics ==
=== Population ===
At the time of the 2006 National Census, the village's population was 100 in 17 households, when it was in Kuraim District. The following census in 2011 counted 83 people in 23 households. The 2016 census measured the population of the village as 75 people in 21 households.

The rural district was transferred to the Central District in 2019.
