= Chehreh Barq =

Village in Ardabil province, Iran

Chehreh Barq Persian: چهره برق
- Village
- Location within Iran
- Coordinates: 37°58′36″N 48°02′32″E
- Country: Iran
- Province: Ardabil
- County: Nir
- District: Central
- Rural District: Yurtchi-ye Gharbi

Population (2016)
  - Total: 68
- Time zone: UTC+3:30 (IRST)

Chehreh Barq (Persian: چهره برق) (Note: Also known as Chehreh Saraq, Churabara, and Chūrabūr) is a village in Yurtchi-ye Gharbi Rural District of the Central District in Nir County, Ardabil province, Iran.

== Demographics ==
=== Population ===
At the time of the 2006 National Census, the village's population was 75 in 17 households, when it was in Kuraim District. The following census in 2011 counted 96 people in 26 households. The 2016 census measured the population of the village as 68 people in 21 households.

The rural district was transferred to the Central District in 2019.
