= Saqqezchi, Nir =

Village in Ardabil province, Iran

Saqqezchi Persian: سقزچي
- Village
- Location within Iran
- Coordinates: 38°00′31″N 48°01′42″E
- Country: Iran
- Province: Ardabil
- County: Nir
- District: Central
- Rural District: Yurtchi-ye Gharbi

Population (2016)
  - Total: 244
- Time zone: UTC+3:30 (IRST)

Saqqezchi (Persian: سقزچي) (Note: Also romanized as Saqqezchī; also known as Sakezchī and Sakschi) is a village in Yurtchi-ye Gharbi Rural District of the Central District in Nir County, Ardabil province, Iran.

== Demographics ==
=== Population ===
At the time of the 2006 National Census, the village's population was 278 in 66 households, when it was in Kuraim District. The following census in 2011 counted 275 people in 82 households. The 2016 census measured the population of the village as 244 people in 77 households.

The rural district was transferred to the Central District in 2019.
