= Vali Asr, Ardabil =

Village in Ardabil province, Iran

Vali Asr Persian: ولي عصر
- Village
- Location within Iran
- Coordinates: 38°00′03″N 47°55′29″E
- Country: Iran
- Province: Ardabil
- County: Nir
- District: Central
- Rural District: Yurtchi-ye Gharbi

Population (2016)
  - Total: 286
- Time zone: UTC+3:30 (IRST)

Vali Asr (Persian: ولي عصر) (Note: Also romanized as Valī ‘Aşr; also known as Ilanjegh, Īlānjūq, and Yelānjūq) is a village in Yurtchi-ye Gharbi Rural District of the Central District in Nir County, Ardabil province, Iran.

== Demographics ==
=== Population ===
At the time of the 2006 National Census, the village's population was 400 in 93 households, when it was in Kuraim District. The following census in 2011 counted 411 people in 127 households. The 2016 census measured the population of the village as 286 people in 97 households.

The rural district was transferred to the Central District in 2019.
