= Mejmir =

Village in Ardabil province, Iran

Mejmir Persian: مجمير
- Village
- Location within Iran
- Coordinates: 37°59′25″N 47°58′08″E
- Country: Iran
- Province: Ardabil
- County: Nir
- District: Central
- Rural District: Yurtchi-ye Gharbi

Population (2016)
  - Total: 138
- Time zone: UTC+3:30 (IRST)

Mejmir (Persian: مجمير) (Note: Also romanized as Mejmīr; also known as Bejeh Mīr, Bījeh Mīr, Bijmir, and Borjlū) is a village in Yurtchi-ye Gharbi Rural District of the Central District in Nir County, Ardabil province, Iran.

== Demographics ==
=== Population ===
At the time of the 2006 National Census, the village's population was 193 in 46 households, when it was in Kuraim District. The following census in 2011 counted 146 people in 44 households. The 2016 census measured the population of the village as 138 people in 43 households.

The rural district was transferred to the Central District in 2019.
