= Qurtulmush =

Village in Ardabil province, Iran

Qurtulmush Persian: قورتولموش
- Village
- Location within Iran
- Coordinates: 37°55′04″N 48°12′40″E
- Country: Iran
- Province: Ardabil
- County: Nir
- District: Kuraim
- Rural District: Yurtchi-ye Sharqi

Population (2016)
  - Total: 406
- Time zone: UTC+3:30 (IRST)

Qurtulmush (Persian: قورتولموش) (Note: Also romanized as Qurtulmuš, Qurtulmuş, and Qūrtūlmūsh; also known as Gurtulmush, Kurturmish, Qūd Tolmūsh, Qūrtolmesh, Qūrtūrmesh, and Qūrtūrmūsh) is a village in Yurtchi-ye Sharqi Rural District of Kuraim District in Nir County, Ardabil province, Iran.

== Demographics ==
=== Population ===
At the time of the 2006 National Census, the village's population was 702 in 123 households. The following census in 2011 counted 544 people in 137 households. The 2016 census measured the population of the village as 406 people in 99 households. It was the most populous village in its rural district.
