= Khan Qeshlaqi =

Village in Ardabil province, Iran

Khan Qeshlaqi Persian: خانقشلاقي
- Village
- Location within Iran
- Coordinates: 38°05′25″N 48°21′10″E
- Country: Iran
- Province: Ardabil
- County: Nir
- District: Kuraim
- Rural District: Mehmandust

Population (2016)
  - Total: 163
- Time zone: UTC+3:30 (IRST)

Khan Qeshlaqi (Persian: خانقشلاقي) (Note: Also romanized as Khān Qeshlāqī; also known as Qā’emābād) is a village in Mehmandust Rural District of Kuraim District in Nir County, Ardabil province, Iran.

== Demographics ==
=== Population ===
At the time of the 2006 National Census, the village's population was 258 in 55 households. The following census in 2011 counted 182 people in 59 households. The 2016 census measured the population of the village as 163 people in 57 households.
