= Kahriz, Ardabil =

Village in Ardabil province, Iran

Kahriz Persian: كهريز
- Village
- Location within Iran
- Coordinates: 38°03′27″N 48°14′47″E
- Country: Iran
- Province: Ardabil
- County: Nir
- District: Kuraim
- Rural District: Mehmandust

Population (2016)
  - Total: 140
- Time zone: UTC+3:30 (IRST)

Kahriz (Persian: كهريز) (Note: Also romanized as Kahrīz) is a village in Mehmandust Rural District of Kuraim District in Nir County, Ardabil province, Iran.

== Demographics ==
=== Population ===
At the time of the 2006 National Census, the village's population was 154 in 35 households. The following census in 2011 counted 113 people in 35 households. The 2016 census measured the population of the village as 140 people in 42 households.
