= Shiran, Ardabil =

Village in Ardabil province, Iran

Shiran Persian: شيران
- Village
- Location within Iran
- Coordinates: 38°05′51″N 48°03′53″E
- Country: Iran
- Province: Ardabil
- County: Nir
- District: Central
- Rural District: Rezaqoli-ye Qeshlaq

Population (2016)
  - Total: 147
- Time zone: UTC+3:30 (IRST)

Shiran (Persian: شيران) (Note: Also romanized as Shīrān) is a village in Rezaqoli-ye Qeshlaq Rural District of the Central District in Nir County, Ardabil province, Iran.

== Demographics ==
=== Population ===
At the time of the 2006 National Census, the village's population was 198 in 50 households. The following census in 2011 counted 174 people in 54 households. The 2016 census measured the population of the village as 147 people in 44 households.
