= Abazar, Ardabil =

Village in Ardabil province, Iran

Abazar Persian: اباذر
- Village
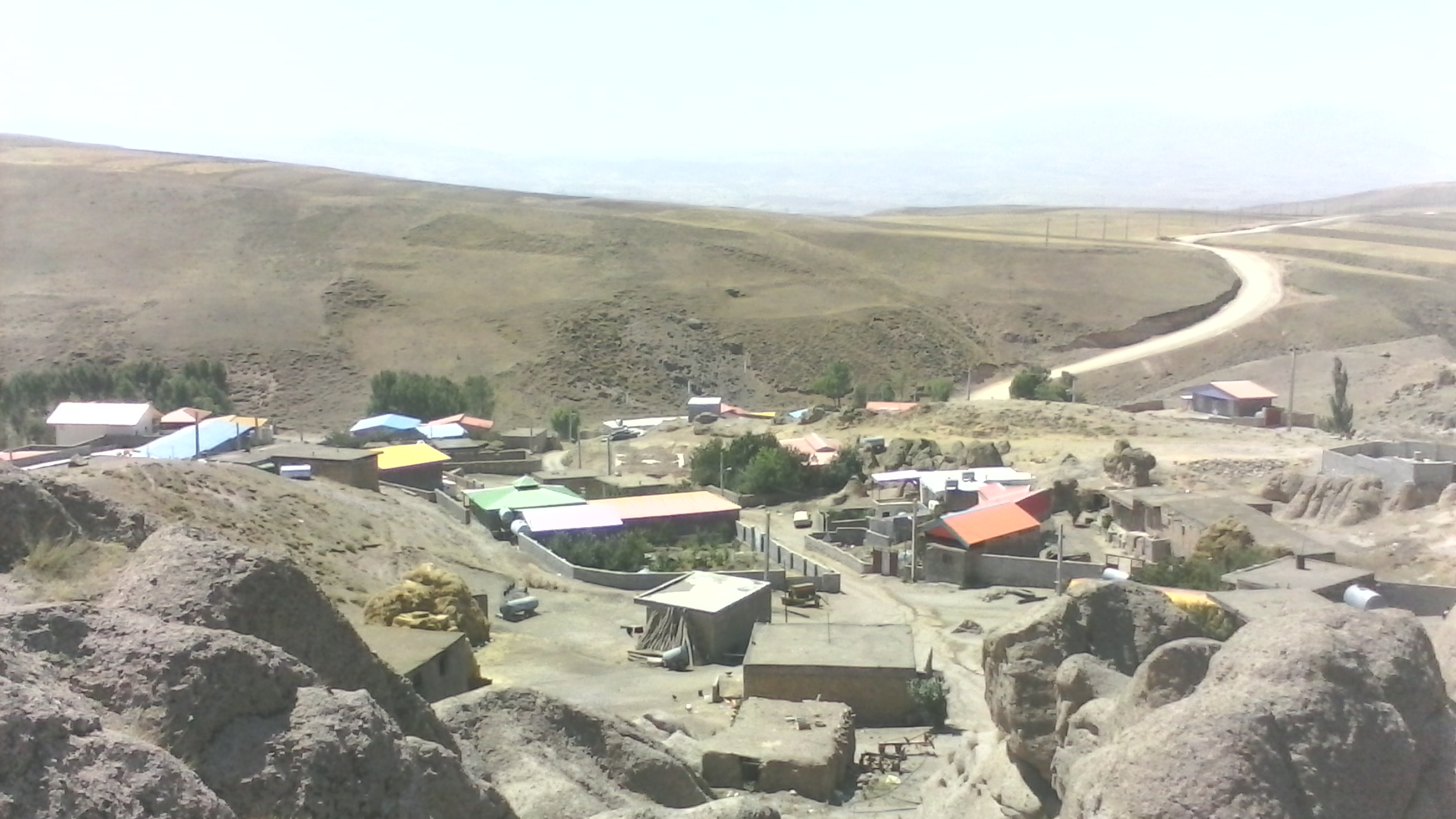
- The village of Abazar

- Location within Iran
- Coordinates: 38°00′10″N 48°04′16″E
- Country: Iran
- Province: Ardabil
- County: Nir
- District: Central
- Rural District: Yurtchi-ye Gharbi

Population (2016)
  - Total: 79
- Time zone: UTC+3:30 (IRST)

Abazar (Persian: اباذر) (Note: Also romanized as Abāz̄ar) is a village in Yurtchi-ye Gharbi Rural District of the Central District in Nir County, Ardabil province, Iran.

== Demographics ==
=== Population ===
At the time of the 2006 National Census, the village's population was 34 in 17 households, when it was in Kuraim District. The following census in 2011 counted 101 people in 39 households. The 2016 census measured the population of the village as 137 people in 51 households.

The rural district was transferred to the Central District in 2019.

== Gallery ==
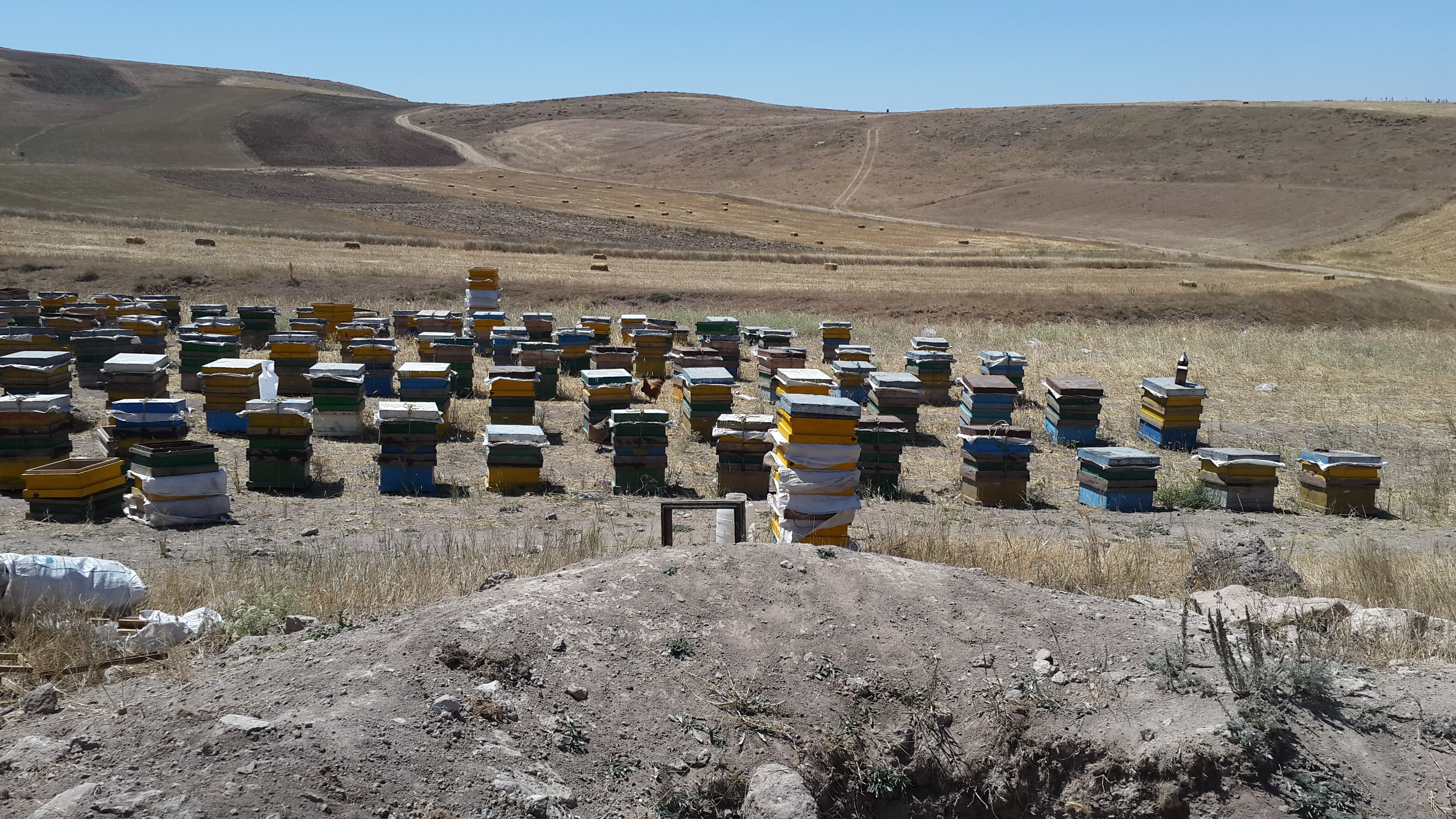
Beekeeping in the village of Abazar

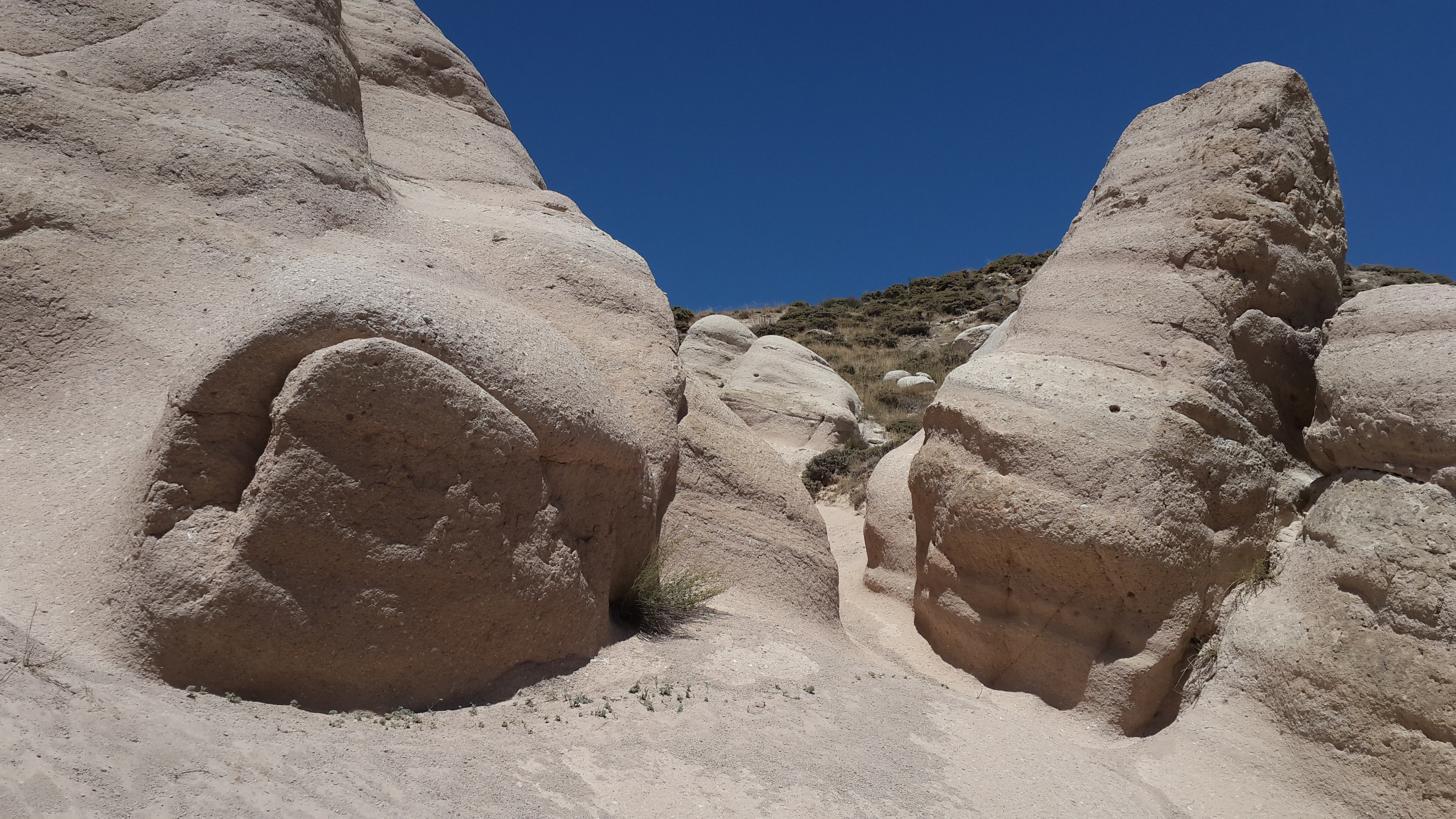
Along the Abazar River

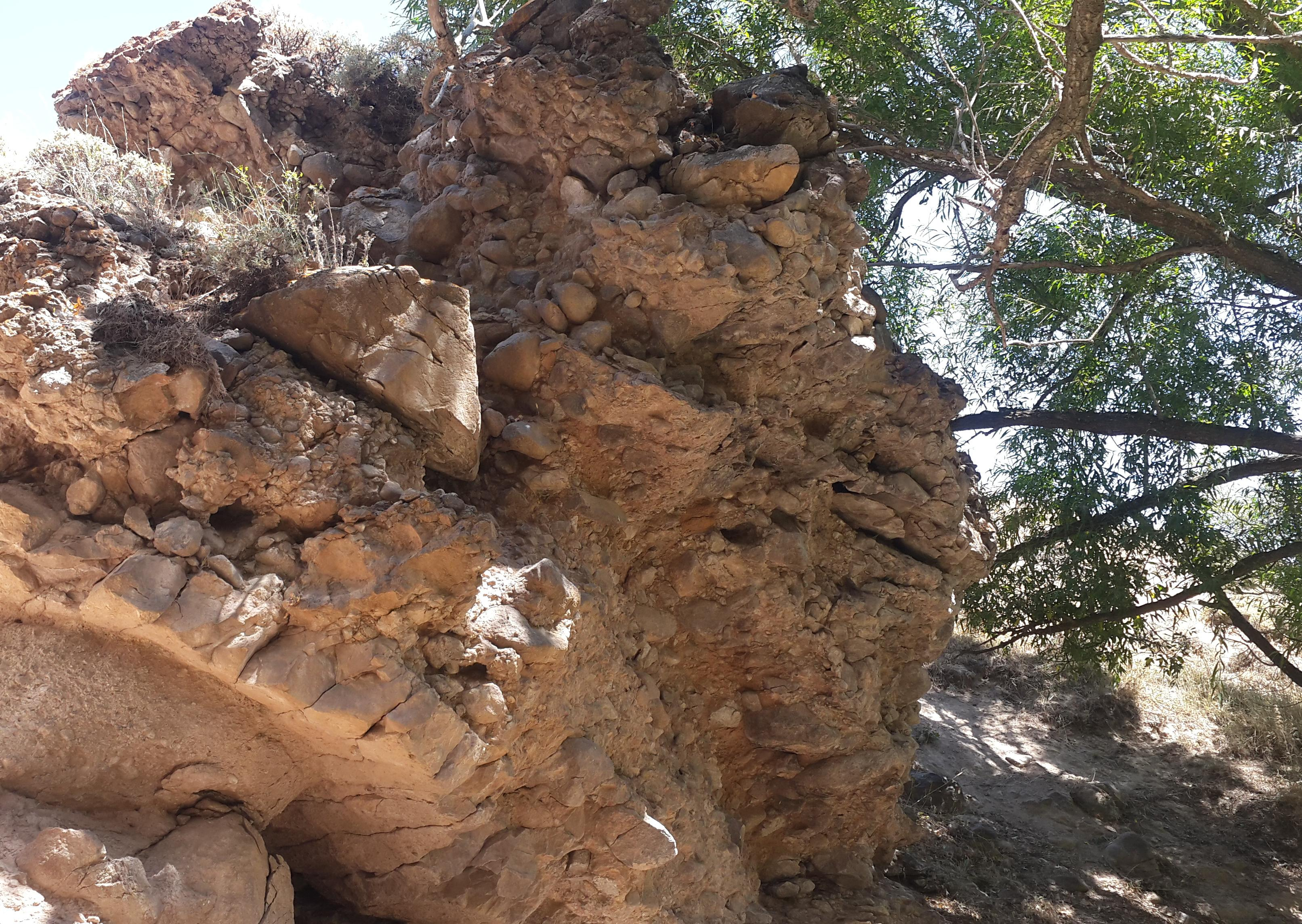
Along the Abazar River
