= Dim Seqerlu =

Village in Ardabil province, Iran

Dim Seqerlu Persian: ديم سقرلو
- Village
- Location within Iran
- Coordinates: 38°03′24″N 48°07′33″E
- Country: Iran
- Province: Ardabil
- County: Nir
- District: Central
- Rural District: Rezaqoli-ye Qeshlaq

Population (2016)
  - Total: 106
- Time zone: UTC+3:30 (IRST)

Dim Seqerlu (Persian: ديم سقرلو) (Note: Also romanized as Dīm Seqerlū; also known as Dīm Segherlū) is a village in Rezaqoli-ye Qeshlaq Rural District of the Central District in Nir County, Ardabil province, Iran.

== Demographics ==
=== Population ===
At the time of the 2006 National Census, the village's population was 126 in 29 households. The following census in 2011 counted 118 people in 35 households. The 2016 census measured the population of the village as 106 people in 30 households.
