= Kamalabad, Ardabil =

Village in Ardabil province, Iran

Kamalabad Persian: كمال اباد
- Village
- Location within Iran
- Coordinates: 38°04′47″N 47°59′38″E
- Country: Iran
- Province: Ardabil
- County: Nir
- District: Central
- Rural District: Dursun Khvajeh

Population (2016)
  - Total: 253
- Time zone: UTC+3:30 (IRST)

Kamalabad (Persian: كمال اباد) (Note: Also romanized as Kamālābād) is a village in Dursun Khvajeh Rural District of the Central District in Nir County, Ardabil province, Iran.

== Demographics ==
=== Population ===
At the time of the 2006 National Census, the village's population was 351 in 85 households. The following census in 2011 counted 298 people in 81 households. The 2016 census measured the population of the village as 253 people in 78 households.
