= Jin Qeshlaqi =

Jin Qeshlaqi (Persian: جين قشلاقي) may refer to:

- Jin Qeshlaqi, Ardabil
- Jin Qeshlaqi, East Azerbaijan
