= Buran, Ardabil =

Village in Ardabil province, Iran

Buran Persian: بوران
- Village
- Location within Iran
- Coordinates: 38°03′37″N 47°56′15″E
- Country: Iran
- Province: Ardabil
- County: Nir
- District: Central
- Rural District: Dursun Khvajeh

Population (2016)
  - Total: 120
- Time zone: UTC+3:30 (IRST)

Buran (Persian: بوران) (Note: Also romanized as Būrān) is a village in Dursun Khvajeh Rural District of the Central District in Nir County, Ardabil province, Iran.

== Demographics ==
=== Population ===
At the time of the 2006 National Census, the village's population was 103 in 17 households. The following census in 2011 counted 84 people in 22 households. The 2016 census measured the population of the village as 120 people in 45 households.
