= Khaneh Shir =

Village in Ardabil province, Iran

Khaneh Shir Persian: خانه شير
- Village
- Location within Iran
- Coordinates: 37°58′44″N 48°08′11″E
- Country: Iran
- Province: Ardabil
- County: Nir
- District: Kuraim
- Rural District: Mehmandust

Population (2016)
  - Total: 230
- Time zone: UTC+3:30 (IRST)

Khaneh Shir (Persian: خانه شير) (Note: Also romanized as Khāneh Shīr; also known as Khanashir, Kūhanashahr, Kuhnashahr, and Kūneh Shahr) is a village in Mehmandust Rural District of Kuraim District in Nir County, Ardabil province, Iran.

== Demographics ==
=== Population ===
At the time of the 2006 National Census, the village's population was 441 in 107 households. The following census in 2011 counted 296 people in 86 households. The 2016 census measured the population of the village as 230 people in 68 households.
