= Meymand, Ardabil =

Village in Ardabil province, Iran

Meymand Persian: ميمند
- Village
- Location within Iran
- Coordinates: 38°07′16″N 47°57′24″E
- Country: Iran
- Province: Ardabil
- County: Nir
- District: Central
- Rural District: Dursun Khvajeh

Population (2016)
  - Total: 176
- Time zone: UTC+3:30 (IRST)

Meymand (Persian: ميمند) is a village in Dursun Khvajeh Rural District of the Central District in Nir County, Ardabil province, Iran.

== Demographics ==
=== Population ===
At the time of the 2006 National Census, the village's population was 319 in 74 households. The following census in 2011 counted 312 people in 84 households. The 2016 census measured the population of the village as 176 people in 58 households.
