= Aliabad, Nir =

Village in Ardabil province, Iran

Aliabad Persian: علی‌آباد
- Village
- Location within Iran
- Coordinates: 38°03′15″N 48°00′40″E
- Country: Iran
- Province: Ardabil
- County: Nir
- District: Central
- Rural District: Dursun Khvajeh

Population (2016)
  - Total: 250
- Time zone: UTC+3:30 (IRST)

Aliabad (Persian: علی‌آباد) (Note: Also romanized as ‘Alīābād; also known as Valah Zāqerd, Valazāqard (‌ولزاقرد), Valeh Zāqerd, Valz̄āqerd, and Veshzagard) is a village in Dursun Khvajeh Rural District of the Central District in Nir County, Ardabil province, Iran.

== Demographics ==
=== Population ===
At the time of the 2006 National Census, the village's population was 279 in 77 households. The following census in 2011 counted 294 people in 81 households. The 2016 census measured the population of the village as 250 people in 78 households.
