= Aq Guni =

Village in Ardabil province, Iran

Aq Guni Persian: اق گوني
- Village
- Location within Iran
- Coordinates: 38°05′30″N 48°15′36″E
- Country: Iran
- Province: Ardabil
- County: Nir
- District: Kuraim
- Rural District: Mehmandust

Population (2016)
  - Total: 27
- Time zone: UTC+3:30 (IRST)

Aq Guni (Persian: اق گوني) (Note: Also romanized as Āq Gūnī; also known as Āghgūnī) is a village in Mehmandust Rural District of Kuraim District in Nir County, Ardabil province, Iran.

== Demographics ==
=== Population ===
At the time of the 2006 National Census, the village's population was 31 in six households. The following census in 2011 counted 28 people in 11 households. The 2016 census measured the population of the village as 27 people in nine households.
