= Khorayim =

Village in Ardabil province, Iran

Khorayim Persian: خراييم
- Village
- Location within Iran
- Coordinates: 37°58′15″N 48°13′36″E
- Country: Iran
- Province: Ardabil
- County: Nir
- District: Kuraim
- Rural District: Yurtchi-ye Sharqi

Population (2016)
  - Total: 37
- Time zone: UTC+3:30 (IRST)

Khorayim (Persian: خراييم) (Note: Also known as Ḩarem, Kharā’īm, Kharāyem, Kharem, Khoraim, and Khorā’īm) is a village in Yurtchi-ye Sharqi Rural District of Kuraim District in Nir County, Ardabil province, Iran.

== Demographics ==
=== Population ===
At the time of the 2006 National Census, the village's population was 60 in 15 households. The following census in 2011 counted 35 people in 11 households. The 2016 census measured the population of the village as 37 people in 10 households.
