= Golujeh, Nir =

Village in Ardabil province, Iran

Golujeh Persian: گلوجه
- Village
- Location within Iran
- Coordinates: 38°06′18″N 47°57′16″E
- Country: Iran
- Province: Ardabil
- County: Nir
- District: Central
- Rural District: Dursun Khvajeh

Population (2016)
  - Total: 67
- Time zone: UTC+3:30 (IRST)

Golujeh (Persian: گلوجه) (Note: Also romanized as Golūjeh; also known as Goljeh (گلجه), Koljeh, and Kolūjeh) is a village in Dursun Khvajeh Rural District of the Central District in Nir County, Ardabil province, Iran.

== Demographics ==
=== Population ===
At the time of the 2006 National Census, the village's population was 152 in 33 households. The following census in 2011 counted 112 people in 27 households. The 2016 census measured the population of the village as 67 people in 24 households.
