= Sorkhab, Ardabil =

Village in Ardabil province, Iran

Sorkhab Persian: سرخاب
- Village
- Location within Iran
- Coordinates: 38°05′24″N 47°54′37″E
- Country: Iran
- Province: Ardabil
- County: Nir
- District: Central
- Rural District: Dursun Khvajeh

Population (2016)
  - Total: 188
- Time zone: UTC+3:30 (IRST)

Sorkhab (Persian: سرخاب) (Note: Also romanized as Sorkhāb) is a village in Dursun Khvajeh Rural District of the Central District in Nir County, Ardabil province, Iran.

== Demographics ==
=== Population ===
At the time of the 2006 National Census, the village's population was 297 in 60 households. The following census in 2011 counted 225 people in 62 households. The 2016 census measured the population of the village as 188 people in 69 households.
