= Owzan Bolagh =

Village in Ardabil province, Iran

Owzan Bolagh Persian: اوزان بلاغ
- Village
- Location within Iran
- Coordinates: 38°00′46″N 48°09′05″E
- Country: Iran
- Province: Ardabil
- County: Nir
- District: Kuraim
- Rural District: Mehmandust

Population (2016)
  - Total: 32
- Time zone: UTC+3:30 (IRST)

Owzan Bolagh (Persian: اوزان بلاغ) (Note: Also romanized as Owzān Bolāgh; also known as Owzūn Bolāgh and Ūzūn Bolāgh) is a village in Mehmandust Rural District of Kuraim District in Nir County, Ardabil province, Iran.

== Demographics ==
=== Population ===
At the time of the 2006 National Census, the village's population was 117 in 25 households. The following census in 2011 counted 89 people in 24 households. The 2016 census measured the population of the village as 32 people in nine households.
