= Qasem Qeshlaqi, Nir =

Village in Ardabil province, Iran

Qasem Qeshlaqi Persian: قاسم قشلاقي
- Village
- Location within Iran
- Country: Iran
- Province: Ardabil
- County: Nir
- District: Kuraim
- Rural District: Yurtchi-ye Sharqi

Population (2016)
  - Total: 22
- Time zone: UTC+3:30 (IRST)

Qasem Qeshlaqi (Persian: قاسم قشلاقي) (Note: Also romanized as Qāsem Qeshlāqī; also known as Moghānlū (مغانلو)) is a village in Yurtchi-ye Sharqi Rural District of Kuraim District in Nir County, Ardabil province, Iran.

== Demographics ==
=== Population ===
At the time of the 2006 National Census, the village's population was 37 in six households. The following census in 2011 counted 58 people in 22 households. The 2016 census measured the population of the village as 22 people in eight households.
