= Pirnaq =

Village in Ardabil province, Iran

Pirnaq Persian: پيرنق
- Village
- Location within Iran
- Coordinates: 38°05′24″N 47°58′02″E
- Country: Iran
- Province: Ardabil
- County: Nir
- District: Central
- Rural District: Dursun Khvajeh

Population (2016)
  - Total: 168
- Time zone: UTC+3:30 (IRST)

Pirnaq (Persian: پيرنق) (Note: Also romanized as Pīrnaq) is a village in Dursun Khvajeh Rural District of the Central District in Nir County, Ardabil province, Iran.

== Demographics ==
=== Population ===
At the time of the 2006 National Census, the village's population was 231 in 52 households. The following census in 2011 counted 306 people in 85 households. The 2016 census measured the population of the village as 168 people in 50 households.
