= Shamsabad, Nir =

Village in Ardabil province, Iran

Shamsabad Persian: شمس اباد
- Village
- Location within Iran
- Coordinates: 38°00′10″N 48°15′01″E
- Country: Iran
- Province: Ardabil
- County: Nir
- District: Kuraim
- Rural District: Mehmandust

Population (2016)
  - Total: 135
- Time zone: UTC+3:30 (IRST)

Shamsabad (Persian: شمس اباد) (Note: Also romanized as Shamsābād) is a village in Mehmandust Rural District of Kuraim District in Nir County, Ardabil province, Iran.

== Demographics ==
=== Population ===
At the time of the 2006 National Census, the village's population was 35 in 10 households. The following census in 2011 counted 11 people in five households. The 2016 census measured the population of the village as 135 people in 49 households.
