= Shirin Bolagh, Ardabil =

Village in Ardabil province, Iran

Shirin Bolagh Persian: شيرين بلاغ
- Village
- Location within Iran
- Coordinates: 38°03′48″N 48°03′44″E
- Country: Iran
- Province: Ardabil
- County: Nir
- District: Central
- Rural District: Rezaqoli-ye Qeshlaq

Population (2016)
  - Total: 59
- Time zone: UTC+3:30 (IRST)

Shirin Bolagh (Persian: شيرين بلاغ) (Note: Also romanized as Shīrīn Bolāgh; also known as Shāh Bolāghī and Shāhbulāq) is a village in Rezaqoli-ye Qeshlaq Rural District of the Central District in Nir County, Ardabil province, Iran.

== Demographics ==
=== Population ===
At the time of the 2006 National Census, the village's population was 57 in 13 households. The following census in 2011 counted 50 people in 16 households. The 2016 census measured the population of the village as 59 people in 22 households.
