= Incheh, Nir =

Village in Ardabil province, Iran

Incheh Persian: اينچه
- Village
- Location within Iran
- Coordinates: 38°01′59″N 48°13′38″E
- Country: Iran
- Province: Ardabil
- County: Nir
- District: Kuraim
- Rural District: Mehmandust

Population (2016)
  - Total: 38
- Time zone: UTC+3:30 (IRST)

Incheh (Persian: اينچه) (Note: Also romanized as Īncheh) is a village in Mehmandust Rural District of Kuraim District in Nir County, Ardabil province, Iran.

== Demographics ==
=== Population ===
At the time of the 2006 National Census, the village's population was 82 in 23 households. The following census in 2011 counted 64 people in 27 households. The 2016 census measured the population of the village as 38 people in 16 households.
