= Golestan, Ardabil =

Village in Ardabil province, Iran

Golestan Persian: گلستان
- Village
- Location within Iran
- Coordinates: 38°05′23″N 48°02′02″E
- Country: Iran
- Province: Ardabil
- County: Nir
- District: Central
- Rural District: Rezaqoli-ye Qeshlaq

Population (2016)
  - Total: 417
- Time zone: UTC+3:30 (IRST)

Golestan (Persian: گلستان) (Note: Also romanized as Golestān; also known as Gulistan) is a village in Rezaqoli-ye Qeshlaq Rural District of the Central District in Nir County, Ardabil province, Iran.

== Demographics ==
=== Population ===
At the time of the 2006 National Census, the village's population was 390 in 96 households. The following census in 2011 counted 416 people in 120 households. The 2016 census measured the population of the village as 417 people in 126 households. It was the most populous village in its rural district.
