= Qaleh Juq, Nir =

Village in Ardabil province, Iran

Qaleh Juq Persian: قلعه جوق
- Village
- Location within Iran
- Country: Iran
- Province: Ardabil
- County: Nir
- District: Kuraim
- Rural District: Yurtchi-ye Sharqi

Population (2016)
  - Total: 116
- Time zone: UTC+3:30 (IRST)

Qaleh Juq (Persian: قلعه جوق) (Note: Also romanized as Qal‘eh Jūq; also known as Kalandzhik, Kalanjik, Qal‘eh Jaq, and Qal‘eh Jīk) is a village in Yurtchi-ye Sharqi Rural District of Kuraim District in Nir County, Ardabil province, Iran.

== Demographics ==
=== Population ===
At the time of the 2006 National Census, the village's population was 241 in 48 households. The following census in 2011 counted 204 people in 54 households. The 2016 census measured the population of the village as 116 people in 33 households.
