= Dash Bolagh, Nir =

Village in Ardabil province, Iran

Dash Bolagh Persian: داش بلاغ
- Village
- Location within Iran
- Coordinates: 37°53′56″N 48°14′56″E
- Country: Iran
- Province: Ardabil
- County: Nir
- District: Kuraim
- Rural District: Yurtchi-ye Sharqi

Population (2016)
  - Total: 92
- Time zone: UTC+3:30 (IRST)

Dash Bolagh (Persian: داش بلاغ) (Note: Also romanized as Dāsh Bolāgh and Dāshbolāgh; also known as Dash-Bulag and Dāshbulāq) is a village in Yurtchi-ye Sharqi Rural District of Kuraim District in Nir County, Ardabil province, Iran.

== Demographics ==
=== Population ===
At the time of the 2006 National Census, the village's population was 62 in 10 households. The following census in 2011 counted 97 people in 26 households. The 2016 census measured the population of the village as 92 people in 29 households.
