= Tazeh Qeshlaq, Ardabil =

Village in Ardabil province, Iran

Tazeh Qeshlaq Persian: تازه قشلاق
- Village
- Location within Iran
- Coordinates: 37°59′13″N 48°15′18″E
- Country: Iran
- Province: Ardabil
- County: Nir
- District: Kuraim
- Rural District: Yurtchi-ye Sharqi

Population (2016)
  - Total: 340
- Time zone: UTC+3:30 (IRST)

Tazeh Qeshlaq (Persian: تازه قشلاق) (Note: Also romanized as Tāzeh Qeshlāq) is a village in Yurtchi-ye Sharqi Rural District of Kuraim District in Nir County, Ardabil province, Iran.

== Demographics ==
=== Population ===
At the time of the 2006 National Census, the village's population was 79 in 14 households. The following census in 2011 counted 38 people in six households. The 2016 census measured the population of the village as 340 people in 99 households.
