= Golli, Nir =

Village in Ardabil province, Iran

Golli Persian: گلي
- Village
- Location within Iran
- Coordinates: 37°49′41″N 48°11′59″E
- Country: Iran
- Province: Ardabil
- County: Nir
- District: Kuraim
- Rural District: Yurtchi-ye Sharqi

Population (2016)
  - Total: 127
- Time zone: UTC+3:30 (IRST)

Golli (Persian: گلي) (Note: Also romanized as Gollī; also known as Gol and Gollū) is a village in Yurtchi-ye Sharqi Rural District of Kuraim District in Nir County, Ardabil province, Iran.

== Demographics ==
=== Population ===
At the time of the 2006 National Census, the village's population was 124 in 22 households. The following census in 2011 counted 134 people in 27 households. The 2016 census measured the population of the village as 127 people in 30 households.
