= Gugeh =

Village in Ardabil province, Iran

Gugeh Persian: گوگه
- Village
- Location within Iran
- Coordinates: 38°04′28″N 47°56′12″E
- Country: Iran
- Province: Ardabil
- County: Nir
- District: Central
- Rural District: Dursun Khvajeh

Population (2016)
  - Total: 141
- Time zone: UTC+3:30 (IRST)

Gugeh (Persian: گوگه) (Note: Also romanized as Gūgeh; also known as Gūger) is a village in Dursun Khvajeh Rural District of the Central District in Nir County, Ardabil province, Iran.

== Demographics ==
=== Population ===
At the time of the 2006 National Census, the village's population was 218 in 55 households. The following census in 2011 counted 186 people in 48 households. The 2016 census measured the population of the village as 141 people in 48 households.
