= Kolosh-e Bozorg =

Village in Ardabil province, Iran

Kolosh-e Bozorg Persian: كلش بزرگ
- Village
- Location within Iran
- Coordinates: 38°00′01″N 48°10′11″E
- Country: Iran
- Province: Ardabil
- County: Nir
- District: Kuraim
- Rural District: Mehmandust

Population (2016)
  - Total: 118
- Time zone: UTC+3:30 (IRST)

Kolosh-e Bozorg (Persian: كلش بزرگ) (Note: Also known as Kalāsh and Kalash-e Bozorg) is a village in Mehmandust Rural District of Kuraim District in Nir County, Ardabil province, Iran.

== Demographics ==
=== Population ===
At the time of the 2006 National Census, the village's population was 34 in 12 households. The following census in 2011 counted 26 people in nine households. The 2016 census measured the population of the village as 118 people in 36 households.
