= Jeqjeq =

Jeqjeq or Jeq Jeq (Persian: جق جق), also rendered as Dzhigdzhig or Jighjigh or Jigjig, may refer to:

- Jeqjeq-e Olya
- Jeqjeq-e Vosta
