= Aghcheh Kohol =

Village in Ardabil province, Iran

Aghcheh Kohol Persian: اغچه كهل
- Village
- Location within Iran
- Coordinates: 37°53′30″N 48°18′24″E
- Country: Iran
- Province: Ardabil
- County: Nir
- District: Kuraim
- Rural District: Yurtchi-ye Sharqi

Population (2016)
  - Total: 21
- Time zone: UTC+3:30 (IRST)

Aghcheh Kohol (Persian: اغچه كهل) (Note: Also romanized as Āghcheh Kahal and Āghcheh Kohol) is a village in Yurtchi-ye Sharqi Rural District of Kuraim District in Nir County, Ardabil province, Iran.

== Demographics ==
=== Population ===
At the time of the 2006 National Census, the village's population was 57 in seven households. The following census in 2011 counted 32 people in eight households. The 2016 census measured the population of the village as 21 people in five households.
