= Aminabad, Ardabil =

Village in Ardabil province, Iran

Aminabad Persian: امين اباد
- Village
- Location within Iran
- Coordinates: 38°00′38″N 48°11′31″E
- Country: Iran
- Province: Ardabil
- County: Nir
- District: Kuraim
- Rural District: Mehmandust

Population (2016)
  - Total: 104
- Time zone: UTC+3:30 (IRST)

Aminabad (Persian: امين اباد) (Note: Also romanized as Amīnābād) is a village in Mehmandust Rural District of Kuraim District in Nir County, Ardabil province, Iran.

== Demographics ==
=== Population ===
At the time of the 2006 National Census, the village's population was 132 in 33 households. The following census in 2011 counted 148 people in 53 households. The 2016 census measured the population of the village as 104 people in 42 households.
