= Sain, Ardabil =

Village in Ardabil province, Iran

Sain Persian: سايين
- Village
- Location within Iran
- Coordinates: 37°58′02″N 48°11′46″E
- Country: Iran
- Province: Ardabil
- County: Nir
- District: Kuraim
- Rural District: Yurtchi-ye Sharqi

Population (2016)
  - Total: 193
- Time zone: UTC+3:30 (IRST)

Sain (Persian: سايين) (Note: Also romanized as Sā’īn and Soin) is a village in Yurtchi-ye Sharqi Rural District of Kuraim District in Nir County, Ardabil province, Iran.

== Demographics ==
=== Population ===
At the time of the 2006 National Census, the village's population was 287 in 50 households. The following census in 2011 counted 251 people in 66 households. The 2016 census measured the population of the village as 193 people in 53 households.
