= Diman, Iran =

Village in Ardabil province, Iran

Diman Persian: ديمان
- Village
- Location within Iran
- Coordinates: 38°03′57″N 48°01′12″E
- Country: Iran
- Province: Ardabil
- County: Nir
- District: Central
- Rural District: Dursun Khvajeh

Population (2016)
  - Total: 353
- Time zone: UTC+3:30 (IRST)

Diman (Persian: ديمان) (Note: Also romanized as Dīmān; also known as Damānī) is a village in Dursun Khvajeh Rural District of the Central District in Nir County, Ardabil province, Iran.

== Demographics ==
=== Population ===
At the time of the 2006 National Census, the village's population was 390 in 104 households. The following census in 2011 counted 396 people in 104 households. The 2016 census measured the population of the village as 353 people in 96 households.
