= Hava Daraq =

Village in Ardabil province, Iran

Hava Daraq Persian: هوادرق
- Village
- Location within Iran
- Coordinates: 38°02′57″N 48°16′09″E
- Country: Iran
- Province: Ardabil
- County: Nir
- District: Kuraim
- Rural District: Mehmandust

Population (2016)
  - Total: 31
- Time zone: UTC+3:30 (IRST)

Hava Daraq (Persian: هوادرق) (Note: Also romanized as Havā Daraq; also known as Hāvārdaraq) is a village in Mehmandust Rural District of Kuraim District in Nir County, Ardabil province, Iran.

== Demographics ==
=== Population ===
At the time of the 2006 National Census, the village's population was 40 in eight households. The following census in 2011 counted 37 people in 13 households. The 2016 census measured the population of the village as 31 people in 13 households.
