= Parchin, Ardabil =

Village in Ardabil province, Iran

Parchin Persian: پارچين
- Village
- Location within Iran
- Coordinates: 37°57′01″N 48°11′57″E
- Country: Iran
- Province: Ardabil
- County: Nir
- District: Kuraim
- Rural District: Yurtchi-ye Sharqi

Population (2016)
  - Total: 89
- Time zone: UTC+3:30 (IRST)

Parchin (Persian: پارچين) (Note: Also romanized as Pārchīn; also known as Pāreh Chīn) is a village in Yurtchi-ye Sharqi Rural District of Kuraim District in Nir County, Ardabil province, Iran.

== Demographics ==
=== Population ===
At the time of the 2006 National Census, the village's population was 95 in 17 households. The following census in 2011 counted 86 people in 20 households. The 2016 census measured the population of the village as 89 people in 20 households.
