= Siah Push, Ardabil =

Village in Ardabil province, Iran

Siah Push Persian: سياه پوش
- Village
- Location within Iran
- Coordinates: 37°52′42″N 48°13′16″E
- Country: Iran
- Province: Ardabil
- County: Nir
- District: Kuraim
- Rural District: Yurtchi-ye Sharqi

Population (2016)
  - Total: 84
- Time zone: UTC+3:30 (IRST)

Siah Push (Persian: سياه پوش) (Note: Also romanized as Sīāh Pūsh and Sīāhpūsh; also known as Push) is a village in Yurtchi-ye Sharqi Rural District of Kuraim District in Nir County, Ardabil province, Iran.

== Demographics ==
=== Population ===
At the time of the 2006 National Census, the village's population was 96 in 20 households. The following census in 2011 counted 80 people in 18 households. The 2016 census measured the population of the village as 84 people in 24 households.
