= Qarah Tappeh, Nir =

Village in Ardabil province, Iran

Qarah Tappeh Persian: قره‌تپه
- Village
- Location within Iran
- Coordinates: 38°02′34″N 47°57′28″E
- Country: Iran
- Province: Ardabil
- County: Nir
- District: Central
- Rural District: Dursun Khvajeh

Population (2016)
  - Total: 146
- Time zone: UTC+3:30 (IRST)

Qarah Tappeh (Persian: قره‌تپه) (Note: Also romanized as Qareh Tappeh) is a village in Dursun Khvajeh Rural District of the Central District in Nir County, Ardabil province, Iran.

== Demographics ==
=== Population ===
At the time of the 2006 National Census, the village's population was 88 in 26 households. The following census in 2011 counted 145 people in 58 households. The 2016 census measured the population of the village as 146 people in 60 households.
