= Tajaraq, Ardabil =

Village in Ardabil province, Iran

Tajaraq Persian: تجرق
- Village
- Location within Iran
- Coordinates: 38°04′57″N 48°02′58″E
- Country: Iran
- Province: Ardabil
- County: Nir
- District: Central
- Rural District: Rezaqoli-ye Qeshlaq

Population (2016)
  - Total: 230
- Time zone: UTC+3:30 (IRST)

Tajaraq (Persian: تجرق) is a village in Rezaqoli-ye Qeshlaq Rural District of the Central District in Nir County, Ardabil province, Iran.

== Demographics ==
=== Population ===
At the time of the 2006 National Census, the village's population was 272 in 55 households. The following census in 2011 counted 211 people in 55 households. The 2016 census measured the population of the village as 230 people in 76 households.
