= Taj Boyuk =

Village in Ardabil province, Iran

Taj Boyuk Persian: تاج بيوك
- Village
- Location within Iran
- Coordinates: 37°57′24″N 48°18′46″E
- Country: Iran
- Province: Ardabil
- County: Nir
- District: Kuraim
- Rural District: Mehmandust

Population (2016)
  - Total: 36
- Time zone: UTC+3:30 (IRST)

Taj Boyuk (Persian: تاج بيوك) (Note: Also romanized as Tāj Boyūk; also known as Tājī Boūk, Tājī Boyūk, and Tājībeyūk) is a village in Mehmandust Rural District of Kuraim District in Nir County, Ardabil province, Iran.

== Demographics ==
=== Population ===
At the time of the 2006 National Census, the village's population was 66 in 12 households. The following census in 2011 counted 37 people in 10 households. The 2016 census measured the population of the village as 36 people in 12 households.
