= Khademlu =

Village in Ardabil province, Iran

Khademlu Persian: خادم لو
- Village
- Location within Iran
- Coordinates: 37°52′45″N 48°10′16″E
- Country: Iran
- Province: Ardabil
- County: Nir
- District: Kuraim
- Rural District: Yurtchi-ye Sharqi

Population (2016)
  - Total: 57
- Time zone: UTC+3:30 (IRST)

Khademlu (Persian: خادم لو) (Note: Also romanized as Khādemlū) is a village in Yurtchi-ye Sharqi Rural District of Kuraim District in Nir County, Ardabil province, Iran.

== Demographics ==
=== Population ===
At the time of the 2006 National Census, the village's population was 143 in 22 households. The following census in 2011 counted 96 people in 18 households. The 2016 census measured the population of the village as 57 people in 14 households.
