= Sowghanlu, Ardabil =

Village in Ardabil province, Iran

Sowghanlu Persian: سوغانلو
- Village
- Location within Iran
- Coordinates: 37°55′29″N 47°59′23″E
- Country: Iran
- Province: Ardabil
- County: Nir
- District: Central
- Rural District: Yurtchi-ye Gharbi

Population (2016)
  - Total: 127
- Time zone: UTC+3:30 (IRST)

Sowghanlu (Persian: سوغانلو) (Note: Also romanized as Sowghānlū and Sūghānlū; also known as Sakhanli and Sowqānlū) is a village in Yurtchi-ye Gharbi Rural District of the Central District in Nir County, Ardabil province, Iran.

== Demographics ==
=== Population ===
At the time of the 2006 National Census, the village's population was 183 in 42 households, when it was in Kuraim District. The following census in 2011 counted 160 people in 36 households. The 2016 census measured the population of the village as 127 people in 42 households.

The rural district was transferred to the Central District in 2019.
