= Kandovan, Ardabil =

Village in Ardabil province, Iran

Kandovan Persian: كندوان
- Village
- Location within Iran
- Coordinates: 38°07′31″N 47°54′50″E
- Country: Iran
- Province: Ardabil
- County: Nir
- District: Central
- Rural District: Dursun Khvajeh

Population (2016)
  - Total: 296
- Time zone: UTC+3:30 (IRST)

Kandovan (Persian: كندوان) (Note: Also romanized as Kandovān) is a village in Dursun Khvajeh Rural District of the Central District in Nir County, Ardabil province, Iran.

== Demographics ==
=== Population ===
At the time of the 2006 National Census, the village's population was 318 in 68 households. The following census in 2011 counted 305 people in 80 households. The 2016 census measured the population of the village as 296 people in 94 households.
