= Hajji Mahmud =

Village in Ardabil province, Iran

Hajji Mahmud Persian: حاجي محمود
- Village
- Location within Iran
- Coordinates: 37°58′51″N 48°13′47″E
- Country: Iran
- Province: Ardabil
- County: Nir
- District: Kuraim
- Rural District: Yurtchi-ye Sharqi

Population (2016)
  - Total: 142
- Time zone: UTC+3:30 (IRST)

Hajji Mahmud (Persian: حاجي محمود) (Note: Also romanized as Ḩājjī Maḩmūd) is a village in Yurtchi-ye Sharqi Rural District of Kuraim District in Nir County, Ardabil province, Iran.

== Demographics ==
=== Population ===
At the time of the 2006 National Census, the village's population was 187 in 38 households. The following census in 2011 counted 211 people in 59 households. The 2016 census measured the population of the village as 142 people in 39 households.
