= Yamchi (disambiguation) =

Yamchi is a city in East Azerbaijan Province, Iran.

Yamchi (Persian: يامچي) may also refer to:

- Yamchi-ye Olya, Ardabil Province
- Yamchi-ye Sofla, Ardabil Province
- Yamchi, Golestan
- Yamchi, Mazandaran
- Yamchi, Zanjan
- Yamchi District, in East Azerbaijan Province
