= Gugarchin, Ardabil =

Village in Ardabil province, Iran

Gugarchin Persian: گوگرچين
- Village

- Location within Iran
- Coordinates: 38°06′28″N 47°54′16″E
- Country: Iran
- Province: Ardabil
- County: Nir
- District: Central
- Rural District: Dursun Khvajeh

Population (2016)
  - Total: 139
- Time zone: UTC+3:30 (IRST)

Gugarchin (Persian: گوگرچين) (Note: Also romanized as Gūgarchīn; also known as Gūgerjīn and Moḩammed Qazveynī Gūgarchīn) is a village in Dursun Khvajeh Rural District of the Central District in Nir County, Ardabil province, Iran.

== Demographics ==
=== Population ===
At the time of the 2006 National Census, the village's population was 178 in 41 households. The following census in 2011 counted 164 people in 42 households. The 2016 census measured the population of the village as 139 people in 47 households.
