= Molla Ahmad, Ardabil =

Village in Ardabil province, Iran

Molla Ahmad Persian: ملااحمد
- Village
- Location within Iran
- Coordinates: 38°06′04″N 48°18′11″E
- Country: Iran
- Province: Ardabil
- County: Nir
- District: Kuraim
- Rural District: Mehmandust

Population (2016)
  - Total: 51
- Time zone: UTC+3:30 (IRST)

Molla Ahmad (Persian: ملااحمد) (Note: Also romanized as Mollā Aḩmad) is a village in Mehmandust Rural District of Kuraim District in Nir County, Ardabil province, Iran.

== Demographics ==
=== Population ===
At the time of the 2006 National Census, the village's population was 97 in 17 households. The following census in 2011 counted 237 people in 16 households. The 2016 census measured the population of the village as 51 people in 14 households.
