= Tutunsez =

Village in Ardabil province, Iran

Tutunsez Persian: توتونسز
- Village
- Location within Iran
- Coordinates: 37°53′04″N 48°07′38″E
- Country: Iran
- Province: Ardabil
- County: Nir
- District: Kuraim
- Rural District: Yurtchi-ye Sharqi

Population (2016)
  - Total: 199
- Time zone: UTC+3:30 (IRST)

Tutunsez (Persian: توتونسز) (Note: Also romanized as Tūtūnsez; also known as Tutunsas, Tūtūnsīn, Tūtūnsīz, Tutunsus, and Tyutyunsis) is a village in Yurtchi-ye Sharqi Rural District of Kuraim District in Nir County, Ardabil province, Iran.

== Demographics ==
=== Population ===
At the time of the 2006 National Census, the village's population was 323 in 62 households. The following census in 2011 counted 230 people in 54 households. The 2016 census measured the population of the village as 199 people in 54 households.
