= Ajghaz =

Village in Ardabil province, Iran

Ajghaz Persian: اجغاز
- Village
- Location within Iran
- Coordinates: 38°01′04″N 48°07′05″E
- Country: Iran
- Province: Ardabil
- County: Nir
- District: Central
- Rural District: Rezaqoli-ye Qeshlaq

Population (2016)
  - Total: 150
- Time zone: UTC+3:30 (IRST)

Ajghaz (Persian: اجغاز) (Note: Also romanized as Ājghāz) is a village in Rezaqoli-ye Qeshlaq Rural District of the Central District in Nir County, Ardabil province, Iran.

== Demographics ==
=== Population ===
At the time of the 2006 National Census, the village's population was 251 in 47 households. The following census in 2011 counted 224 people in 62 households. The 2016 census measured the population of the village as 150 people in 40 households.
