= Mowlan =

Mowlan (Persian: مولان) may refer to:

- Mowlan-e Olya, Ardabil Province
- Mowlan-e Sofla, Ardabil Province
- Mowlan, East Azerbaijan
