= Khvajehim =

Village in Ardabil province, Iran

Khvajehim Persian: خواجه ييم
- Village
- Location within Iran
- Coordinates: 37°55′52″N 48°19′47″E
- Country: Iran
- Province: Ardabil
- County: Nir
- District: Kuraim
- Rural District: Mehmandust

Population (2016)
  - Total: 81
- Time zone: UTC+3:30 (IRST)

Khvajehim (Persian: خواجه ييم) (Note: Also romanized as Khvājehīm; also known as Adzhim-Kishlaki, ‘Ajīm Qeshlāgh, ‘Ajīm Qeshlāq, Ajim Qishlāqi, and Khajīm) is a village in Mehmandust Rural District of Kuraim District in Nir County, Ardabil province, Iran.

== Demographics ==
=== Population ===
At the time of the 2006 National Census, the village's population was 39 in 10 households. The following census in 2011 counted 31 people in nine households. The 2016 census measured the population of the village as 81 people in 24 households.
