= Virseq =

Village in Ardabil province, Iran

Virseq Persian: ويرسق
- Village
- Location within Iran
- Coordinates: 38°03′08″N 47°57′38″E
- Country: Iran
- Province: Ardabil
- County: Nir
- District: Central
- Rural District: Dursun Khvajeh

Population (2016)
  - Total: 827
- Time zone: UTC+3:30 (IRST)

Virseq (Persian: ويرسق) (Note: Also romanized as Vīrseq and Viyarsaq; also known as Vīrtheq and Viyasa) is a village in Dursun Khvajeh Rural District of the Central District in Nir County, Ardabil province, Iran.

== Demographics ==
=== Population ===
At the time of the 2006 National Census, the village's population was 991 in 209 households. The following census in 2011 counted 993 people in 258 households. The 2016 census measured the population of the village as 827 people in 265 households. It was the most populous village in its rural district.
