= Eslamabad, Ardabil =

Village in Ardabil province, Iran

Eslamabad Persian: اسلام اباد
- Village
- Location within Iran
- Coordinates: 38°07′53″N 47°56′36″E
- Country: Iran
- Province: Ardabil
- County: Nir
- District: Central
- Rural District: Dursun Khvajeh

Population (2016)
  - Total: 417
- Time zone: UTC+3:30 (IRST)

Eslamabad (Persian: اسلام اباد) (Note: Also romanized as Eslāmābād) is a village in, and the capital of, Dursun Khvajeh Rural District in the Central District of Nir County, Ardabil province, Iran.

== Demographics ==
=== Population ===
At the time of the 2006 National Census, the village's population was 567 in 110 households. The following census in 2011 counted 554 people in 153 households. The 2016 census measured the population of the village as 417 people in 129 households.
