= Aminlu, Ardabil =

Village in Ardabil province, Iran

Aminlu Persian: امين لو
- Village
- Location within Iran
- Coordinates: 38°05′19″N 48°14′01″E
- Country: Iran
- Province: Ardabil
- County: Nir
- District: Kuraim
- Rural District: Mehmandust

Population (2016)
  - Total: 115
- Time zone: UTC+3:30 (IRST)

Aminlu (Persian: امين لو) (Note: Also romanized as Amīnlū) is a village in Mehmandust Rural District of Kuraim District in Nir County, Ardabil province, Iran.

== Demographics ==
=== Population ===
At the time of the 2006 National Census, the village's population was 150 in 32 households. The following census in 2011 counted 162 people in 41 households. The 2016 census measured the population of the village as 115 people in 33 households.
