= Sowghanlu =

Sowghanlu or Sughanlu or Sooghanloo (Persian: سوغانلو) may refer to:

- Sowghanlu, Ardabil
- Sowghanlu, West Azerbaijan
