= Busjin =

Village in Ardabil province, Iran

Busjin Persian: بوسجين
- Village
- Location within Iran
- Coordinates: 38°00′23″N 48°16′57″E
- Country: Iran
- Province: Ardabil
- County: Nir
- District: Kuraim
- Rural District: Mehmandust

Population (2016)
  - Total: 524
- Time zone: UTC+3:30 (IRST)

Busjin (Persian: بوسجين) (Note: Also romanized as Būsjīn; also known as Pūsjīn) is a village in Mehmandust Rural District of Kuraim District in Nir County, Ardabil province, Iran.

== Demographics ==
=== Population ===
At the time of the 2006 National Census, the village's population was 629 in 139 households. The following census in 2011 counted 653 people in 202 households. The 2016 census measured the population of the village as 524 people in 143 households. It was the most populous village in its rural district.
