= Inallu =

Village in Ardabil province, Iran

Inallu Persian: ايناللو
- Village
- Location within Iran
- Coordinates: 38°05′19″N 48°09′17″E
- Country: Iran
- Province: Ardabil
- County: Nir
- District: Central
- Rural District: Rezaqoli-ye Qeshlaq

Population (2016)
  - Total: 129
- Time zone: UTC+3:30 (IRST)

Inallu (Persian: ايناللو) (Note: Also romanized as Īnāllū; also known as Dānīānlī and Īnānlū) is a village in Rezaqoli-ye Qeshlaq Rural District of the Central District in Nir County, Ardabil province, Iran.

== Demographics ==
=== Population ===
At the time of the 2006 National Census, the village's population was 208 in 47 households. The following census in 2011 counted 168 people in 46 households. The 2016 census measured the population of the village as 129 people in 39 households.
