= Lay, Iran =

Village in Ardabil province, Iran

Lay Persian: لاي
- Village
- Location within Iran
- Coordinates: 38°06′57″N 47°54′18″E
- Country: Iran
- Province: Ardabil
- County: Nir
- District: Central
- Rural District: Dursun Khvajeh

Population (2016)
  - Total: 149
- Time zone: UTC+3:30 (IRST)

Lay (Persian: لاي) (Note: Also romanized as Lāy) is a village in Dursun Khvajeh Rural District of the Central District in Nir County, Ardabil province, Iran.

== Demographics ==
=== Population ===
At the time of the 2006 National Census, the village's population was 178 in 42 households. The following census in 2011 counted 147 people in 40 households. The 2016 census measured the population of the village as 149 people in 56 households.
