= Rezaqoli-ye Qeshlaqi =

Village in Ardabil province, Iran

Rezaqoli-ye Qeshlaqi Persian: رضاقلي قشلاقي
- Village
- Location within Iran
- Coordinates: 38°06′24″N 48°08′31″E
- Country: Iran
- Province: Ardabil
- County: Nir
- District: Central
- Rural District: Rezaqoli-ye Qeshlaq

Population (2016)
  - Total: 211
- Time zone: UTC+3:30 (IRST)

Rezaqoli-ye Qeshlaqi (Persian: رضاقلي قشلاقي) (Note: Also romanized as Reẕāqolī-ye Qeshlāqī; also known as Reẕāqolī Qeshlāq) is a village in, and the capital of, Rezaqoli-ye Qeshlaq Rural District in the Central District of Nir County, Ardabil province, Iran.

== Demographics ==
=== Population ===
At the time of the 2006 National Census, the village's population was 232 in 53 households. The following census in 2011 counted 262 people in 70 households. The 2016 census measured the population of the village as 211 people in 58 households.
