= Aq Daraq, Nir =

Village in Ardabil province, Iran

Aq Daraq Persian: اق درق
- Village
- Location within Iran
- Coordinates: 38°06′38″N 48°17′04″E
- Country: Iran
- Province: Ardabil
- County: Nir
- District: Kuraim
- Rural District: Mehmandust

Population (2016)
  - Total: 21
- Time zone: UTC+3:30 (IRST)

Aq Daraq (Persian: اق درق) (Note: Also romanized as Āq Daraq) is a village in Mehmandust Rural District of Kuraim District in Nir County, Ardabil province, Iran.

== Demographics ==
=== Population ===
At the time of the 2006 National Census, the village's population was 48 in eight households. The following census in 2011 counted 33 people in nine households. The 2016 census measured the population of the village as 21 people in six households.
