= Pileh Sehran =

Village in Ardabil province, Iran

Pileh Sehran Persian: پيله سهران
- Village
- Location within Iran
- Coordinates: 37°50′42″N 48°09′25″E
- Country: Iran
- Province: Ardabil
- County: Nir
- District: Kuraim
- Rural District: Yurtchi-ye Sharqi

Population (2016)
  - Total: 29
- Time zone: UTC+3:30 (IRST)

Pileh Sehran (Persian: پيله سهران) (Note: Also romanized as Pīleh Sahrān and Pīreh Sehrān) is a village in Yurtchi-ye Sharqi Rural District of Kuraim District in Nir County, Ardabil province, Iran.

== Demographics ==
=== Population ===
At the time of the 2006 National Census, the village's population was 46 in five households. The following census in 2011 counted 47 people in 12 households. The 2016 census measured the population of the village as 29 people in seven households.
