= Chay Seqerlu =

Village in Ardabil province, Iran

Chay Seqerlu Persian: چاي سقرلو
- Village
- Location within Iran
- Coordinates: 38°06′02″N 48°06′54″E
- Country: Iran
- Province: Ardabil
- County: Nir
- District: Central
- Rural District: Rezaqoli-ye Qeshlaq

Population (2016)
  - Total: 120
- Time zone: UTC+3:30 (IRST)

Chay Seqerlu (Persian: چاي سقرلو) (Note: Also romanized as Chāy Seqerlū; also known as Chāy Segherlū) is a village in Rezaqoli-ye Qeshlaq Rural District of the Central District in Nir County, Ardabil province, Iran.

== Demographics ==
=== Population ===
At the time of the 2006 National Census, the village's population was 150 in 39 households. The following census in 2011 counted 149 people in 45 households. The 2016 census measured the population of the village as 120 people in 38 households.
