= Irenji =

Village in Ardabil province, Iran

Irenji Persian: ايرنجي
- Village
- Location within Iran
- Coordinates: 38°04′28″N 47°54′55″E
- Country: Iran
- Province: Ardabil
- County: Nir
- District: Central
- Rural District: Dursun Khvajeh

Population (2016)
  - Total: 288
- Time zone: UTC+3:30 (IRST)

Irenji (Persian: ايرنجي) (Note: Also romanized as Īrenjī; also known as Īrīnchī) is a village in Dursun Khvajeh Rural District of the Central District in Nir County, Ardabil province, Iran.

== Demographics ==
=== Population ===
At the time of the 2006 National Census, the village's population was 373 in 81 households. The following census in 2011 counted 319 people in 103 households. The 2016 census measured the population of the village as 288 people in 98 households.
