= Qayah Qeshlaqi, Ardabil =

Village in Ardabil province, Iran

Qayah Qeshlaqi Persian: قيه قشلاقي
- Village
- Location within Iran
- Coordinates: 38°02′11″N 48°11′41″E
- Country: Iran
- Province: Ardabil
- County: Nir
- District: Kuraim
- Rural District: Mehmandust

Population (2016)
  - Total: 67
- Time zone: UTC+3:30 (IRST)

Qayah Qeshlaqi (Persian: قيه قشلاقي) (Note: Also romanized as Qayah Qeshlāqī) is a village in Mehmandust Rural District of Kuraim District in Nir County, Ardabil province, Iran.

== Demographics ==
=== Population ===
At the time of the 2006 National Census, the village's population was 129 in 27 households. The following census in 2011 counted 217 people in 67 households. The 2016 census measured the population of the village as 67 people in 22 households.
