= Seqdel =

Village in Ardabil province, Iran

Seqdel Persian: سقدل
- Village
- Location within Iran
- Country: Iran
- Province: Ardabil
- County: Nir
- District: Kuraim
- Rural District: Yurtchi-ye Sharqi

Population (2016)
  - Total: Below reporting threshold
- Time zone: UTC+3:30 (IRST)

Seqdel (Persian: سقدل) (Note: Also romanized as Saqdal; also known as Bālā Saqdal) is a village in Yurtchi-ye Sharqi Rural District of Kuraim District in Nir County, Ardabil province, Iran.

== Demographics ==
=== Population ===
At the time of the 2006 National Census, the village's population was 41 in eight households. The following census in 2011 counted 25 people in seven households. The 2016 census measured the population of the village as below the reporting threshold.
