= Tak Bolagh =

Tak Bolagh (Persian: تك بلاغ) may refer to:

- Tak Bolagh, Germi
- Tak Bolagh, Meshgin Shahr
- Tak Bolagh, Nir
