= Tak Bolagh, Nir =

Village in Ardabil province, Iran

Tak Bolagh Persian: تك بلاغ
- Village
- Location within Iran
- Coordinates: 38°01′33″N 48°04′50″E
- Country: Iran
- Province: Ardabil
- County: Nir
- District: Central
- Rural District: Rezaqoli-ye Qeshlaq

Population (2016)
  - Total: 25
- Time zone: UTC+3:30 (IRST)

Tak Bolagh (Persian: تك بلاغ) (Note: Also romanized as Tak Bolāgh) is a village in Rezaqoli-ye Qeshlaq Rural District of the Central District in Nir County, Ardabil province, Iran.

== Demographics ==
=== Population ===
The village did not appear in the 2006 National Census. The following census in 2011 counted 84 people in 37 households. The 2016 census measured the population of the village as 25 people in seven households.
