= Mowlan-e Sofla =

Village in Ardabil province, Iran

Mowlan-e Sofla Persian: مولان سفلي
- Village
- Location within Iran
- Coordinates: 37°59′42″N 48°19′58″E
- Country: Iran
- Province: Ardabil
- County: Nir
- District: Kuraim
- Rural District: Mehmandust

Population (2016)
  - Total: 48
- Time zone: UTC+3:30 (IRST)

Mowlan-e Sofla (Persian: مولان سفلي) (Note: Also romanized as Mowlān-e Soflá; also known as Sūlān) is a village in Mehmandust Rural District of Kuraim District in Nir County, Ardabil province, Iran.

== Demographics ==
=== Population ===
At the time of the 2006 National Census, the village's population was 11 in six households. The following census in 2011 counted 56 people in 19 households. The 2016 census measured the population of the village as 48 people in 22 households.
