= Aqchay-e Olya =

Village in Ardabil province, Iran

Aqchay-e Olya Persian: اق چاي عليا
- Village
- Location within Iran
- Coordinates: 37°55′34″N 48°07′11″E
- Country: Iran
- Province: Ardabil
- County: Nir
- District: Kuraim
- Rural District: Yurtchi-ye Sharqi

Population (2016)
  - Total: 29
- Time zone: UTC+3:30 (IRST)

Aqchay-e Olya (Persian: اق چاي عليا) (Note: Also romanized as Āq Chāy-e ‘Olyā and Āqchāy ‘Olyā; also known as Āgh Chāy Bālā, Akchay-Ulia, Āq Chāy, Āq Chāy-e Bālā, Āqā Chāy-e Bālā, and Aqchāi Ulia) is a village in Yurtchi-ye Sharqi Rural District of Kuraim District in Nir County, Ardabil province, Iran.

== Demographics ==
=== Population ===
At the time of the 2006 National Census, the village's population was 43 in eight households. The following census in 2011 counted 35 people in eight households. The 2016 census measured the population of the village as 29 people in nine households.
