= Aqchay-e Sofla =

Village in Ardabil province, Iran

Aqchay-e Sofla Persian: اق چاي سفلي
- Village
- Location within Iran
- Coordinates: 37°56′17″N 48°10′00″E
- Country: Iran
- Province: Ardabil
- County: Nir
- District: Kuraim
- Rural District: Yurtchi-ye Sharqi

Population (2016)
  - Total: 59
- Time zone: UTC+3:30 (IRST)

Aqchay-e Sofla (Persian: اق چاي سفلي) (Note: Also Romanized as Āqchāy Soflá and Aqchāy-e Soflá; also known as Āgh Chāy Pā’īn, Akchayl-y, Āq Chāy-e Pā’īn, and Āqā Chāy-e Pā’īn) is a village in Yurtchi-ye Sharqi Rural District of Kuraim District in Nir County, Ardabil province, Iran.

== Demographics ==
=== Population ===
At the time of the 2006 National Census, the village's population was 207 in 38 households. The following census in 2011 counted 83 people in 18 households. The 2016 census measured the population of the village as 59 people in 17 households.
