= Abazar =

Abazar (Persian: اباذر) may refer to:

- Abazar, Ardabil
- Abazar, Khuzestan

== See also ==
- Abizar, also called Abu Zarr, a companion of Muhammad and a Shi'a of Ali
- Abuzar
