= Jin Qeshlaqi, Ardabil =

Village in Ardabil province, Iran

Jin Qeshlaqi Persian: جين قشلاقي
- Village
- Location within Iran
- Coordinates: 37°58′37″N 48°17′19″E
- Country: Iran
- Province: Ardabil
- County: Nir
- District: Kuraim
- Rural District: Mehmandust

Population (2016)
  - Total: 138
- Time zone: UTC+3:30 (IRST)

Jin Qeshlaqi (Persian: جين قشلاقي) (Note: Also romanized as Jīn Qeshlāqī; also known as Ḩasan Qeshlāq, Jenn Qeshlāqī, and Jīn Qeshlāq) is a village in Mehmandust Rural District of Kuraim District in Nir County, Ardabil province, Iran.

== Demographics ==
=== Population ===
At the time of the 2006 National Census, the village's population was 321 in 69 households. The following census in 2011 counted 242 people in 77 households. The 2016 census measured the population of the village as 138 people in 48 households.
