= Dabanlu =

Dabanlu (Persian: دابانلو) may refer to:

- Dabanlu, Ardabil
- Dabanlu, Zanjan
