= Jurab, Ardabil =

Village in Ardabil province, Iran

Jurab Persian: جوراب
- Village
- Location within Iran
- Coordinates: 38°03′32″N 48°02′49″E
- Country: Iran
- Province: Ardabil
- County: Nir
- District: Central
- Rural District: Rezaqoli-ye Qeshlaq

Population (2016)
  - Total: 305
- Time zone: UTC+3:30 (IRST)

Jurab (Persian: جوراب) (Note: Also romanized as Jūrāb) is a village in Rezaqoli-ye Qeshlaq Rural District of the Central District in Nir County, Ardabil province, Iran.

== Demographics ==
=== Population ===
At the time of the 2006 National Census, the village's population was 299 in 72 households. The following census in 2011 counted 284 people in 80 households. The 2016 census measured the population of the village as 305 people in 83 households.
