= Mowlan-e Olya =

Village in Ardabil province, Iran

Mowlan-e Olya Persian: مولان عليا
- Village
- Location within Iran
- Coordinates: 37°59′43″N 48°20′13″E
- Country: Iran
- Province: Ardabil
- County: Nir
- District: Kuraim
- Rural District: Mehmandust

Population (2016)
  - Total: 30
- Time zone: UTC+3:30 (IRST)

Mowlan-e Olya (Persian: مولان عليا) (Note: Also romanized as Mowlān-e ‘Olyā; also known as Mowlān) is a village in Mehmandust Rural District of Kuraim District in Nir County, Ardabil province, Iran.

== Demographics ==
=== Population ===
At the time of the 2006 National Census, the village's population was 51 in 12 households. The following census in 2011 counted 53 people in 14 households. The 2016 census measured the population of the village as 30 people in nine households.
