= Mehmandust-e Sofla =

Village in Ardabil province, Iran

Mehmandust-e Sofla Persian: مهماندوست سفلي
- Village
- Location within Iran
- Coordinates: 38°03′20″N 48°19′22″E
- Country: Iran
- Province: Ardabil
- County: Nir
- District: Kuraim
- Rural District: Mehmandust

Population (2016)
  - Total: 76
- Time zone: UTC+3:30 (IRST)

Mehmandust-e Sofla (Persian: مهماندوست سفلي) (Note: Also romanized as Mehmāndūst-e Soflá; also known as Mehmāndūst, Mehmāndūst-e Pā’īn, and Mīhmāndūst-e Pā’īn) is a village in Mehmandust Rural District of Kuraim District in Nir County, Ardabil province, Iran.

== Demographics ==
=== Population ===
At the time of the 2006 National Census, the village's population was 100 in 22 households. The following census in 2011 counted 79 people in 22 households. The 2016 census measured the population of the village as 76 people in 19 households.
