= Yamchi-ye Olya =

Village in Ardabil province, Iran

Yamchi-ye Olya Persian: يامچي عليا
- Village
- Location within Iran
- Coordinates: 38°02′37″N 48°02′59″E
- Country: Iran
- Province: Ardabil
- County: Nir
- District: Central
- Rural District: Rezaqoli-ye Qeshlaq

Population (2016)
  - Total: 221
- Time zone: UTC+3:30 (IRST)

Yamchi-ye Olya (Persian: يامچي عليا) (Note: Also romanized as Yāmchī-ye ‘Olyā; also known as Yamchi Yukari, Yamchī Yūkhārī, and Yāmchī-ye Bālā) is a village in Rezaqoli-ye Qeshlaq Rural District of the Central District in Nir County, Ardabil province, Iran.

== Demographics ==
=== Population ===
At the time of the 2006 National Census, the village's population was 233 in 63 households. The following census in 2011 counted 266 people in 79 households. The 2016 census measured the population of the village as 221 people in 69 households.
