= Jurab =

Jurab (Persian: جوراب) may refer to:

- Jurab, Alborz
- Jurab, Ardabil
- Jurab, Hamadan
