= Karan-e Bozorg =

Karan-e Bozorg (Persian: بزرگ كران) may refer to:

- Karan-e Bozorg, Khalkhal
- Karan-e Bozorg, Nir
