= Yamchi-ye Sofla =

Village in Ardabil province, Iran

Yamchi-ye Sofla Persian: يامچي سفلي
- Village
- Location within Iran
- Coordinates: 38°04′48″N 48°05′28″E
- Country: Iran
- Province: Ardabil
- County: Nir
- District: Central
- Rural District: Rezaqoli-ye Qeshlaq

Population (2016)
  - Total: 65
- Time zone: UTC+3:30 (IRST)

Yamchi-ye Sofla (Persian: يامچي سفلي) (Note: Also romanized as Yāmchī-ye Soflá; also known as Yāmchī and Yāmchī-ye Pā’īn) is a village in Rezaqoli-ye Qeshlaq Rural District of the Central District in Nir County, Ardabil province, Iran.

== Demographics ==
=== Population ===
At the time of the 2006 National Census, the village's population was 106 in 26 households. The following census in 2011 counted 101 people in 28 households. The 2016 census measured the population of the village as 65 people in 19 households.
