= Mehmandust-e Olya, Nir =

Village in Ardabil province, Iran

Mehmandust-e Olya مهماندوست عليا
- Village
- Location within Iran
- Coordinates: 38°02′36″N 48°18′11″E
- Country: Iran
- Province: Ardabil
- County: Nir
- District: Kuraim
- Rural District: Mehmandust

Population (2016)
  - Total: 241
- Time zone: UTC+3:30 (IRST)

Mehmandust-e Olya (Persian: مهماندوست عليا) (Note: Also romanized as Mehmāndūst-e ‘Olyā; also known as Mehmāndūst-e Bālā and Mīhmāndūst-e Bālā) is a village in, and the capital of, Mehmandust Rural District in Kuraim District of Nir County, Ardabil province, Iran.

== Demographics ==
=== Population ===
At the time of the 2006 National Census, the village's population was 375 in 75 households. The following census in 2011 counted 283 people in 81 households. The 2016 census measured the population of the village as 241 people in 67 households.
