= Dabanlu, Ardabil =

Village in Ardabil province, Iran

Dabanlu Persian: دابانلو
- Village
- Location within Iran
- Coordinates: 37°51′39″N 48°12′24″E
- Country: Iran
- Province: Ardabil
- County: Nir
- District: Kuraim
- Rural District: Yurtchi-ye Sharqi

Population (2016)
  - Total: 21
- Time zone: UTC+3:30 (IRST)

Dabanlu (Persian: دابانلو) (Note: Also romanized as Dābānlū) is a village in Yurtchi-ye Sharqi Rural District of Kuraim District in Nir County, Ardabil province, Iran.

== Demographics ==
=== Population ===
At the time of the 2006 National Census, the village's population was 29 in five households. The following census in 2011 counted 28 people in eight households. The 2016 census measured the population of the village as 21 people in six households.
