= Jeqjeq-e Vosta =

Village in Ardabil province, Iran

Jeqjeq-e Vosta Persian: جق جق وسطي
- Village
- Location within Iran
- Coordinates: 37°52′25″N 48°14′24″E
- Country: Iran
- Province: Ardabil
- County: Nir
- District: Kuraim
- Rural District: Yurtchi-ye Sharqi

Population (2016)
  - Total: 11
- Time zone: UTC+3:30 (IRST)

Jeqjeq-e Vosta (Persian: جق جق وسطي) (Note: Also romanized as Jeqjeq-e Vostá) is a village in Yurtchi-ye Sharqi Rural District of Kuraim District in Nir County, Ardabil province, Iran.

== Demographics ==
=== Population ===
At the time of the 2006 National Census, the village's population was 41 in seven households. The following census in 2011 counted 16 people in six households. The 2016 census measured the population of the village as 11 people in four households.
