= Jeqjeq-e Olya =

Village in Ardabil province, Iran

Jeqjeq-e Olya Persian: جق جق عليا
- Village
- Location within Iran
- Coordinates: 37°52′07″N 48°15′01″E
- Country: Iran
- Province: Ardabil
- County: Nir
- District: Kuraim
- Rural District: Yurtchi-ye Sharqi

Population (2016)
  - Total: Below reporting threshold
- Time zone: UTC+3:30 (IRST)

Jeqjeq-e Olya (Persian: جق جق عليا) (Note: Also romanized as Jeqjeq-e ‘Olyā; also known as Dzhigdzhig, Jeq Jeq-e Bālā, Jeqjeq, Jeqjeq-e Bālā, Jīghjīgh, and Jigjig) is a village in Yurtchi-ye Sharqi Rural District of Kuraim District in Nir County, Ardabil province, Iran.

== Demographics ==
=== Population ===
At the time of the 2006 National Census, the village's population was 25 in six households. The following census in 2011 counted 41 people in 13 households. The 2016 census measured the population of the village as below the reporting threshold.
