= Aqchay-e Vosta =

Village in Ardabil province, Iran

Aqchay-e Vosta Persian: اق چاي وسطي
- Village
- Location within Iran
- Coordinates: 37°56′28″N 48°08′32″E
- Country: Iran
- Province: Ardabil
- County: Nir
- District: Kuraim
- Rural District: Yurtchi-ye Sharqi

Population (2016)
  - Total: Below reporting threshold
- Time zone: UTC+3:30 (IRST)

Aqchay-e Vosta (Persian: اق چاي وسطي) (Note: Also romanized as Āqchāy-e Vosţá; also known as Āgh Chāy Vasaţ, Āq Chāy-e Vasaţ, Āqā Chāy-e Vasaţ, and Āqchāy Bābā ‘Alī Qeshlāqī) is a village in Yurtchi-ye Sharqi Rural District of Kuraim District in Nir County, Ardabil province, Iran.

== Demographics ==
=== Population ===
At the time of the 2006 National Census, the village's population was 10 in five households. The following census in 2011 counted seven people in four households. The 2016 census measured the population of the village as below the reporting threshold.
