= Rezaqoli-ye Qeshlaq Rural District =

Rural district in Ardabil province, Iran

Rezaqoli-ye Qeshlaq Rural District Persian: دهستان رضاقلی قشلاق
- Rural District
- Location within Iran
- Coordinates: 38°03′N 48°07′E
- Country: Iran
- Province: Ardabil
- County: Nir
- District: Central
- Established: 1990
- Capital: Rezaqoli-ye Qeshlaqi

Population (2016)
  - Total: 2,185
- Time zone: UTC+3:30 (IRST)

Rezaqoli-ye Qeshlaq Rural District (Persian: دهستان رضاقلی قشلاق) is in the Central District of Nir County, Ardabil province, Iran. Its capital is the village of Rezaqoli-ye Qeshlaqi.

== Demographics ==
=== Population ===
At the time of the 2006 National Census, the rural district's population was 2,522 in 590 households. There were 2,507 inhabitants in 727 households at the following census of 2011. The 2016 census measured the population of the rural district as 2,185 in 651 households. The most populous of its 13 villages was Golestan, with 417 people.

=== Other villages in the rural district ===
- Ajghaz
- Chay Seqerlu
- Dim Seqerlu
- Inallu
- Jurab
- Shiran
- Shirin Bolagh
- Tajaraq
- Tak Bolagh
- Yamchi-ye Olya
- Yamchi-ye Sofla
