= Dursun Khvajeh Rural District =

Rural district in Ardabil province, Iran

Dursun Khvajeh Rural District Persian: دهستان دورسون خواجه
- Rural District
- Location within Iran
- Coordinates: 38°07′N 47°56′E
- Country: Iran
- Province: Ardabil
- County: Nir
- District: Central
- Established: 1987
- Capital: Eslamabad

Population (2016)
  - Total: 4,132
- Time zone: UTC+3:30 (IRST)

Dursun Khvajeh Rural District (Persian: دهستان دورسون خواجه) is in the Central District of Nir County, Ardabil province, Iran. Its capital is the village of Eslamabad.

== Demographics ==
=== Population ===
At the time of the 2006 National Census, the rural district's population was 5,267 in 1,354 households. There were 5,021 inhabitants in 1,383 households at the following census of 2011. The 2016 census measured the population of the rural district as 4,132 in 1,354 households. The most populous of its 18 villages was Virseq, with 827 people.

=== Other villages in the rural district ===
- Aliabad
- Buran
- Diman
- Golujeh
- Gugarchin
- Gugeh
- Irenji
- Kaleh Sar
- Kamalabad
- Kandovan
- Lay
- Meymand
- Pirnaq
- Qarah Tappeh
- Sorkhab
