= Yurtchi-ye Sharqi Rural District =

Rural district in Ardabil province, Iran

Yurtchi-ye Sharqi Rural District Persian: دهستان يورتچی شرقی
- Rural District
- Location within Iran
- Coordinates: 37°54′N 48°13′E
- Country: Iran
- Province: Ardabil
- County: Nir
- District: Kuraim
- Established: 1987
- Capital: Kuraim

Population (2016)
  - Total: 2,112
- Time zone: UTC+3:30 (IRST)

Yurtchi-ye Sharqi Rural District (Persian: دهستان يورتچي شرقي) is in Kuraim District of Nir County, Ardabil province, Iran. It is administered from the city of Kuraim.

== Demographics ==
=== Population ===
At the time of the 2006 National Census, the rural district's population was 2,962 in 543 households. There were 2,473 inhabitants in 628 households at the following census of 2011. The 2016 census measured the population of the rural district as 2,112 in 570 households. The most populous of its 26 villages was Qurtulmush, with 406 people.

=== Other villages in the rural district ===
- Aghcheh Kohol
- Aqchay-e Olya
- Aqchay-e Sofla
- Aqchay-e Vosta
- Dabanlu
- Dagmeh Daghildi
- Dash Bolagh
- Dowshanlu
- Golli
- Hajji Mahmud
- Jelogir
- Jeqjeq-e Olya
- Jeqjeq-e Vosta
- Keriq-e Bozorg
- Khademlu
- Khorayim
- Parchin
- Pileh Sehran
- Qaleh Juq
- Qasem Qeshlaqi
- Qonan Qaran
- Said Khanlu
- Sain
- Seqdel
- Siah Push
- Tazeh Qeshlaq
- Tutunsez
