= Kuraim =

City in Ardabil province, Iran

Kuraim Persian: كوراييم
- City
- Location within Iran
- Coordinates: 37°57′17″N 48°14′08″E
- Country: Iran
- Province: Ardabil
- County: Nir
- District: Kuraim

Population (2016)
  - Total: 831
- Time zone: UTC+3:30 (IRST)

Kuraim (Persian: كوراييم or كورائيم (Note: Also romanized as Kowrāyem, Kūrā’īm, and Kūraīm) is a city in, and the capital of, Kuraim District in Nir County, Ardabil province, Iran. It also serves as the administrative center for Yurtchi-ye Sharqi Rural District.

== Demographics ==
=== Population ===
At the time of the 2006 National Census, the city's population was 781 in 167 households. The following census in 2011 counted 854 people in 220 households. The 2016 census measured the population of the city as 831 people in 234 households.
