= Nir, Ardabil =

City in Ardabil province, Iran

Nir Persian: نیر
- City
- Location within Iran
- Coordinates: 38°02′07″N 48°00′25″E
- Country: Iran
- Province: Ardabil
- County: Nir
- District: Central

Population (2016)
  - Total: 5,873
- Time zone: UTC+3:30 (IRST)

Nir (Persian: نیر) (Note: Also romanized as Nīr) is a city in the Central District of Nir County, Ardabil province, Iran, serving as capital of both the county and the district.

== Demographics ==
=== Population ===
At the time of the 2006 National Census, the city's population was 4,818 in 1,264 households. The following census in 2011 counted 5,820 people in 1,551 households. The 2016 census measured the population of the city as 5,873 people in 1,715 households.
