= Mohamandust-e Olya =

Mohamandust-e Olya or Mehmandust-e Olya (Persian: مهماندوست عليا) may refer to:

- Mohamandust-e Olya, Meshgin Shahr
- Mehmandust-e Olya, Nir
