= Jin Qeshlaqi, East Azerbaijan =

Coordinates: 37.9800°N 48.2867°E

Jin Qeshlaqi جين قشلاقي
- Village
- Interactive map of Jin Qeshlaqi
- Country: Iran
- Province: East Azerbaijan
- County: Meyaneh
- Bakhsh: Central
- Rural District: Garmeh-ye Jonubi

Population (2006)
  - Total: 44
- Time zone: UTC+3:30 (IRST)
  - Summer (DST): UTC+4:30 (IRDT)

Jin Qeshlaqi (Persian: جين قشلاقي, also Romanized as Jīn Qeshlāqī) is a village in Garmeh-ye Jonubi Rural District, in the Central District of Meyaneh County, East Azerbaijan Province, Iran. At the 2006 census, its population was 44, in 8 families.
