= Sowghanlu, West Azerbaijan =

Sowghanlu سوغان لو
- Village
- Location within Iran
- Coordinates: 36°37′07″N 45°12′57″E
- Country: Iran
- Province: West Azerbaijan
- County: Piranshahr
- Bakhsh: Central
- Rural District: Piran

Population (2006)
  - Total: 598
- Time zone: UTC+3:30 (IRST)
  - Summer (DST): UTC+4:30 (IRDT)

Sowghanlu (Persian: سوغان لو, also Romanized as Sowghānlū and Sooghanloo; also known as Sagālū, Sogānlū, and Soghānlū) is a village in Piran Rural District, in the Central District of Piranshahr County, West Azerbaijan Province, Iran. At the 2006 census, its population was 598, in 89 families.
