= Mehmandust Rural District =

Rural district in Ardabil province, Iran

Mehmandust Rural District Persian: دهستان مهماندوست
- Rural District
- Location within Iran
- Coordinates: 38°02′N 48°14′E
- Country: Iran
- Province: Ardabil
- County: Nir
- District: Kuraim
- Established: 1987
- Capital: Mehmandust-e Olya

Population (2016)
  - Total: 2,465
- Time zone: UTC+3:30 (IRST)

Mehmandust Rural District (Persian: دهستان مهماندوست) is in Kuraim District of Nir County, Ardabil province, Iran. Its capital is the village of Mehmandust-e Olya.

== Demographics ==
=== Population ===
At the time of the 2006 National Census, the rural district's population was 3,341 in 744 households. There were 3,136 inhabitants in 912 households at the following census of 2011. The 2016 census measured the population of the rural district as 2,465 in 768 households. The most populous of its 23 villages was Busjin, with 524 people.

=== Other villages in the rural district ===
- Aminabad
- Aminlu
- Aq Daraq
- Aq Guni
- Hava Daraq
- Incheh
- Jin Qeshlaqi
- Kahriz
- Khan Qeshlaqi
- Khaneh Shir
- Khvajehim
- Kolosh-e Bozorg
- Mehmandust-e Sofla
- Molla Ahmad
- Mowlan-e Olya
- Mowlan-e Sofla
- Owzan Bolagh
- Qayah Qeshlaqi
- Shamsabad
- Taj Boyuk
