= Aq Chay =

Aq Chay آق‌چای
- Village
- Location within Iran
- Coordinates: 35°28′45″N 49°06′14″E
- Country: Iran
- Province: Hamadan
- County: Razan
- Bakhsh: Central
- Rural District: Kharqan

Population (2006)
  - Total: 337
- Time zone: UTC+3:30 (IRST)
  - Summer (DST): UTC+4:30 (IRDT)

Aq Chay (Persian: آق‌چای, also Romanized as Āq Chāy; also known as Agh Chay and Āq Chāq) is a village in Kharqan Rural District, in the Central District of Razan County, Hamadan Province, Iran. At the 2006 census, its population was 337, in 59 families.
