= Yurtchi-ye Gharbi Rural District =

Rural district in Ardabil province, Iran

Yurtchi-ye Gharbi Rural District Persian: دهستان يورتچی غربی
- Rural District
- Location within Iran
- Coordinates: 37°57′N 48°00′E
- Country: Iran
- Province: Ardabil
- County: Nir
- District: Central
- Established: 1987
- Capital: Qarah Shiran

Population (2016)
  - Total: 3,266
- Time zone: UTC+3:30 (IRST)

Yurtchi-ye Gharbi Rural District (Persian: دهستان يورتچی غربی) is in the Central District of Nir County, Ardabil province, Iran. Its capital is the village of Qarah Shiran.

== Demographics ==
=== Population ===
At the time of the 2006 National Census, the rural district's population (as a part of Kuraim District) was 3,882 in 914 households. There were 3,845 inhabitants in 1,105 households at the following census of 2011. The 2016 census measured the population of the rural district as 3,266 in 1,074 households. The most populous of its 20 villages was Qarah Shiran, with 491 people.

The rural district was transferred to the Central District in 2019.

=== Other villages in the rural district ===
- Abazar
- Belqeysabad
- Borjelu
- Chehreh Barq
- Khanom Bala Kandi
- Kur Abbaslu
- Majidabad
- Mastanabad
- Mejmir
- Moshtaqin
- Saqqezchi
- Sowghanlu
- Vali Asr
