= Central District (Nir County) =

District in Ardabil province, Iran

Central District (Nir County) Persian: بخش مرکزی شهرستان نیر
- District
- Location within Iran
- Coordinates: 38°06′N 48°02′E
- Country: Iran
- Province: Ardabil
- County: Nir
- Established: 1997
- Capital: Nir

Population (2016)
  - Total: 12,190
- Time zone: UTC+3:30 (IRST)

The Central District of Nir County (Persian: بخش مرکزی شهرستان نیر) is in Ardabil province, Iran. Its capital is the city of Nir.

== History ==
Yurtchi-ye Gharbi Rural District was separated from Kuraim District to join the Central District in 2019.

== Demographics ==
=== Population ===
At the time of the 2006 National Census, the district's population was 12,607 in 3,043 households. The following census in 2011 counted 13,348 people in 3,661 households. The 2016 census measured the population of the district as 12,190 inhabitants living in 3,720 households.

=== Administrative divisions ===
Central District (Nir County) Population
Administrative Divisions	2006	2011	2016
Dursun Khvajeh RD	5,267	5,021	4,132
Rezaqoli-ye Qeshlaq RD	2,522	2,507	2,185
Yurtchi-ye Gharbi RD (Note: Transferred from Kuraim District after the 2016 census)			
Nir (city)	4,818	5,820	5,873
Total	12,607	13,348	12,190
RD = Rural District
