= Kuraim District =

District in Ardabil province, Iran

Kuraim District Persian: بخش کوراییم
- District
- Location within Iran
- Coordinates: 37°59′N 48°07′E
- Country: Iran
- Province: Ardabil
- County: Nir
- Established: 1997
- Capital: Kuraim

Population (2016)
  - Total: 8,674
- Time zone: UTC+3:30 (IRST)

Kuraim District (Persian: بخش کوراییم) is in Nir County, Ardabil province, Iran. Its capital is the city of Kuraim.

== History ==
Yurtchi-ye Gharbi Rural District was transferred to the Central District in 2019.

== Demographics ==
=== Population ===
At the time of the 2006 National Census, the district's population was 10,966 in 2,368 households. The following census in 2011 counted 10,308 people in 2,865 households. The 2016 census measured the population of the district as 8,674 inhabitants living in 2,644 households.

=== Administrative divisions ===
Kuraim District Population
Administrative Divisions	2006	2011	2016
Mehmandust RD	3,341	3,136	2,465
Yurtchi-ye Gharbi RD (Note: Transferred to the Central District after the 2016 census)	3,882	3,845	3,266
Yurtchi-ye Sharqi RD	2,962	2,473	2,112
Kuraim (city)	781	854	831
Total	10,966	10,308	8,674
RD = Rural District
