= Nir County =

County in Ardabil province, Iran

Nir County Persian: شهرستان نیر
- County
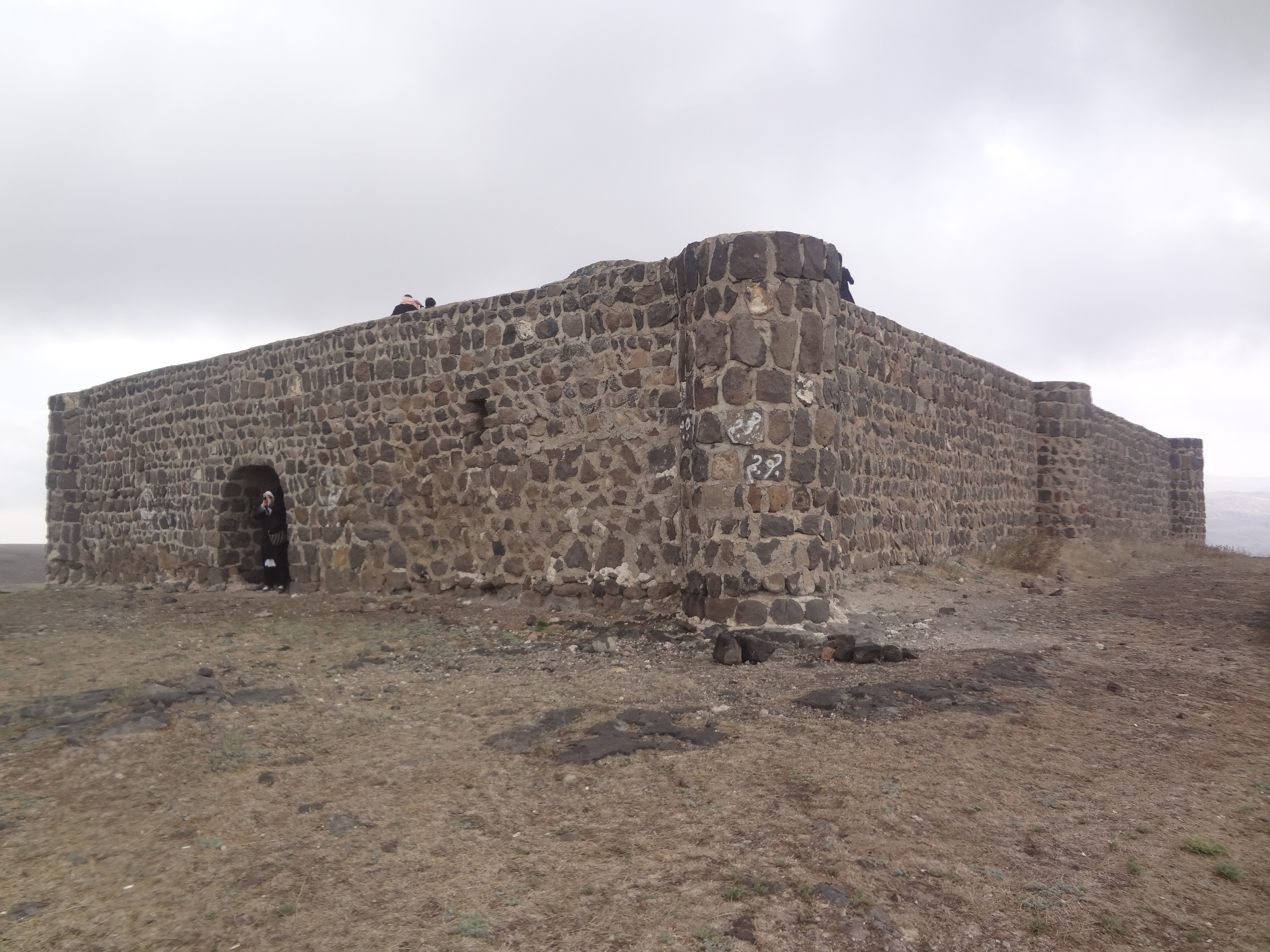
- Sa'in Caravanserai is 10km along the old road from Nir County to Sarab

- Location of Nir County in Ardabil province (bottom, yellow)

- Location of Ardabil province in Iran
- Coordinates: 37°58′N 48°09′E
- Country: Iran
- Province: Ardabil
- Established: 1997
- Capital: Nir
- Districts: Central, Kuraim

Population (2016)
  - Total: 20,864
- Time zone: UTC+3:30 (IRST)

Nir County (Persian: شهرستان نیر) is in Ardabil province, Iran. Its capital is the city of Nir.

== History ==
Yurtchi-ye Gharbi Rural District was separated from Kuraim District to join the Central District in 2019.

== Demographics ==
=== Population ===
At the time of the 2006 National Census, the county's population was 23,573 in 5,411 households. The following census in 2011 counted 23,656 people in 6,515 households. The 2016 census measured the population of the county as 20,864 in 6,364 households.

=== Administrative divisions ===
Nir County's population history and administrative structure over three consecutive censuses are shown in the following table.

Nir County Population
Administrative Divisions	2006	2011	2016
Central District	12,607	13,348	12,190
Dursun Khvajeh RD	5,267	5,021	4,132
Rezaqoli-ye Qeshlaq RD	2,522	2,507	2,185
Yurtchi-ye Gharbi RD			
Nir (city)	4,818	5,820	5,873
Kuraim District	10,966	10,308	8,674
Mehmandust RD	3,341	3,136	2,465
Yurtchi-ye Gharbi RD (Note: Transferred to the Central District after the 2016 census)	3,882	3,845	3,266
Yurtchi-ye Sharqi RD	2,962	2,473	2,112
Kuraim (city)	781	854	831
Total	23,573	23,656	20,864
RD = Rural District

== See also ==
Media related to Nir County at Wikimedia Commons
