= Valin =

Valin may refer to:

== Places ==
=== Canada ===
- Mount Valin, the highest mountain of the Saguenay–Lac-Saint-Jean in Quebec
- Monts-Valin National Park, national park in Quebec
- Mont-Valin, Quebec, unorganized territory in Quebec
- Zec Martin-Valin, a controlled harvesting zone, in Le Fjord-du-Saguenay, Saguenay-Lac-Saint-Jean, Quebec
- Martin-Valin Lake, a body of water on the Bras des Canots in Mont-Valin, Le Fjord-du-Saguenay, Saguenay-Lac-Saint-Jean, Quebec
- Valin River (disambiguation)

=== France ===
- Boulevard du Général-Martial-Valin, one of the Boulevards of the Marshals in Paris

=== Iran ===
- Valin, Iran, a village in East Azerbaijan Province
- Valin Jeq, a village in East Azerbaijan Province

== Other uses ==
- Valin v Langlois, Canadian constitutional law decision
- Valin Bodie (born 1995), Bahamian footballer
- Valin (surname)
- Hunan Valin Steel, Chinese steel company

== See also ==
- Valine, a chemical compound
