= Bulalu =

Bulalu بولالو
- Village
- Location within Iran
- Coordinates: 37°29′53″N 45°55′16″E
- Country: Iran
- Province: East Azerbaijan
- County: Ajab Shir
- Bakhsh: Central
- Rural District: Dizajrud-e Gharbi

Population (2006)
  - Total: 406
- Time zone: UTC+3:30 (IRST)
  - Summer (DST): UTC+4:30 (IRDT)

Bulalu (Persian: بولالو, also Romanized as Būlālū) is a village in Dizajrud-e Gharbi Rural District, in the Central District of Ajab Shir County, East Azerbaijan Province, Iran. At the 2006 census, its population was 406, in 66 families.
