= Qobadlu =

Qobadlu قبادلو
- Village
- Location within Iran
- Coordinates: 37°32′50″N 45°45′18″E
- Country: Iran
- Province: East Azerbaijan
- County: Ajab Shir
- Bakhsh: Central
- Rural District: Dizajrud-e Gharbi

Population (2006)
  - Total: 330
- Time zone: UTC+3:30 (IRST)
  - Summer (DST): UTC+4:30 (IRDT)

Qobadlu (Persian: قبادلو, also Romanized as Qobādlū) is a village in Dizajrud-e Gharbi Rural District, in the Central District of Ajab Shir County, East Azerbaijan Province, Iran. At the 2006 census, its population was 330, in 76 families.
