= Heravan =

Heravan هروان
- Village
- Location within Iran
- Coordinates: 37°26′36″N 45°53′22″E
- Country: Iran
- Province: East Azerbaijan
- County: Ajab Shir
- Bakhsh: Central
- Rural District: Dizajrud-e Gharbi

Population (2006)
  - Total: 450
- Time zone: UTC+3:30 (IRST)
  - Summer (DST): UTC+4:30 (IRDT)

Heravan (Persian: هروان, also Romanized as Heravān) is a village in Dizajrud-e Gharbi Rural District, in the Central District of Ajab Shir County, East Azerbaijan Province, Iran. At the 2006 census, its population was 450, in 106 families.
