= Khanian, East Azerbaijan =

Village in East Azerbaijan province, Iran

Khanian Persian: خانيان
- Village
- Location within Iran
- Coordinates: 37°28′51″N 45°55′36″E
- Country: Iran
- Province: East Azerbaijan
- County: Ajab Shir
- District: Central
- Rural District: Dizajrud-e Gharbi

Population (2016)
  - Total: 1,014
- Time zone: UTC+3:30 (IRST)

Khanian (Persian: خانيان) (Note: Also romanized as Khāneyān, Khānīān, and Khānīyān) is a village in, and the capital of, Dizajrud-e Gharbi Rural District in the Central District of Ajab Shir County, East Azerbaijan province, Iran. The previous capital of the rural district was the village of Shishavan, now a neighborhood in the city of Ajab Shir.

== Demographics ==
=== Population ===
At the time of the 2006 National Census, the village's population was 1,118 in 272 households. The following census in 2011 counted 1,032 people in 298 households. The 2016 census measured the population of the village as 1,014 people in 338 households.
