= Chupankareh =

Chupankareh چوپانكره
- Village
- Location within Iran
- Coordinates: 37°32′06″N 45°52′29″E
- Country: Iran
- Province: East Azerbaijan
- County: Ajab Shir
- Bakhsh: Central
- Rural District: Dizajrud-e Gharbi

Population (2006)
  - Total: 258
- Time zone: UTC+3:30 (IRST)
  - Summer (DST): UTC+4:30 (IRDT)

Chupankareh (Persian: چوپانكره, also Romanized as Chūpānkareh; also known as Chūbānkareh) is a village in Dizajrud-e Gharbi Rural District, in the Central District of Ajab Shir County, East Azerbaijan Province, Iran. At the 2006 census, its population was 258, in 67 families.
