= Shishavan =

Neighborhood in East Azerbaijan province, Iran

Shishavan Persian: شيشوان
- Neighborhood
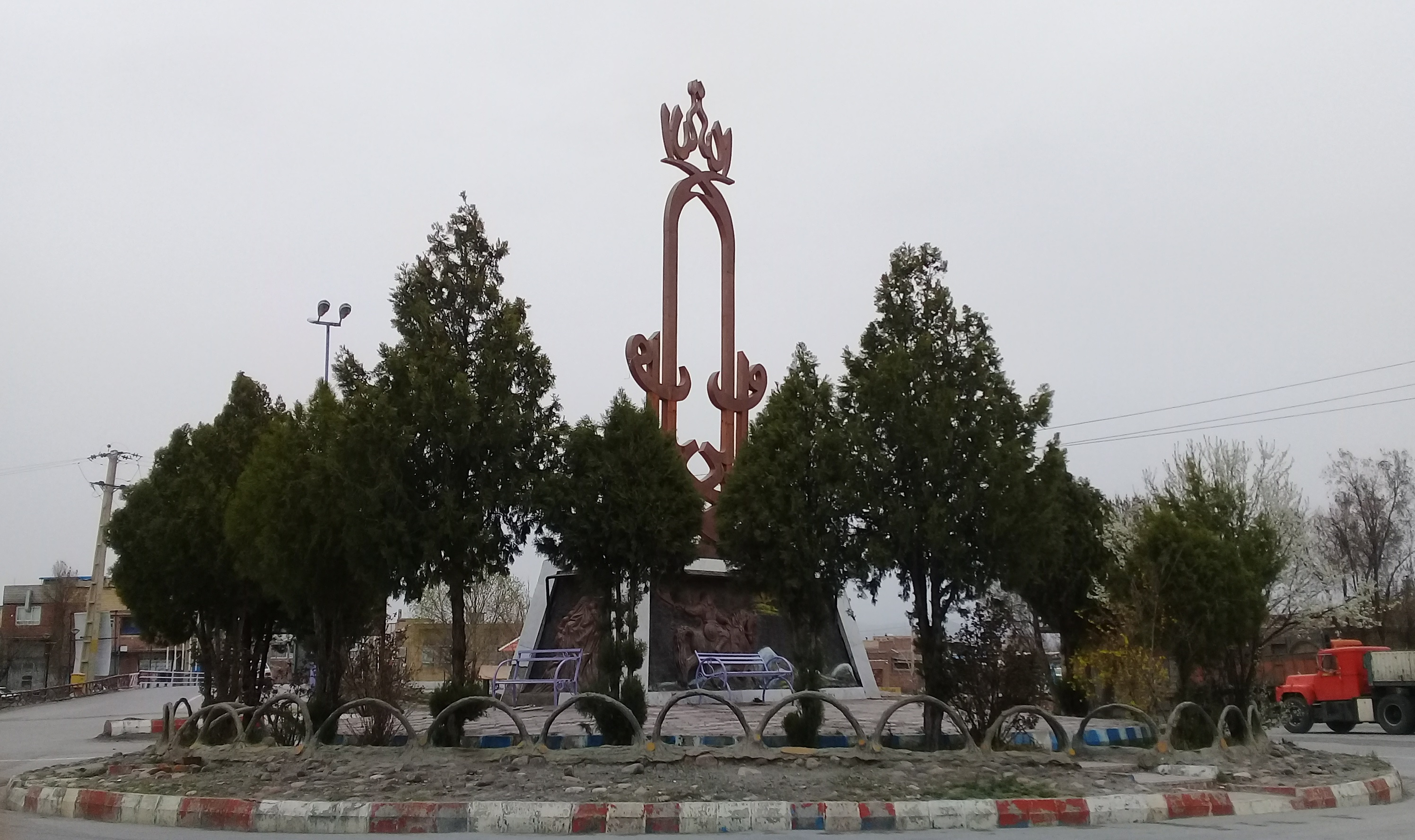

- Location within Iran
- Coordinates: 37°27′44″N 45°53′09″E
- Country: Iran
- Province: East Azerbaijan
- County: Ajab Shir
- District: Central
- City: Ajab Shir

Population (2011)
  - Total: 3,737
- Time zone: UTC+3:30 (IRST)

Shishavan (Persian: شيشوان) (Note: Also romanized as Shīshavān) is a neighborhood in the city of Ajab Shir in the Central District of Ajab Shir County, East Azerbaijan province, Iran. As a village, it was the capital of Dizajrud-e Gharbi Rural District until its capital was transferred to the village of Khanian.

== Demographics ==
=== Population ===
At the time of the 2006 National Census, Shishavan's population was 3,074 in 850 households, when it was a village in Dizajrud-e Gharbi Rural District. The following census in 2011 counted 3,737 people in 1,049 households. Shishavan was annexed by the city of Ajab Shir in 2013.
