= Rahmanlu =

Rahmanlu رحمانلو
- Village
- Location within Iran
- Coordinates: 37°31′06″N 45°48′34″E
- Country: Iran
- Province: East Azerbaijan
- County: Ajab Shir
- Bakhsh: Central
- Rural District: Dizajrud-e Gharbi

Population (2006)
  - Total: 363
- Time zone: UTC+3:30 (IRST)
  - Summer (DST): UTC+4:30 (IRDT)

Rahmanlu (Persian: رحمانلو, also Romanized as Raḩmānlū; also known as Bandar-e-Rahmānlū and Rakhmanlu) is a village in Dizajrud-e Gharbi Rural District, in the Central District of Ajab Shir County, East Azerbaijan Province, Iran. At the 2006 census, its population was 363, in 84 families.
