= Mehmandar, Iran =

Mehmandar (Persian: مهماندار) in Iran may refer to:

- Mehmandar, East Azerbaijan
- Mehmandar-e Olya, East Azerbaijan Province
- Mehmandar-e Sofla, East Azerbaijan Province
- Mehmandar, West Azerbaijan
- Mehmandar, Zanjan

== Also ==
- Mehmandar (disambiguation)
