= Chahar Barud =

Village in East Azerbaijan province, Iran

Chahar Barud Persian: چهاربرود
- Village
- Location within Iran
- Coordinates: 37°39′30″N 46°10′21″E
- Country: Iran
- Province: East Azerbaijan
- County: Ajab Shir
- District: Qaleh Chay
- Rural District: Kuhestan

Population (2016)
  - Total: 855
- Time zone: UTC+3:30 (IRST)

Chahar Barud (Persian: چهاربرود) (Note: Also romanized as Chahār Barūd; also known as Charūrī (چروري)) is a village in Kuhestan Rural District of Qaleh Chay District in Ajab Shir County, East Azerbaijan province, Iran.

== Demographics ==
=== Population ===
At the time of the 2006 National Census, the village's population was 743 in 165 households. The following census in 2011 counted 855 people in 213 households. The 2016 census measured the population of the village as 855 people in 235 households.
