= JAQ =

JAQ may refer to:

- JAQ (b-boy) (born 1979), American breakdancer, writer and MC
- Just Asking Questions, a pseudoskeptical tactic
- Jaq Chartier (born 1961), American visual artist
- Alin Jaq, a village in East Azerbaijan, Iran
- Amador County Airport, in California, United States
- Jacquinot Bay Airport, in Papua New Guinea
- Yaqay language of Indonesia
