= Aqcheh Owbeh =

Village in East Azerbaijan province, Iran

Aqcheh Owbeh Persian: اقچه اوبه
- Village
- Location within Iran
- Coordinates: 37°30′29″N 45°51′23″E
- Country: Iran
- Province: East Azerbaijan
- County: Ajab Shir
- District: Central
- Rural District: Dizajrud-e Gharbi

Population (2016)
  - Total: 629
- Time zone: UTC+3:30 (IRST)

Aqcheh Owbeh (Persian: اقچه اوبه) (Note: Also romanized as Āqcheh Owbeh; also known as Āghjeh Owbeh) is a village in Dizajrud-e Gharbi Rural District of the Central District in Ajab Shir County, East Azerbaijan province, Iran.

== Demographics ==
=== Population ===
At the time of the 2006 National Census, the village's population was 521 in 144 households. The following census in 2011 counted 607 people in 187 households. The 2016 census measured the population of the village as 629 people in 206 households.
