= Mehrabad, East Azerbaijan =

Village in East Azerbaijan province, Iran

Mehrabad Persian: مهراباد
- Village
- Location within Iran
- Coordinates: 37°26′45″N 45°52′59″E
- Country: Iran
- Province: East Azerbaijan
- County: Ajab Shir
- District: Central
- Rural District: Dizajrud-e Gharbi

Population (2016)
  - Total: 565
- Time zone: UTC+3:30 (IRST)

Mehrabad (Persian: مهراباد) (Note: Also romanized as Mehrābād) is a village in Dizajrud-e Gharbi Rural District of the Central District in Ajab Shir County, East Azerbaijan province, Iran.

== Demographics ==
=== Population ===
At the time of the 2006 National Census, the village's population was 642 in 157 households. The following census in 2011 counted 588 people in 186 households. The 2016 census measured the population of the village as 565 people in 190 households.
