= Khezerlu (disambiguation) =

Khezerlu is a city in East Azerbaijan Province, Iran.

Khezerlu or Khezerloo (Persian: خضرلو) may also refer to:

- Khezerlu, Chaldoran, West Azerbaijan Province
- Khezerlu, Showt, West Azerbaijan Province
- Khezerlu Rural District, in East Azerbaijan Province
