= Gowravan =

Village in East Azerbaijan province, Iran

Gowravan Persian: گوراوان
- Village
- Location within Iran
- Coordinates: 37°27′04″N 45°54′17″E
- Country: Iran
- Province: East Azerbaijan
- County: Ajab Shir
- District: Central
- Rural District: Dizajrud-e Gharbi

Population (2016)
  - Total: 1,172
- Time zone: UTC+3:30 (IRST)

Gowravan (Persian: گوراوان) (Note: Also romanized as Gowrāvān and Gowravān; also known as Gurvan (گوروان)) is a village in Dizajrud-e Gharbi Rural District of the Central District in Ajab Shir County, East Azerbaijan province, Iran.

== Demographics ==
=== Population ===
At the time of the 2006 National Census, the village's population was 1,288 in 306 households. The following census in 2011 counted 1,218 people in 358 households. The 2016 census measured the population of the village as 1,172 people in 369 households.
