= Danalu =

Village in East Azerbaijan province, Iran

Danalu Persian: دانالو
- Village
- Location within Iran
- Coordinates: 37°29′10″N 45°50′31″E
- Country: Iran
- Province: East Azerbaijan
- County: Ajab Shir
- District: Central
- Rural District: Dizajrud-e Gharbi

Population (2016)
  - Total: 551
- Time zone: UTC+3:30 (IRST)

Danalu (Persian: دانالو) (Note: Also romanized as Dānālū; also known as Denelau) is a village in Dizajrud-e Gharbi Rural District of the Central District in Ajab Shir County, East Azerbaijan province, Iran.

== Demographics ==
=== Population ===
At the time of the 2006 National Census, the village's population was 521 in 137 households. The following census in 2011 counted 562 people in 165 households. The 2016 census measured the population of the village as 551 people in 172 households.
