= Dizajrud =

Dizajrud (Persian: ديزجرود) may refer to:

- Dizajrud-e Gharbi Rural District
- Dizajrud-e Sharqi Rural District
