= Chenar, Ajab Shir =

Village in East Azerbaijan province, Iran

Chenar Persian: چنار
- Village
- Location within Iran
- Coordinates: 37°35′14″N 46°02′05″E
- Country: Iran
- Province: East Azerbaijan
- County: Ajab Shir
- District: Qaleh Chay
- Rural District: Dizajrud-e Sharqi

Population (2016)
  - Total: 1,277
- Time zone: UTC+3:30 (IRST)

Chenar (Persian: چنار) (Note: Also romanized as Chenār) is a village in Dizajrud-e Sharqi Rural District of Qaleh Chay District in Ajab Shir County, East Azerbaijan province, Iran.

== Demographics ==
=== Population ===
At the time of the 2006 National Census, the village's population was 1,173 in 279 households. The following census in 2011 counted 1,118 people in 272 households. The 2016 census measured the population of the village as 1,277 people in 370 households. It was the most populous village in its rural district.
