= Dizaj-e Hasan Beyg =

Village in East Azerbaijan province, Iran

Dizaj-e Hasan Beyg Persian: ديزج حسن بيگ
- Village
- Location within Iran
- Coordinates: 37°31′53″N 46°00′13″E
- Country: Iran
- Province: East Azerbaijan
- County: Ajab Shir
- District: Qaleh Chay
- Rural District: Dizajrud-e Sharqi

Population (2016)
  - Total: 483
- Time zone: UTC+3:30 (IRST)

Dizaj-e Hasan Beyg (Persian: ديزج حسن بيگ) (Note: Also romanized as Dīzaj-e Ḩasan Beyg) is a village in Dizajrud-e Sharqi Rural District of Qaleh Chay District in Ajab Shir County, East Azerbaijan province, Iran.

== Demographics ==
=== Population ===
At the time of the 2006 National Census, the village's population was 615 in 117 households. The following census in 2011 counted 476 people in 134 households. The 2016 census measured the population of the village as 483 people in 144 households.
