= Quzlujeh, Ajab Shir =

Village in East Azerbaijan province, Iran

Quzlujeh Persian: قوزلوجه
- Village
- Location within Iran
- Coordinates: 37°34′15″N 46°10′54″E
- Country: Iran
- Province: East Azerbaijan
- County: Ajab Shir
- District: Qaleh Chay
- Rural District: Kuhestan

Population (2016)
  - Total: 1,245
- Time zone: UTC+3:30 (IRST)

Quzlujeh (Persian: قوزلوجه) (Note: Also romanized as Qūzlūjeh and Qūzūljeh) is a village in Kuhestan Rural District of Qaleh Chay District in Ajab Shir County, East Azerbaijan province, Iran.

== Demographics ==
=== Population ===
At the time of the 2006 National Census, the village's population was 1,320 in 312 households. The following census in 2011 counted 1,253 people in 352 households. The 2016 census measured the population of the village as 1,245 people in 381 households.
