= Chahar Taq, East Azerbaijan =

Village in East Azerbaijan province, Iran

Chahar Taq Persian: چهارطاق
- Village
- Location within Iran
- Coordinates: 37°32′02″N 46°12′33″E
- Country: Iran
- Province: East Azerbaijan
- County: Ajab Shir
- District: Qaleh Chay
- Rural District: Kuhestan

Population (2016)
  - Total: 0
- Time zone: UTC+3:30 (IRST)

Chahar Taq (Persian: چهارطاق) (Note: Also romanized as Chāhār Ţāq; also known as Chāţāq) is a village in Kuhestan Rural District of Qaleh Chay District in Ajab Shir County, East Azerbaijan province, Iran.

== Demographics ==
=== Population ===
At the time of the 2006 National Census, the village's population was 235 in 49 households. The village did not appear in the following census of 2011. The 2016 census measured the population of the village as zero.
