= Huri, Iran =

Village in East Azerbaijan province, Iran

Huri Persian: حوري
- Village
- Location within Iran
- Coordinates: 37°32′35″N 46°03′01″E
- Country: Iran
- Province: East Azerbaijan
- County: Ajab Shir
- District: Qaleh Chay
- Rural District: Dizajrud-e Sharqi

Population (2016)
  - Total: 718
- Time zone: UTC+3:30 (IRST)

Huri (Persian: حوري) (Note: Also romanized as Ḩūrī; also known as Dīlanchī-ye Arkhī-ye Pā’īn) is a village in Dizajrud-e Sharqi Rural District of Qaleh Chay District in Ajab Shir County, East Azerbaijan province, Iran.

== Demographics ==
=== Population ===
At the time of the 2006 National Census, the village's population was 1,041 in 200 households. The following census in 2011 counted 681 people in 150 households. The 2016 census measured the population of the village as 718 people in 201 households.
