= Razian, East Azerbaijan =

Village in East Azerbaijan province, Iran

Razian Persian: رازيان
- Village
- Location within Iran
- Coordinates: 37°25′00″N 45°55′56″E
- Country: Iran
- Province: East Azerbaijan
- County: Ajab Shir
- District: Central
- Rural District: Khezerlu

Population (2016)
  - Total: 766
- Time zone: UTC+3:30 (IRST)

Razian (Persian: رازيان) (Note: Also romanized as Rāzīān) is a village in Khezerlu Rural District of the Central District in Ajab Shir County, East Azerbaijan province, Iran.

== Demographics ==
=== Population ===
At the time of the 2006 National Census, the village's population was 990 in 238 households. The following census in 2011 counted 811 people in 226 households. The 2016 census measured the population of the village as 766 people in 230 households.
