= Barazlu =

Village in East Azerbaijan province, Iran

Barazlu Persian: بارازلو
- Village
- Location within Iran
- Coordinates: 37°32′32″N 46°09′05″E
- Country: Iran
- Province: East Azerbaijan
- County: Ajab Shir
- District: Qaleh Chay
- Rural District: Kuhestan

Population (2016)
  - Total: 540
- Time zone: UTC+3:30 (IRST)

Barazlu (Persian: بارازلو) (Note: Also romanized as Bārāzlū; also known as Bārāz and Bāzār (بازار)) is a village in Kuhestan Rural District of Qaleh Chay District in Ajab Shir County, East Azerbaijan province, Iran.

== Demographics ==
=== Population ===
At the time of the 2006 National Census, the village's population was 660 in 158 households. The following census in 2011 counted 567 people in 108 households. The 2016 census measured the population of the village as 540 people in 162 households.
