= Yaychi, East Azerbaijan =

Village in East Azerbaijan province, Iran

Yaychi Persian: يايچي
- Village
- Location within Iran
- Coordinates: 37°36′35″N 46°10′58″E
- Country: Iran
- Province: East Azerbaijan
- County: Ajab Shir
- District: Qaleh Chay
- Rural District: Kuhestan

Population (2016)
  - Total: 1,225
- Time zone: UTC+3:30 (IRST)

Yaychi (Persian: يايچي) (Note: Also romanized as Yāychī) is a village in Kuhestan Rural District of Qaleh Chay District in Ajab Shir County, East Azerbaijan province, Iran.

== Demographics ==
=== Population ===
At the time of the 2006 National Census, the village's population was 1,114 in 264 households. The following census in 2011 counted 1,113 people in 301 households. The 2016 census measured the population of the village as 1,225 people in 341 households.
