= Hargalan =

Village in East Azerbaijan province, Iran

Hargalan Persian: هرگلان
- Village
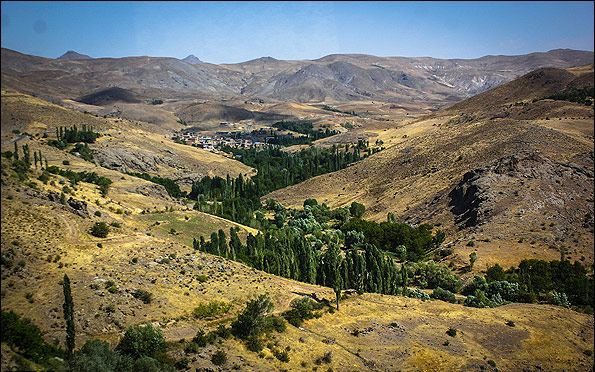
- The village of Hargalan

- Location within Iran
- Coordinates: 37°38′26″N 46°13′17″E
- Country: Iran
- Province: East Azerbaijan
- County: Ajab Shir
- District: Qaleh Chay
- Rural District: Kuhestan

Population (2016)
  - Total: 3,371
- Time zone: UTC+3:30 (IRST)

Hargalan (Persian: هرگلان) (Note: Also romanized as Har Golān and Hargalān) is a village in Kuhestan Rural District of Qaleh Chay District in Ajab Shir County, East Azerbaijan province, Iran.

== Demographics ==
=== Population ===
At the time of the 2006 National Census, the village's population was 3,494 in 756 households. The following census in 2011 counted 3,152 people in 833 households. The 2016 census measured the population of the village as 3,371 people in 955 households. It was the most populous village in its rural district.
