= Valin Jeq =

Valin Jeq ولينجق
- Village
- Location within Iran
- Coordinates: 37°28′52″N 45°57′00″E
- Country: Iran
- Province: East Azerbaijan
- County: Ajab Shir
- Bakhsh: Qaleh Chay
- Rural District: Dizajrud-e Sharqi

Population (2006)
  - Total: 509
- Time zone: UTC+3:30 (IRST)
  - Summer (DST): UTC+4:30 (IRDT)

Valin Jeq (Persian: ولينجق, also Romanized as Valīn Jeq; also known as Varīnjeq) is a village in Dizajrud-e Sharqi Rural District, Qaleh Chay District, Ajab Shir County, East Azerbaijan Province, Iran. As per the 2006 census, its population was 509, in 115 families.
