= Gol Tappeh, Ajab Shir =

Village in East Azerbaijan province, Iran

Gol Tappeh Persian: گل تپه
- Village
- Location within Iran
- Coordinates: 37°27′52″N 45°55′29″E
- Country: Iran
- Province: East Azerbaijan
- County: Ajab Shir
- District: Central
- Rural District: Dizajrud-e Gharbi

Population (2016)
  - Total: 1,043
- Time zone: UTC+3:30 (IRST)

Gol Tappeh (Persian: گل تپه) is a village in Dizajrud-e Gharbi Rural District of the Central District in Ajab Shir County, East Azerbaijan province, Iran.

== Demographics ==
=== Population ===
At the time of the 2006 National Census, the village's population was 1,549 in 339 households. The following census in 2011 counted 1,010 people in 305 households. The 2016 census measured the population of the village as 1,043 people in 353 households.
