= Nansa =

Village in East Azerbaijan province, Iran

Nansa Persian: نانسا
- Village
- Location within Iran
- Coordinates: 37°25′53″N 45°55′31″E
- Country: Iran
- Province: East Azerbaijan
- County: Ajab Shir
- District: Central
- Rural District: Khezerlu

Population (2016)
  - Total: 790
- Time zone: UTC+3:30 (IRST)

Nansa (Persian: نانسا) (Note: Also romanized as Nānsā’) is a village in Khezerlu Rural District of the Central District in Ajab Shir County, East Azerbaijan province, Iran.

== Demographics ==
=== Population ===
At the time of the 2006 National Census, the village's population was 899 in 234 households. The following census in 2011 counted 781 people in 242 households. The 2016 census measured the population of the village as 790 people in 245 households.
