= Bukat =

Village in East Azerbaijan province, Iran

Bukat Persian: بوكت
- Village
- Location within Iran
- Coordinates: 37°33′04″N 45°59′17″E
- Country: Iran
- Province: East Azerbaijan
- County: Ajab Shir
- District: Qaleh Chay
- Rural District: Dizajrud-e Sharqi

Population (2016)
  - Total: 463
- Time zone: UTC+3:30 (IRST)

Bukat (Persian: بوكت) (Note: Also romanized as Booket, and Būkat, and Būket; also known as Boviat) is a village in Dizajrud-e Sharqi Rural District of Qaleh Chay District in Ajab Shir County, East Azerbaijan province, Iran.

== Demographics ==
=== Population ===
At the time of the 2006 National Census, the village's population was 699 in 167 households. The following census in 2011 counted 554 people in 192 households. The 2016 census measured the population of the village as 463 people in 167 households.
