= Almalu, Ajab Shir =

Village in East Azerbaijan province, Iran

Almalu Persian: المالو
- Village
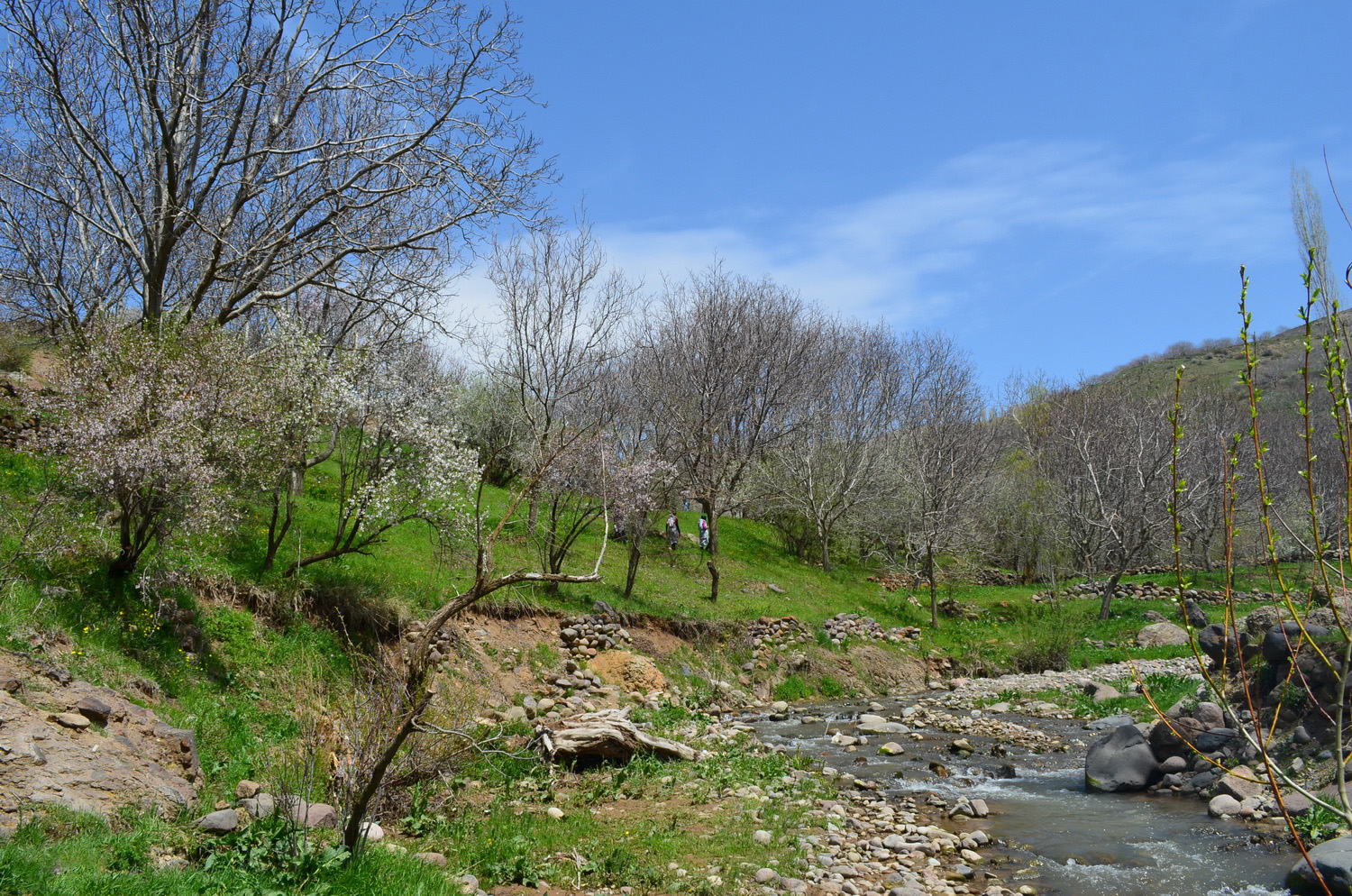
- The village of Almalu

- Location within Iran
- Coordinates: 37°35′55″N 46°13′21″E
- Country: Iran
- Province: East Azerbaijan
- County: Ajab Shir
- District: Qaleh Chay
- Rural District: Kuhestan

Population (2016)
  - Total: 1,452
- Time zone: UTC+3:30 (IRST)

Almalu (Persian: المالو) (Note: Also romanized as Ālmālū; also known as Almāli Bāsh, Ālmālū Bāsh, Alniāli-bāsh, and Bāsh Ālmālū (باش المالو)) is a village in Kuhestan Rural District of Qaleh Chay District in Ajab Shir County, East Azerbaijan province, Iran.

== Demographics ==
=== Population ===
At the time of the 2006 National Census, the village's population was 1,386 in 308 households. The following census in 2011 counted 1,482 people in 376 households. The 2016 census measured the population of the village as 1,452 people in 402 households.
