= Shiraz, East Azerbaijan =

Village in East Azerbaijan province, Iran

Shiraz Persian: شيراز
- Village
- Location within Iran
- Coordinates: 37°26′10″N 45°54′34″E
- Country: Iran
- Province: East Azerbaijan
- County: Ajab Shir
- District: Central
- Rural District: Khezerlu

Population (2016)
  - Total: 1,995
- Time zone: UTC+3:30 (IRST)

Shiraz (Persian: شيراز) (Note: Also romanized as Shīrāz) is a village in Khezerlu Rural District of the Central District in Ajab Shir County, East Azerbaijan province, Iran.

== Demographics ==
=== Population ===
At the time of the 2006 National Census, the village's population was 2,244 in 582 households. The following census in 2011 counted 2,143 people in 679 households. The 2016 census measured the population of the village as 1,995 people in 679 households.
