= Nebrin =

Village in East Azerbaijan province, Iran

Nebrin Persian: نبرين
- Village
- Location within Iran
- Coordinates: 37°26′14″N 45°56′30″E
- Country: Iran
- Province: East Azerbaijan
- County: Ajab Shir
- District: Central
- Rural District: Dizajrud-e Gharbi

Population (2016)
  - Total: 811
- Time zone: UTC+3:30 (IRST)

Nebrin (Persian: نبرين) (Note: Also romanized as Nebrīn) is a village in Dizajrud-e Gharbi Rural District of the Central District in Ajab Shir County, East Azerbaijan province, Iran.

== Demographics ==
=== Population ===
At the time of the 2006 National Census, the village's population was 974 in 225 households. The following census in 2011 counted 864 people in 251 households. The 2016 census measured the population of the village as 811 people in 274 households.
