= Yengejeh, Ajab Shir =

Village in East Azerbaijan province, Iran

Yengejeh Persian: ینگجه
- Village
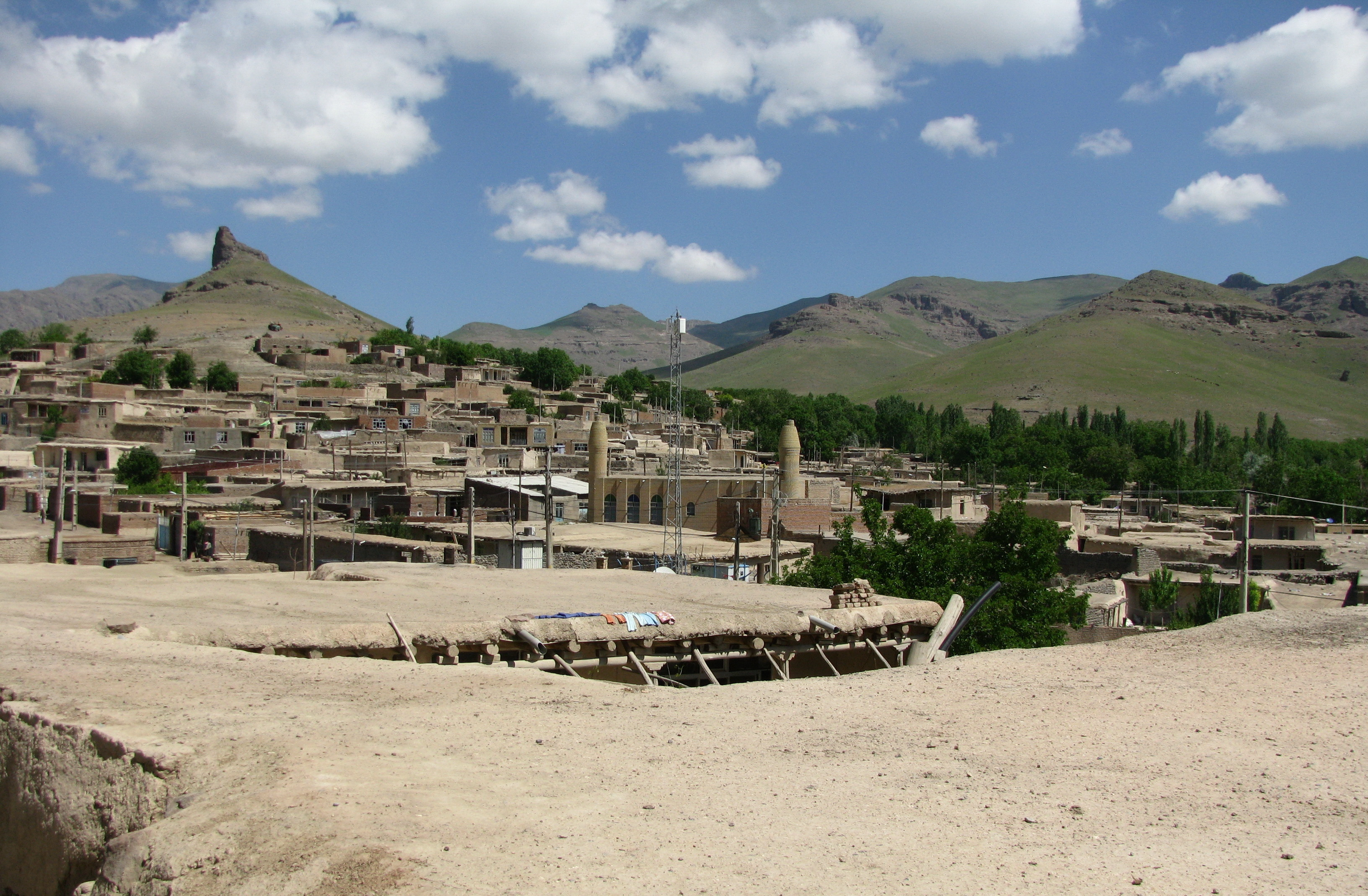
- The village of Yengejeh, Ajab Shir

- Location within Iran
- Coordinates: 37°32′24″N 46°07′55″E
- Country: Iran
- Province: East Azerbaijan
- County: Ajab Shir
- District: Qaleh Chay
- Rural District: Kuhestan

Population (2016)
  - Total: 780
- Time zone: UTC+3:30 (IRST)

Yengejeh (Persian: ینگجه) is a village in, and the capital of, Kuhestan Rural District in Qaleh Chay District of Ajab Shir County, East Azerbaijan province, Iran.

== Demographics ==
=== Population ===
At the time of the 2006 National Census, the village's population was 858 in 199 households. The following census in 2011 counted 768 people in 223 households. The 2016 census measured the population of the village as 780 people in 252 households.
