= Posyan, Ajab Shir =

Village in East Azerbaijan province, Iran

Posyan Persian: پسيان
- Village
- Location within Iran
- Coordinates: 37°24′50″N 45°54′38″E
- Country: Iran
- Province: East Azerbaijan
- County: Ajab Shir
- District: Central
- Rural District: Khezerlu

Population (2016)
  - Total: 435
- Time zone: UTC+3:30 (IRST)

Posyan (Persian: پسيان) (Note: Also romanized as Posyān; also known as Pīrmow’men) is a village in Khezerlu Rural District of the Central District in Ajab Shir County, East Azerbaijan province, Iran.

== Demographics ==
=== Population ===
At the time of the 2006 National Census, the village's population was 556 in 131 households. The following census in 2011 counted 520 people in 133 households. The 2016 census measured the population of the village as 435 people in 126 households.
