= Khezerlu =

Village in East Azerbaijan province, Iran

Khezerlu Persian: خضرلو
- Village
- Location within Iran
- Coordinates: 37°25′50″N 45°57′33″E
- Country: Iran
- Province: East Azerbaijan
- County: Ajab Shir
- District: Central
- Rural District: Khezerlu

Population (2016)
  - Total: 3,505
- Time zone: UTC+3:30 (IRST)

Khezerlu (Persian: خضرلو) (Note: Also romanized as Kheẕerlū, Khezerlū, and Khezrlu) is a village in, and the capital of, Khezerlu Rural District in the Central District of Ajab Shir County, East Azerbaijan province, Iran.

== Demographics ==
=== Population ===
At the time of the 2006 National Census, the village's population was 3,746 in 848 households. The following census in 2011 counted 3,575 people in 1,067 households. The 2016 census measured the population of the village as 3,505 people in 1,115 households. It was the most populous village in its rural district.
