= Posyan =

Posyan or Pesyan (Persian: پسيان) may refer to:

- Posyan, Ajab Shir
- Pesyan, Khoda Afarin
