= Mehmandar (disambiguation) =

Mehmandar is a town in the Ararat Province of Armenia.

Mehmandar may also refer to:

- Mehmandar, East Azerbaijan, a village in Dizajrud-e Sharqi Rural District, Qaleh Chay District, Ajab Shir County, East Azerbaijan Province, Iran
- Mehmandar, West Azerbaijan, a village in Beygom Qaleh Rural District, in the Central District of Naqadeh County, West Azerbaijan Province, Iran

== Also ==
- Mehmandar, Iran (disambiguation)
