= Javan Qaleh =

City in East Azerbaijan province, Iran

Javan Qaleh Persian: جوان قلعه
- City
- Location within Iran
- Coordinates: 37°29′48″N 45°58′24″E
- Country: Iran
- Province: East Azerbaijan
- County: Ajab Shir
- District: Qaleh Chay
- Established as a city: 2013

Population (2016)
  - Total: 700
- Time zone: UTC+3:30 (IRST)

Javan Qaleh (Persian: جوان قلعه) (Note: Also romanized as Javān Qal‘eh and Javānqal‘eh; also known as Gown Maḥalleh (گون محله)) is a city in, and the capital of, Qaleh Chay District in Ajab Shir County, East Azerbaijan province, Iran. It also serves as the administrative center for Dizajrud-e Sharqi Rural District.

== Demographics ==
=== Population ===
At the time of the 2006 National Census, Javan Qaleh's population was 622 in 133 households, when it was a village in Dizajrud-e Sharqi Rural District. The following census in 2011 counted 589 people in 167 households. The 2016 census measured the population as 700 people in 213 households, by which time Javan Qaleh had been converted to a city.
