= Jaq Chartier =

American visual artist born 1961

- Born: November 30, 1961 (age 64)
- Education: University of Massachusetts, BFA University of Washington, MFA
- Known for: Visual artworks

Jaq Chartier (born 1961) is an American visual artist. Chartier gained recognition for her Testing series, abstract paintings that are also active visual records of Chartier's tests of her materials - how they migrate and change in reaction to each other, sunlight, and the passage of time.

Chartier's artworks have been exhibited in museums and galleries worldwide.

== Education ==
Chartier received her BFA in Painting from the University of Massachusetts in 1984, and her MFA from the University of Washington in 1994.

== Testing series and central themes ==
In 1997, while Chartier was an instructor for the Golden Artist Colors Working Artists Program, she was often asked about the differences between the colors and finishes of various paints. Chartier created sample boards to test the paint products and demonstrate colors and finishes in side-by-side comparisons. While preparing the sample boards, Chartier arrived at her idea to create artworks from her tests. This led to Chartier's well-known body of work the artist later titled Testing.

To produce her Testing paintings, Chartier applies her own formulas of inks, stains, and dyes often made from non-art materials such as furniture stains or fabric dyes, onto gessoed panels in a predetermined composition. She relies on chance and the unpredictability of her materials “to do things paint can't do – change, shift, and migrate through other layers of paint, or separate into component parts with differing properties.” Scientific images inspire the visual compositions of her paintings in which the colors “bleed and seep in unexpected ways”. Chartier learned about gel electrophoresis from coverage of the O.J. Simpson trial. She began adding illustrations of this scientific laboratory process to her growing scrapbook of biology images: pictures of mold, cells, and DNA tests which became references for her organic compositions. Chartier has stated, “I'm using the creative processes in both painting and science as metaphors for one another: for curiosity and exploring and documenting the natural world with a sense of wonder.”

Chartier's Testing paintings always begin as a test. Her technical notes about which colors are which and their changes are handwritten directly on her paintings. But as critic Barbara Morris notes, “The lack of a quantifiable goal ultimately subverts the scientific air of the project. What you see is instead a purely visual investigation into the behavior of specific, individually selected materials as they are subjected to a sequence of physical and chemical manipulations.” Morris writes, “With [their] grid structure, Chartier's work relates to a broad spectrum of geometric abstraction and Minimalism, the subtle, poetic squares of Agnes Martin, the stripes of painters like Frank Stella and Kenneth Noland and the resin-based painting of Markus Linnenbrink…”

Chartier's painting process is rooted in an openness to mutability over time. The artist notes, "Time is not a dimension people usually think of for paintings. Even after you know about the testing process underpinning my work, it's tempting to view the paintings as static, frozen moments or phenomena....But they're actually slow-motion performances changing imperceptibly over time as the materials continue to interact. I design some colors to shift in hue or gradually disappear, while others remain permanent."

== Career and exhibitions ==
Chartier's work was included in the Foo Fighters 1995 debut studio album. The artist's images are on the inside of the CD booklet, the record album back cover, and the cassette J-card.

In 2002 Chartier's work was exhibited in Gene(sis): Contemporary Art Explores Human Genetics organized by the Henry Art Gallery. The show traveled to the Berkeley Art Museum, Weisman Art Museum and the Block Museum of Art. In 2006 Chartier presented her Testing paintings in a solo exhibition at the University of Michigan's Institute for the Humanities. Chartier's work was featured in the exhibition and catalog Diagnose [Art]: Contemporary Art Reflecting Medicine, presented by the Museum im Kulturspeicher, Würzburg, Germany and the Kunst-Museum Ahlen, Germany. The artist's Testing paintings were included in the 2008 exhibition Genesis – Die Kunst der Schöpfung (The Art of Creation), organized by the Zentrum Paul Klee, Bern, Switzerland. In 2015 Chartier's work was included in the exhibition Diphthong at the Fiterman Gallery at Borough of Manhattan Community College, NY. The NYU Langone Art Program exhibited Chartier's work in the 2019 exhibition Metamorphosis: Agents of Change which included works by Laurie Frick and Boeke Lab. Also in 2019, Chartier was commissioned to create a video installation for Merck Research Laboratories, South San Francisco. In 2021 Chartier's work was included in the exhibition Wunderkammer 3 at the Esbjerg KunstMuseum in Denmark. Chartier's work is held in the Esbjerg KunstMuseum's collection.

Chartier's artworks have been exhibited in solo and group exhibitions at the Frye Art Museum, Seattle; Centre Pasquart, Kunsthaus Centre d’art, Biel Bienne, Switzerland; Urban Institute for Contemporary Arts, Grand Rapids; Platform Gallery, Seattle in 2006, 2009, and 2013; Schroeder Romero Gallery, Brooklyn; Morgan Lehman Gallery, New York; Elizabeth Leach Gallery, Portland in 2005,2010, 2016, 2020 and 2025; Dolby Chadwick Gallery, San Francisco; Robischon Gallery, Denver; J. Rinehart Gallery, Seattle; Limn Gallery, San Francisco; and the William Baczek Gallery, Northampton.

As part of the Art in Embassies Program, Chartier's artworks were exhibited in the U.S. Embassies in Switzerland and Lichtenstein.

Chartier was awarded a PONCHO Special Recognition Betty Bowen Award from the Seattle Art Museum in 2001. In 1999, 2005, and 2006 Chartier was a Neddy Fellowship Award nominee.

In 2004 Marquand Books published a catalogue of Chartier's Testing artworks with an essay by curator Robin Held.

With artist Dirk Park, in 2005 Chartier founded and organized the art fair Aqua Art Miami held in the Aqua Hotel, Miami Beach, Florida. Chartier established the fair to give galleries and artists from the West coast a presence in Miami during Art Basel. Art Miami purchased the fair in 2012.

Chartier's paintings have been featured in the Showtime television series Billions.

== Personal life ==
Jaq Chartier was born November 30, 1961, in Albany, Georgia. The artist lives and works in Seattle, Washington.
