= Kuhestan Rural District (Ajab Shir County) =

Rural district in East Azerbaijan province, Iran

Kuhestan Rural District Persian: دهستان كوهستان
- Rural District
- Location within Iran
- Coordinates: 37°37′N 46°13′E
- Country: Iran
- Province: East Azerbaijan
- County: Ajab Shir
- District: Qaleh Chay
- Established: 2001
- Capital: Yengejeh

Population (2016)
  - Total: 9,468
- Time zone: UTC+3:30 (IRST)

Kuhestan Rural District (Persian: دهستان كوهستان) is in Qaleh Chay District of Ajab Shir County, East Azerbaijan province, Iran. Its capital is the village of Yengejeh.

== Demographics ==
=== Population ===
At the time of the 2006 National Census, the rural district's population was 9,810 in 2,211 households. There were 9,190 inhabitants in 2,406 households at the following census of 2011. The 2016 census measured the population of the rural district as 9,468 in 2,728 households. The most populous of its eight villages was Hargalan, with 3,371 people.

=== Other villages in the rural district ===
- Almalu
- Barazlu
- Chahar Barud
- Chahar Taq
- Quzlujeh
- Yaychi
