= Mehmandar, East Azerbaijan =

Village in East Azerbaijan province, Iran

Mehmandar Persian: مهماندار
- Village
- Location within Iran
- Coordinates: 37°30′48″N 45°57′01″E
- Country: Iran
- Province: East Azerbaijan
- County: Ajab Shir
- District: Qaleh Chay
- Rural District: Dizajrud-e Sharqi

Population (2016)
  - Total: 947
- Time zone: UTC+3:30 (IRST)

Mehmandar (Persian: مهماندار) (Note: Also romanized as Mehmāndār) is a village in Dizajrud-e Sharqi Rural District of Qaleh Chay District in Ajab Shir County, East Azerbaijan province, Iran.

== Demographics ==
=== Population ===
At the time of the 2006 National Census, the village's population was 1,090 in 268 households. The following census in 2011 counted 1,054 people in 327 households. The 2016 census measured the population of the village as 947 people in 314 households.
