= Vatin (surname) =

Vatin is a French language surname.

== People with the surname ==
- Nicolas Vatin, French epigrapher and historian
- Pierre Vatin (born 1967), French politician

== See also ==
- Valin (surname)
- Valen (surname)
- Vatin culture
- Vatin, Serbia
