= Valin (surname) =

Valin is a surname. Notable people with the surname include:

- Jonathan Valin (born 1947), American writer
- Jorge Valín (born 2000), Spanish footballer
- Martial Valin (1898–1980), French aviator
- Pierre-Vincent Valin (1827–1897), Canadian businessman and politician
  - Valin v Langlois, Canadian constitutional law decision
- Stephanie Valin (born 1987), Canadian water polo player

== See also ==
- Robert Van Valin Jr. (born 1952), American linguist
- Vatin (surname)
