= Valin River =

Valin River may refer to:

- Valin River (Saguenay River tributary), tributary of the Saguenay River, in Saguenay-Lac-Saint-Jean, Quebec, Canada
- Valin River (La Côte-de-Beaupré), tributary of the St. Lawrence River, in La Côte-de-Beaupré Regional County Municipality, Capitale-Nationale, Quebec, Canada
