= Mehmandar-e Olya =

Mehmandar-e Olya مهماندارعليا
- Village
- Location within Iran
- Coordinates: 37°02′56″N 46°07′44″E
- Country: Iran
- Province: East Azerbaijan
- County: Malekan
- Bakhsh: Central
- Rural District: Gavdul-e Markazi

Population (2006)
  - Total: 108
- Time zone: UTC+3:30 (IRST)
  - Summer (DST): UTC+4:30 (IRDT)

Mehmandar-e Olya (Persian: مهماندارعليا, also Romanized as Mehmāndār-e ‘Olyā; also known as Mahmanduz, Mehmāndār, and Mehmāndār-e Bālā) is a village in Gavdul-e Markazi Rural District, in the Central District of Malekan County, East Azerbaijan Province, Iran. At the 2006 census, its population was 108, in 27 families.
