= Khezerlu Rural District =

Rural district in East Azerbaijan province, Iran

Khezerlu Rural District Persian: شهر خضرلو
- Rural District
- Location within Iran
- Coordinates: 37°24′N 45°48′E
- Country: Iran
- Province: East Azerbaijan
- County: Ajab Shir
- District: Central
- Established: 2001
- Capital: Khezerlu

Population (2016)
  - Total: 7,491
- Time zone: UTC+3:30 (IRST)

Khezerlu Rural District (Persian: شهر خضرلو) is in the Central District of Ajab Shir County, East Azerbaijan province, Iran. Its capital is the village of Khezerlu.

== Demographics ==
=== Population ===
At the time of the 2006 National Census, the rural district's population was 8,435 in 2,033 households. There were 7,830 inhabitants in 2,347 households at the following census of 2011. The 2016 census measured the population of the rural district as 7,491 in 2,395 households. The most populous of its seven villages was Khezerlu, with 3,505 people.

=== Other villages in the rural district ===
- Nansa
- Posyan
- Razian
- Shiraz
