= Laurie Frick =

American data artist

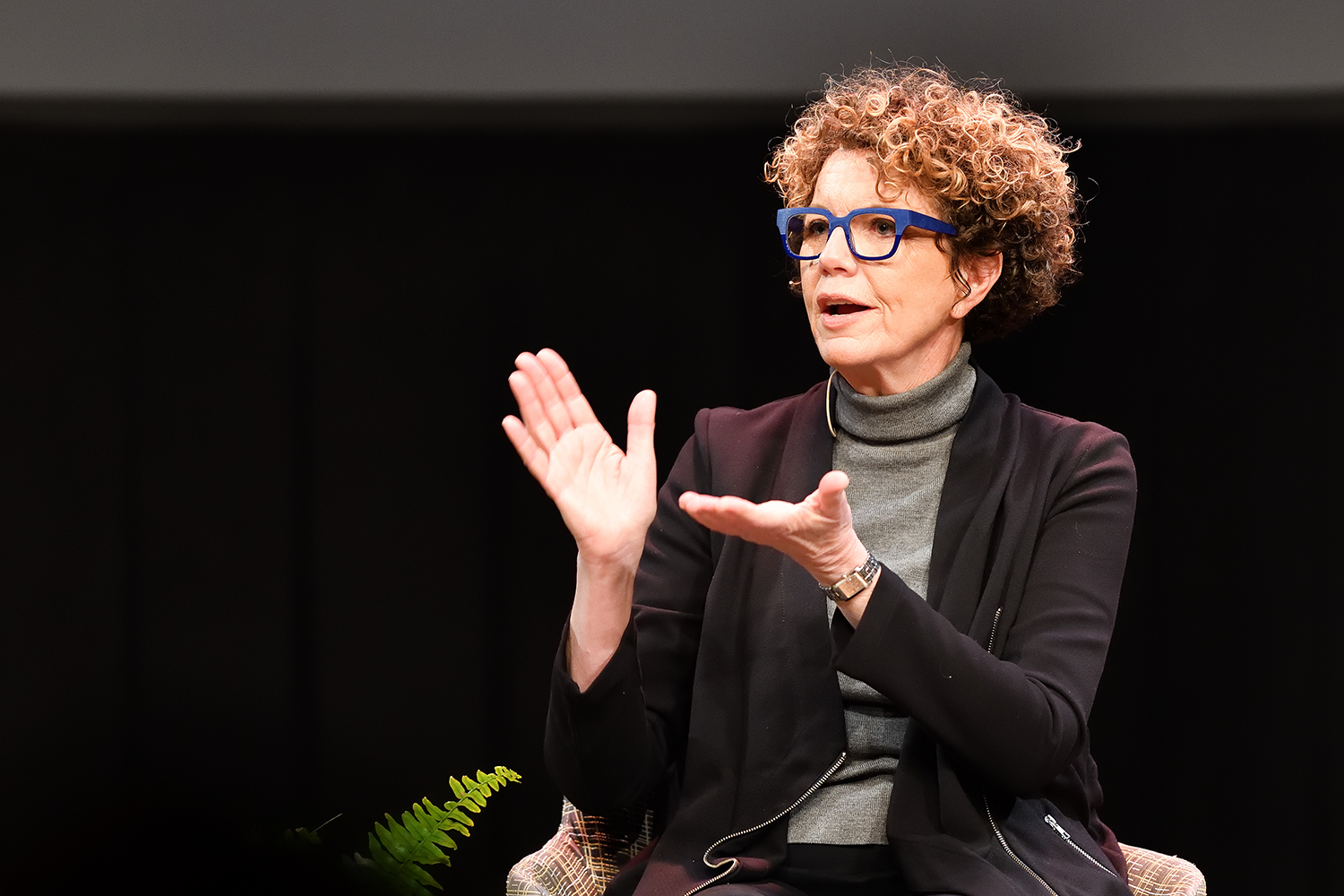
- Laurie Frick giving visiting artist talk at Transylvania University, Lexington, Kentucky in January 2019
- Born: 1955
- Education: MFA, New York Studio School, MBA University of Southern California, NYU ITP Program
- Known for: Public Art, Sculpture
- Movement: Information art
- Website: www.lauriefrick.com

Laurie Frick is an American artist known for handmade pattern-based works that explore personal data, surveillance and algorithmic identity.

== Early life and education ==
Laurie Frick began her career in technology, most notably heading up the emerging markets group in consumer products at Compaq in 1996, before switching her focus to visual arts. After spending twenty years in the technology sector, Frick switched career paths. In 2007, Frick presented her MFA thesis exhibition at the New York Studio School and received her degree.

== Career ==
According to NPR's Laura Sydell, Frick's use of sleep tracking devices inspired her to consider data as a possible medium. She used watercolor drawings to help her see patterns in the data. This began a decade-long exploration where Frick has used data about wellness, exercise, and personality and turned it into colorful artworks using watercolors, leather, and glass.

=== Style ===
Laurie Frick creates geometric styled sculptures, paintings and installations. The work frequently employs grids as an underlying organizational structure and according to Wired Magazine, achieves through paint, "a warmth not possible to achieve with technology alone." NPR's Laura Sydell describes the work as looking "a bit like a spreadsheet composed by Mondrian." Barbara Purcell similarly mentioned the artist Piet Mondrian as an antecedent in Sight Lines

=== Themes ===
Self tracking data becomes medium in the hands of Frick. The artist has said she wants to "understand how it feels to see yourself through your own data", and that her paintings are "data portraits" that give form to the invisible rhythms of our lives. In May 2020, she cited as a touchstone, Ben Lipkowitz, a member of the Quantified Self community, who life-logged all of his daily time, tracking his every movement. “He believes if you collect enough data about yourself, you can create a future version of yourself. An avatar that goes beyond you.”

Frick told the Atlantic that data art allows the viewer to understand who she is more clearly and to discover things around herself she may have forgotten or even never known. An example of these discoveries appeared in the Huffington Post, when Sarah DiGiulio interviewed Frick about the art she made using sleep tracking software. According to Frick, her husband's sleep score was twice as a high as hers, a finding she did not expect. “He didn’t remember his good sleep. He just remembered his bad sleep and when he had trouble sleeping. It was so him,” Frick told the Huffington Post. “That was what struck me. Measuring sleep is like measuring your personality. Sleep is like a signature. It’s a fingerprint. It’s very identifiable.”

=== Reception ===
Frick's art work has been featured in mass media publications including NPR’s All Things Considered, The Atlantic, and The Los Angeles Times along with online industry magazines such as Artnet and Hyperallergic. In 2011, Leah Ollman of the Los Angeles Times praised Frick's exhibition at Edward Cella Art + Architecture, calling it "an invigorating immersion in pattern, rhythm, repetition and variation." She went on to observe, "again and again in the work, the scientific impulse toward rigor and regularity is tempered by a whimsical urge toward improvisation."

In a 2015 feature for The Atlantic by Jacoba Urist Frick is featured prominently along with established figures such as Danish artist Jeppe Hein and US based artist Hans Haacke. The article identifies a group of artists who believe that self tracking offers insight into the human condition, while simultaneously asking whether the art can achieve these goals. Ultimately, the author leaves the question unanswered. Hyperallergic's Allison Meier wrote that Frick's work gives "us a better understanding of ourselves through place and time."

=== Philanthropy ===
In 2024, Frick co-founded the Frick Arts Foundation with Mark Frick and Kevin Ivester. The nonprofit organization provides annual grants to emerging artists based in Austin, Texas. Each year, the foundation awards $1,000 grants to a selected group of artists to support early-career and underrepresented artists within the Austin arts community.

== Work ==
=== Major exhibitions ===
==== Solo ====
- 2026: Ivester Contemporary, Vital Signs, TX, 2026
- 2025: Michele Mariaud Gallery, Daily Life, New York, 2025
- 2024: Ivester Contemporary, What did you do Today?, Austin, TX
- 2023: Austin Community College, Highland Art Gallery, curated by Peter Bonfitto
- 2019, Transylvania University, Data, Mine: Hasan Elahi & Laurie Frick, Lexington, KY
- 2017, Pennsylvania College of Art & Design, PCA&D, Quantified-Self: the data doesn't lie.
- 2015, Pavel Zoubok Gallery, Who are you, what day is it? New York, NY
- 2013, Oklahoma Contemporary, Walking, Eating, Sleeping, Oklahoma City, OK
- 2012, Edward Cella Art + Architecture, Death and Life of an Object, Los Angeles, CA
- 2011, Edward Cella Art + Architecture, Laurie Frick: Sleep Patterns, Los Angeles, CA

==== Group ====
- 2025:Melton Gallery, University of Central Oklahoma, Expanding Expectations, curated by Keri Smith
- 2022: miniMAC, Filter, curated by Colleen Keefe, Philadelphia, PA
- 2019-2021: Musée de la Civilization, Head in the Cloud, Quebec City, Quebec
- 2017: University of Richmond, Crooked Data, Richmond, VA 2017
- 2015: Edward Cella Gallery, Constructions, LA
- 2015: Palo Alto Arts Center, Front Yard/Backstreet, Palo Alto, CA

=== Commissions ===
- 2020, What We Eat, Interactive digital app for Google Arts & Culture, London, UK
- 2018, Tempo Refresh, 500ft Lamar underpass mural, paint, upholstered signs, LED solar lighting, Austin, TX
- 2018, Facebook, 45 ft wall and ceiling installation, handcut wood blocks and leather, Austin, TX

=== Public Talks ===
- 2024: Pecha Kucha, at Site Santa Fe, hosted by Creative Santa Fe, Santa Fe, NM
- 2019, Google, Talks at Google, Data is Irresistible, Austin, TX
- 2019, SXSW, The changing role of Women in the Arts, Austin, TX
- 2018, TEDx LadyBirdLake, I want my data! Austin, TX
- 2017, SXSW, Relationships are Ripe for Machine Learning, Austin, TX
- 2016, IBM Design Research Conference keynote, The art of data, Austin, TX
- 2016, DC Art Science Evening Rendezvous (DASER), Cultural program of the National Academy of Sciences, Washington DC,
- 2015, Advertising Age Data Conference, Data is Beautiful, New York, NY
- 2015, SXSW, From Digital Sharecropping to Data Emancipation, Austin, TX
- 2014, Creative Mornings, Human data, don't hide....get more, Austin, TX
- 2013, TEDx Austin, The art of self-surveillance, Austin, TX

=== Awards ===
- 2014-15, Samsung Research America, San Jose, CA | artist-in-residence
- 2012, Outstanding artist of the year voted by Austin Art Critics Table awards
- 2012, Lower Manhattan Cultural Council, New York | Swing Space studio award
