= Ajab Shir =

City in East Azerbaijan province, Iran

Ajab Shir Persian: عجب شير
- City
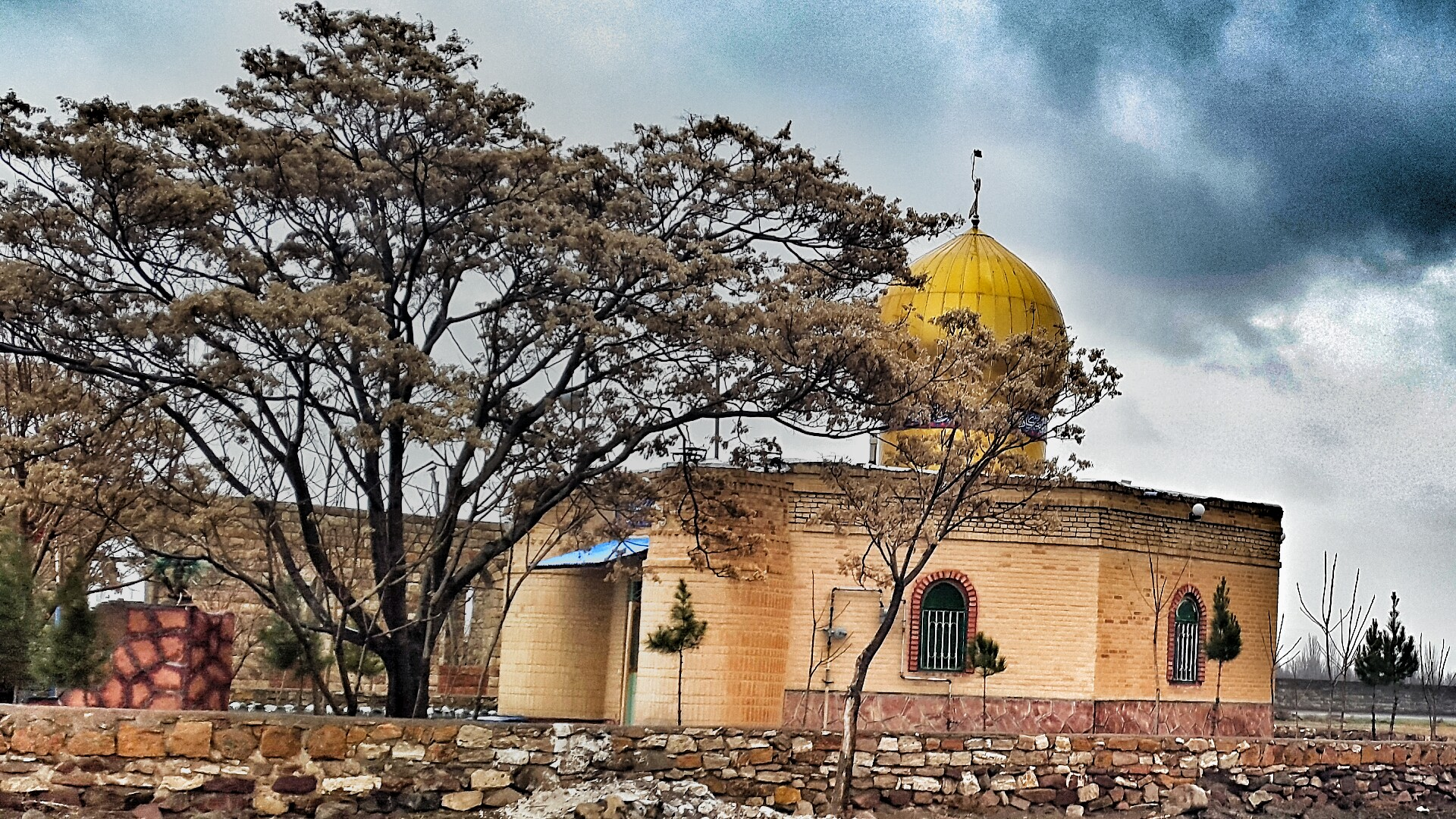
- Ajabshir, East Azerbaijan province, Iran

- Location within Iran
- Coordinates: 37°29′00″N 45°53′28″E
- Country: Iran
- Province: East Azerbaijan
- County: Ajab Shir
- District: Central

Population (2016)
  - Total: 33,606
- Time zone: UTC+3:30 (IRST)

Ajab Shir (Persian: عجب شير) (Note: Also romanized as ‘Ajab Shīr; also known as Ajabshahr) is a city in the Central District of Ajab Shir County, East Azerbaijan province, Iran, serving as capital of both the district and the county.

== Demographics ==
=== Ethnicity ===
The city's population is Azerbaijani.

=== Population ===
At the time of the 2006 National Census, the city's population was 26,235 in 6,767 households. The following census in 2011 counted 26,280 people in 7,758 households. The 2016 census measured the population of the city as 33,606 people in 10,640 households.
