= Dizajrud-e Sharqi Rural District =

Rural district in East Azerbaijan province, Iran

Dizajrud-e Sharqi Rural District Persian: دهستان ديزجرود شرقي
- Rural District
- Location within Iran
- Coordinates: 37°33′N 46°01′E
- Country: Iran
- Province: East Azerbaijan
- County: Ajab Shir
- District: Qaleh Chay
- Established: 1987
- Capital: Javan Qaleh

Population (2016)
  - Total: 6,839
- Time zone: UTC+3:30 (IRST)

Dizajrud-e Sharqi Rural District (Persian: دهستان ديزجرود شرقي) is in Qaleh Chay District of Ajab Shir County, East Azerbaijan province, Iran. It is administered from the city of Javan Qaleh.

== Demographics ==
=== Population ===
At the time of the 2006 National Census, the rural district's population was 8,914 in 1,993 households. There were 7,589 inhabitants in 2,155 households at the following census of 2011. The 2016 census measured the population of the rural district as 6,839 in 2,127 households. The most populous of its 14 villages was Chenar, with 1,277 people.

=== Other villages in the rural district ===
- Bukat
- Dizaj-e Hasan Beyg
- Huri
- Mehmandar
