= Dizajrud-e Gharbi Rural District =

Rural district in East Azerbaijan province, Iran

Dizajrud-e Gharbi Rural District Persian: دهستان ديزجرود غربي
- Rural District
- Location within Iran
- Coordinates: 37°28′N 45°42′E
- Country: Iran
- Province: East Azerbaijan
- County: Ajab Shir
- District: Central
- Established: 1987
- Capital: Khanian

Population (2016)
  - Total: 12,748
- Time zone: UTC+3:30 (IRST)

Dizajrud-e Gharbi Rural District (Persian: دهستان ديزجرود غربي) is in the Central District of Ajab Shir County, East Azerbaijan province, Iran. Its capital is the village of Khanian. The previous capital of the rural district was the village of Shishavan, now a neighborhood in the city of Ajab Shir.

== Demographics ==
=== Population ===
At the time of the 2006 National Census, the rural district's population was 12,347 in 3,035 households. There were 15,857 inhabitants in 3,443 households at the following census of 2011. The 2016 census measured the population of the rural district as 12,748 in 2,505 households. The most populous of its 18 villages was the 03 Ajabshir Recruit Training Centre, with 5,423 people.

=== Other villages in the rural district ===
- Aqcheh Owbeh
- Danalu
- Gol Tappeh
- Gowravan
- Mehrabad
- Nebrin
