= Qaleh Chay District =

District in East Azerbaijan province, Iran

Qaleh Chay District Persian: بخش قلعه چاي
- District
- Location within Iran
- Coordinates: 37°35′N 46°07′E
- Country: Iran
- Province: East Azerbaijan
- County: Ajab Shir
- Established: 2001
- Capital: Javan Qaleh

Population (2016)
  - Total: 17,007
- Time zone: UTC+3:30 (IRST)

Qaleh Chay District (Persian: بخش قلعه چاي) is in Ajab Shir County, East Azerbaijan province, Iran. Its capital is the city of Javan Qaleh.

== History ==
The village of Javan Qaleh was converted to a city in 2013.

== Demographics ==
=== Population ===
At the time of the 2006 National Census, the district's population was 18,724 in 4,204 households. The following census in 2011 counted 16,779 people in 4,561 households. The 2016 census measured the population of the district as 17,007 inhabitants living in 5,058 households.

=== Administrative divisions ===
Qaleh Chay District Population
Administrative Divisions	2006	2011	2016
Dizajrud-e Sharqi RD	8,914	7,589	6,839
Kuhestan RD	9,810	9,190	9,468
Javan Qaleh (city)			700
Total	18,724	16,779	17,007
RD = Rural District
