= Central District (Ajab Shir County) =

District in East Azerbaijan province, Iran

Central District (Ajab Shir County) Persian: بخش مرکزی شهرستان عجب شير
- District
- Location within Iran
- Coordinates: 37°27′N 45°44′E
- Country: Iran
- Province: East Azerbaijan
- County: Ajab Shir
- Established: 2001
- Capital: Ajab Shir

Population (2016)
  - Total: 53,845
- Time zone: UTC+3:30 (IRST)

The Central District of Ajab Shir County (Persian: بخش مرکزی شهرستان عجب شير) is in East Azerbaijan province, Iran. Its capital is the city of Ajab Shir.

== Demographics ==
=== Population ===
At the time of the 2006 National Census, the district's population was 47,017 in 11,835 households. The following census in 2011 counted 49,967 people in 13,548 households. The 2016 census measured the population of the district as 53,845 inhabitants living in 15,540 households.

=== Administrative divisions ===
Central District (Ajab Shir County) Population
Administrative Divisions	2006	2011	2016
Dizajrud-e Gharbi RD	12,347	15,857	12,748
Khezerlu RD	8,435	7,830	7,491
Ajab Shir (city)	26,235	26,280	33,606
Total	47,017	49,967	53,845
RD = Rural District
