= Ajab Shir County =

County in East Azerbaijan province, Iran

Ajab Shir County Persian: شهرستان عجب‌ شیر
- County
- Location of Ajab Shir County in East Azerbaijan province (center left, green)

- Location of East Azerbaijan province in Iran
- Coordinates: 37°29′N 45°54′E
- Country: Iran
- Province: East Azerbaijan
- Established: 2001
- Capital: Ajab Shir
- Districts: Central, Qaleh Chay

Population (2016)
  - Total: 70,852
- Time zone: UTC+3:30 (IRST)

Ajab Shir County (Persian: شهرستان عجب‌ شیر) is in East Azerbaijan province, Iran. Its capital is the city of Ajab Shir.

== History ==
The village of Javan Qaleh was converted to a city in 2013.

== Demographics ==
=== Population ===
At the time of the 2006 National Census, the county's population was 65,741 in 16,039 households. The following census in 2011 counted 66,746 people in 18,097 households. The 2016 census measured the population of the county as 70,852 in 20,608 households.

=== Administrative divisions ===
Ajab Shir County's population history and administrative structure over three consecutive censuses are shown in the following table.

Ajab Shir County Population
Administrative Divisions	2006	2011	2016
Central District	47,017	49,967	53,845
Dizajrud-e Gharbi RD	12,347	15,857	12,748
Khezerlu RD	8,435	7,830	7,491
Ajab Shir (city)	26,235	26,280	33,606
Qaleh Chay District	18,724	16,779	17,007
Dizajrud-e Sharqi RD	8,914	7,589	6,839
Kuhestan RD	9,810	9,190	9,468
Javan Qaleh (city)			700
Total	65,741	66,746	70,852
RD = Rural District

== See also ==
Media related to Ajab Shir County at Wikimedia Commons
