= List of cities, towns and villages in Zanjan province =

A list of cities, towns and villages in Zanjan Province of north-western Iran:

== Alphabetical ==
Cities are in bold text; all others are villages.

=== A ===
Ab Bar | Abbasabad | Abbasabad-e Olya | Abbasabad-e Sofla | Abdalar | Abhar | Abi-ye Sofla | Abu Janlu | Afsharlu | Aghol Beyk-e Olya | Aghol Beyk-e Sofla | Aghur | Aghuzlu | Ahar Meshkin | Ahmad Kandi | Ahmadabad | Aji Kahriz | Akiz Qeshlaq | Ala Chaman | Alam Kandi | Alarud | Alencheh | Algazir | Ali Mardan | Aliabad | Aliabad | Aliabad | Aliabad-e Moini | Aliabad-e Sharqi | Almaki | Almalu | Almalu | Alvand | Alvarlu | Alzin | Amidabad | Aminabad | Amir Bostaq | Amirabad | Amirabad | Amirabad | Amirabad | Amirlu | Amu Kandi | Anarestan | Andabad-e Olya | Andabad-e Sofla | Anguran | Anjalin | Anjoman-e Olya | Anjoman-e Sofla | Anzar | Aq Bolagh | Aq Bolagh-e Olya | Aq Kand | Aq Kand | Aq Kand | Aq Qui | Aqa Choqlu | Aqa Jari | Aqbolagh-e Hasanabad | Aqbolagh-e Humeh | Aqbolagh-e Sofla | Aqcheh Gonbad | Aqcheh Kand | Aqcheh Pireh | Aqcheh Qayeh | Aqjeh Qaleh | Aqzuj | Arabcheh | Arasht | Arbat | Ardajin | Ardhin | Ardin | Arhan | Arjin | Arkin | Arkuyen | Armaghankhaneh | Armaghankhaneh | Armutlu | Arqin | Arqin Bolagh | Arzeh Khvoran | Asadabad | Asadabad | Aslanlu | Astakul | Astarud | Ayalu | Aylan | Aynajik | Azad-e Olya | Azad-e Sofla | Azhdahatu | Azizabad | Azizlu | Aznab

=== B ===
Baba Marghuz | Badamestan | Bagh Darreh | Bagh Kandi | Bagh | Baghcheh | Baghlujeh Bayat | Baghlujeh | Baghlujeh-ye Aqa | Baghlujeh-ye Sardar | Bahavar | Bahman | Bahram Beyk | Bakhti | Bala Kuh | Balgeh Shir | Balvbin | Banarud | Bandargah | Baranqur | Barik Ab | Barik Ab | Barut Aghaji | Barzabil | Basarak | Bash Qeshlaq | Bayendar | Bazin | Behestan | Beyamlu | Beyanlu | Beygom Aqa | Bidgineh | Bijeqin | Binab | Birundeh | Boland Parchin | Bolugh | Bonab Industrial Complex | Borun Qeshlaq | Boyuk Qeshlaq | Bozusha | Bughda Kandi | Buin | Buji | Bulamaji | Bulamaji | Burun

=== C ===
Chahar Taq | Chal Chuq | Chalakhvor | Chalgan | Cham Rud | Chamleh | Chammeh | Chang Almas | Changur | Changuri | Chap Chap | Chap Darreh | Chapar | Chapuq | Charazeh | Chargar | Chariklu | Chashin | Chataz | Chataz | Chavarzaq | Chavarzaq | Chavor | Chay Qeshlaqi | Chayerlu | Chehrehabad | Chenaq Bolagh | Chenar | Cheragh Hesari | Cheragh Mazraeh | Cherlanqush | Chesb | Cheshmeh Bar | Chiyar | Chopoqlu | Chopoqlu | Choqluy-e Olya | Choqluy-e Sofla | Chulcheh | Chulcheh Qeshlaq | Chumalu | Chureh Nab | Churuk-e Olya | Churuk-e Sofla | Chuzak

=== D ===
Dabanlu | Dalaki | Dalayer-e Olya | Dalayer-e Sofla | Dandi | Darband | Darram | Darreh Lik | Darsajin | Dash Bolagh | Dash Bolagh | Dash Bolagh | Dash Kasan | Dash Tappeh | Dash Tappeh | Dashaltu | Dashlujeh | Dast Jerdeh | Davran | Davudgar | Daydar-e Olya | Daydar-e Sofla | Degahi | Degerman Daresi | Deh Bahar | Deh Shir | Dehjalal | Dehshir-e Olya | Dehshir-e Sofla | Dini Beyk | Dizajabad | Dizaj-e Bala | Do Asb | Do Sangan | Do Saran | Do Tappeh-ye Olya | Do Tappeh-ye Sofla | Dohneh | Dowlatabad | Dughanlu | Dulab | Dulak | Dulanab | Duljin | Durakhlu | Durmeshqan | Duzkand

=== E ===
Ebdal | Ebrahimabad | Ebrahimabad | Ebrahimabad | Ebrahimabad | Emam Kahriz | Emam Kandi | Emam Kandi | Emam | Esfajin | Esfanaj | Eskand | Eslamabad | Eslamabad | Eslamabad | Espas | Esperin | Eymir | Eyvanak

=== F ===
Falj | Fereydun | Fileh Khasseh | Funeshabad

=== G ===
Galeh Rud | Gandab | Gangak | Ganjabad | Garehlu | Garmab | Garneh | Gav Darreh | Gav Gol | Gavan Darreh | Gavkhos | Gholam Cham | Gholam Veys | Gilan Keshah | Gilvan | Gol Bodagh | Gol Bolagh | Gol Makan | Gol Tappeh | Gol Tappeh | Gol Tappeh | Golabar-e Sofla | Golablu | Golbolaghi | Golchin | Golestaneh | Golijeh | Goljik | Gollejeh | Gollijeh | Gollijeh-ye Olya | Gollijeh-ye Sofla | Golojeh | Goman Dasht | Gomesh Tappeh | Gomeshabad | Gonbad | Gondi | Govalan | Gow Ali | Gowhar | Gowjeh Qia | Gug Tappeh | Gugarchinak | Gugjeh Qeya | Gugjeh-ye Yeylaq | Guglar | Gunay | Guni | Guran | Gushtin | Guzal Darreh-ye Sofla

=== H ===
Habash | Hajj Arash | Hajj Qeshlaq | Hajj Siran | Hajji Ahmad | Hajji Bachcheh | Hajji Eynak | Hajji Kandi | Halab | Halilabad | Hammamlu-e Bala | Hammamlu-e Pain | Hamzehabad | Hamzehlu | Harunabad-e Olya | Harunabad-e Sofla | Hasan Abdali | Hasanabad | Hasanabad | Hasanabad | Hasanabad-e Jadid | Hasanabad-e Qadim | Hasanlu | Hendi Kandi | Hesamabad | Hesar Shivan | Hesar | Hesar | Hesarabad | Hesar-e Abd ol Karim | Hesar-e Olya | Hesar-e Qajar | Hesar-e Sofla | Hey | Hezarrud-e Olya | Hezarrud-e Sofla | Hidaj | Hirabad | Homayun | Hoseynabad | Hoseynabad | Hoseynabad | Hoseynabad | Hoseynabad-e Qarqalu

=== I ===
Ich | Idahlu | Ij | Ili Bolagh | Iljaq | Incheh Rahbari | Incheh-ye Khoda Bandehlu | Incheh-ye Olya | Incheh-ye Said Nezam | Incheh-ye Sofla | Isa Beyglu | Istigol

=== J ===
Jalilabad | Jarchi | Jarin | Jashn Sara | Jazimaq | Jazvan | Jezla | Jezlan Dasht | Jia | Jodaqiyeh | Jomehlu | Jowzargan | Jozvenaq | Juqin | Jureh Kandi

=== K ===
Kabrik | Kabud Cheshmeh | Kabud Gonbad | Kabutarak | Kahab | Kahalabad | Kahiya | Kahla | Kahnab | Kahriz Beyk | Kahriz Siyah Mansur | Kahriz | Kaj Kolah | Kaka | Kakaabad | Kalajabad | Kalangarz | Kalasar | Kalhin | Kali | Kalkash | Kalleh Khaneh | Kalleh Siran | Kaltan | Kaltekah | Kaluim | Kam Lar | Kamar Kuh | Kanavand | Kand-e Tatar | Kangarlu | Kangeh | Kapaz | Karasf | Karasf | Kardi | Kardlu | Kareh Chal | Karvansara | Kasik | Kasran | Kavand | Kazbar | Kelisa | Keshabad | Khakriz | Khalaj | Khalaj | Khaleqabad | Khalifeh Hesar | Khalifeh Qeshlaq | Khalifehlu | Khalifehlu | Khandab | Khandaqlu | Khanjin | Khanlar | Khanqah | Khasareh | Khatun Kandi | Khayinak | Kheyrabad | Kheyrabad | Khezerabad | Khezerchupan | Khomarak | Khorasanlu | Khorram Daraq | Khorramabad Kahriz | Khorramdarreh | Khoshkeh Rud | Khuin | Khvoin | Khvor Jahan | Khvosh | Khvoshnam | Kineh Vars | Koluch | Komajin | Kor Daraq | Kord Kandi | Kord Qeshlaq | Kordabad | Kordeh Nab | Kordenab | Koshkabad | Kuch Tappeh | Kuh Kan-e Olya | Kuh Kan-e Sofla | Kuh Zin | Kusahlar | Kusaj-e Olya | Kusaj-e Sofla | Kusejabad | Kushkan

=== L ===
Lachvan | Lahargin | Lahjebin | Lahneh | Lar | Lardeh Shur | Legahi | Leylan | Lulekabad

=== M ===
Madabad | Madabad | Mah Neshan | Mahmudabad | Mahmudabad | Majidabad | Majineh | Malek Baghi | Mamalan | Mandaq | Mantash | Mari | Mazidabad | Mazraeh | Mehdiabad | Mehdilu | Mehrabad | Mehrinabad | Mehtar | Merash | Mesgar | Meshkin | Mesrabad | Meymun Darreh | Meysam Depot | Mian Darreh | Mianaj | Mianaj | Mihman-e Shahr Soltaniyeh | Minan | Mirjan | Mirzalu | Moghanlu | Moghanlu | Mohammad Khalaj | Mohammad Shahlu | Mohammadabad | Mohammadabad-e Khvajeh Beyglu | Mohammadlu | Mohsenabad | Molla Piri | Mollalar | Morassa | Morvarid | Moshampa | Moshkabad | Mostafalu | Murestaneh

=== N ===
Nadirabad | Nahavis | Nahrevan | Najm Sheykhan | Nakatu | Nalbandan | Nariman Qeshlaq | Nasirabad | Nasirabad | Nasirabad | Nayjuk | Nazar Qoli | Nezamabad | Nik Pey | Nimavar | Noqteh Bandi | Nosratabad | Nowruzabad | Nukian | Nurabad | Nurin Industrial Complex | Nurin

=== O ===
Ogholbeyk-e Duzkand | Ommabad | Owch Bolagh | Owch Bolagh | Owch Tappeh | Owchtash | Owlang | Owli Beyk | Owrachi | Owrganjeh | Owrjak | Owrta Bolagh | Owshtanian | Owzaj

=== P ===
Paband | Pain Kuh | Palas | Paltalu | Pambeh Juq | Panbeh Zaban | Papai | Parangin | Parcham-e Qadim | Parchin | Parchineh | Pari | Pasha Chay | Paskuhan | Pesar | Peyghambarlu | Pir Marzban | Pir Zagheh | Pir-e Gavgol | Poshtak

=== Q ===
Qaderlu | Qafasabad | Qaheran | Qalat | Qalaychi | Qaleh Juq | Qaleh Juq | Qaleh Juq-e Sadat | Qaleh Juq-e Siah Mansur | Qaleh | Qaleh | Qaleh-ye Arzeh Khvoran | Qaleh-ye Hoseyniyeh | Qalicheh Bolagh | Qamchabad | Qamcheqay | Qamcheqay | Qameshlu | Qameshlu | Qandar Qalu | Qandi Bolagh | Qanli | Qanqoli-ye Olya | Qanqoli-ye Sofla | Qara Qayeh | Qaragol | Qarah Aghaj | Qarah Aghaj-e Olya | Qarah Aghaj-e Sofla | Qarah Batlaq | Qarah Bolagh | Qarah Bolagh | Qarah Bulagh | Qarah Buteh | Qarah Buteh | Qarah Charyan | Qarah Darreh | Qarah Dash | Qarah Gol | Qarah Gol | Qarah Hesarlu | Qarah Kahriz | Qarah Kul | Qarah Mohammad | Qarah Mohammad | Qarah Owghlanlu | Qarah Qeshlaq | Qarah Tappeh | Qarah Tappeh | Qarah Tappeh | Qareh Aghaj | Qareh Aqajlu | Qareh Daraq | Qareh Dowrakhlu-ye Sofla | Qareh Gowzlu | Qareh Nas | Qareh Said | Qareh Vali | Qareh Zeki | Qarehi | Qarkhotlu | Qarluq | Qarluq | Qarqan-e Olya | Qarqan-e Sofla | Qarqoli Cham | Qarrah Dagh | Qasemabad | Qashqa Tappeh | Qashqejeh | Qatar Bolaghi | Qazi Bolaghi | Qazi Kandi | Qaziabad | Qazoqluy-e Olya | Qebleh Bolaghi | Qelich Qayeh | Qerveh | Qeshlaq | Qeshlaq | Qeshlaq-e Juq-e Olya | Qeshlaq-e Juq-e Sofla | Qeshlaq-e Marshun | Qeshlaq-e Pavrud | Qeydar | Qeynarjeh | Qeytul | Qeytur | Qezel Bolagh | Qezel Tappeh-ye Ali Qoli | Qezel Tappeh-ye Bayat | Qezeljeh | Qezeljeh | Qezeljeh | Qezeljeh-ye Olya | Qezeljeh-ye Sofla | Qezlar Bolaghi | Qias Kandi | Qiasiyeh | Qinarjeh | Qojur | Qoli Kandi | Qolqati | Qoltuq | Qovaq-e Olya | Qovaq-e Sofla | Queyujuq | Quhajin | Quhijan | Qui | Qul Ali | Quli Qaseh | Quriyeh | Qushchi | Qusheh Kand | Quyjuq-e Olya | Quzan | Quzijaq-e Olya | Quzijaq-e Sofla | Quzleja | Quzlu | Quzlu

=== R ===
Rahmatabad | Rahmatabad | Rajin | Ramin | Rashtabad | Raz | Razbin | Razeh Band | Razmejin | Reyhan | Rezaabad | Robat | Ruy Special Town

=== S ===
Sabz Daraq | Sagharchi | Saha | Sahand-e Olya | Sahand-e Sofla | Sahlah | Said Kandi | Said Kandi | Said Mohammad | Saidabad | Saidabad-e Olya | Saidabad-e Sofla | Sain Qaleh | Sain | Salarabad | Salehabad | Salman Kandi | Salmanlu | Sangabin | Sansiz | Saqal Tuli | Sarab | Sarab | Sarcham-e Olya | Sarcham-e Sofla | Sardehat-e Bayat Jafar | Sardehat-e Sheykh | Sar-e Pol | Saremsaqlu | Sari Aghol | Sari Kand-e Dadash Beyk | Sari Kand-e Kabali | Sari Kand-e Olya | Sarijalu | Sarik | Sarin Darreh | Sarin Darreh | Sarv-e Jahan | Sazin | Sefid Kamar | Seqerchin | Sereshbar | Sereyn | Seyfabad | Shaban | Shahid Chomani | Shahidabad | Shahrak | Shahrak-e Halab | Shahrestanak | Shakurabad | Shalvar | Shaqaqi-ye Anzar | Shaqaqi-ye Chavarzaq | Shaqaqi-ye Jezla | Sharifabad | Sharur | Shekar Cheshmeh | Shevir | Sheykh Alu | Sheykh Jaber | Sheykh Musa | Sheykhlar | Shilandar | Shin | Shirab | Shit | Shivah | Shivarin | Shokurchi | Shur Ab | Shur Ab | Shurja | Siah Khaneh | Siahrud | Siaman | Soharin | Sohrevard | Sohrevard | Sojas | Soleyman Bolaghi | Soltaniyeh | Sonbolabad | Sonqor | Sorkhabad | Sorkheh Dizaj | Sorkheh Dizaj | Sorkheh Misheh | Sorkheh Sang | Su Kahriz | Suleh | Sulichay | Sumeeh Bar | Suntu | Suram Ali

=== T ===
Tabrizak | Tah Darreh | Taham | Taherabad | Taherlu | Tahmasababad | Tak Aghaj | Takhteh Yurd | Taleh Jerd | Talkhab | Talkhab | Taqi Kandi | Tarazuj | Tashvir | Taskin | Tat Qeshlaq | Tatardeh | Tazeh Kand | Tazeh Kand | Tazeh Kand | Tazeh Kand-e Fakhrlu | Tazeh Qeshlaq | Tazehkand-e Ziaabad | Tekmeh Dash | Teymurlu | Tolombeh-ye Khanehi Dehlu | Torkandeh | Towhidlu | Towzlu | Tudeh Bin | Tup Qarah | Turpakhlu | Tutaghaji | Tuturqan

=== U ===
Uj Musa | University of Zanjan

=== V ===
Vakil Qeshlaq | Vala Rud | Valayesh | Validar | Valis | Valiyaran | Vanab | Vananaq | Vanisar | Vanunan | Varjushan | Varmanlu | Varmazyar-e Olya | Varmazyar-e Sofla | Vazmak | Vazneh Sar | Vehran | Vik | Vistan-e Bala | Vistan-e Pain | Viyar

=== Y ===
Yaddi Bolagh | Yahyaabad | Yamchi | Yar Ahmadlu | Yar Kandi | Yasavol | Yasti Bulagh | Yasti Qaleh | Yengejeh | Yengejeh | Yengejeh | Yengi Kand | Yengi Kand-e Almasi | Yengi Kand-e Jame ol Sara | Yengi Kand-e Kandesaha | Yengi Kand-e Seyyedlar | Yengiabad | Yengijeh | Yeylaq Marshun | Yusefabad | Yusefabad | Yuz Bashi

=== Z ===
Zachkan | Zaghehlu | Zaghej | Zaker | Zamayen | Zangi Kuh | Zangin | Zangolabad | Zanjan Airport | Zanjan Industrial Area | Zanjan | Zarah Bash | Zarand | Zardeh | Zarnan | Zarni | Zarrik | Zarrin Gol | Zarrin Rud | Zarrinabad | Zarzar | Zavajer | Zavinaq | Zehtarabad
