= Khezrabad (disambiguation) =

Khezrabad is a city in Yazd Province, Iran.

Khezrabad or Khezerabad or Khazarabad (Persian: خضراباد) may also refer to:

- Khezrabad, East Azerbaijan
- Khezrabad, Kerman
- Khezrabad, Kermanshah
- Khezrabad, Mazandaran
- Khezrabad, Kashmar, Razavi Khorasan Province
- Khezrabad, West Azerbaijan
- Khezerabad, Zanjan
- Khezrabad District, in Yazd Province
