= Qarqan =

Qarqan (Persian: قرقان; Uyghur: چەرچەن; Chinese: 恰尔羌), also rendered as Qurqan, may refer to:

- Qurqan, Iran
- Qarqan, Isfahan, Iran
- Qarqan-e Olya, Iran
- Qarqan-e Sofla, Iran
- Qarqan (town), Bayingolin, Xinjiang, China
- Qarqan (county), Bayingolin, Xinjiang, China
- Qarqan (river), Bayingolin, Xinjiang, China
