= Behestan Castle =

Behestan castle
- قلعه بهستان
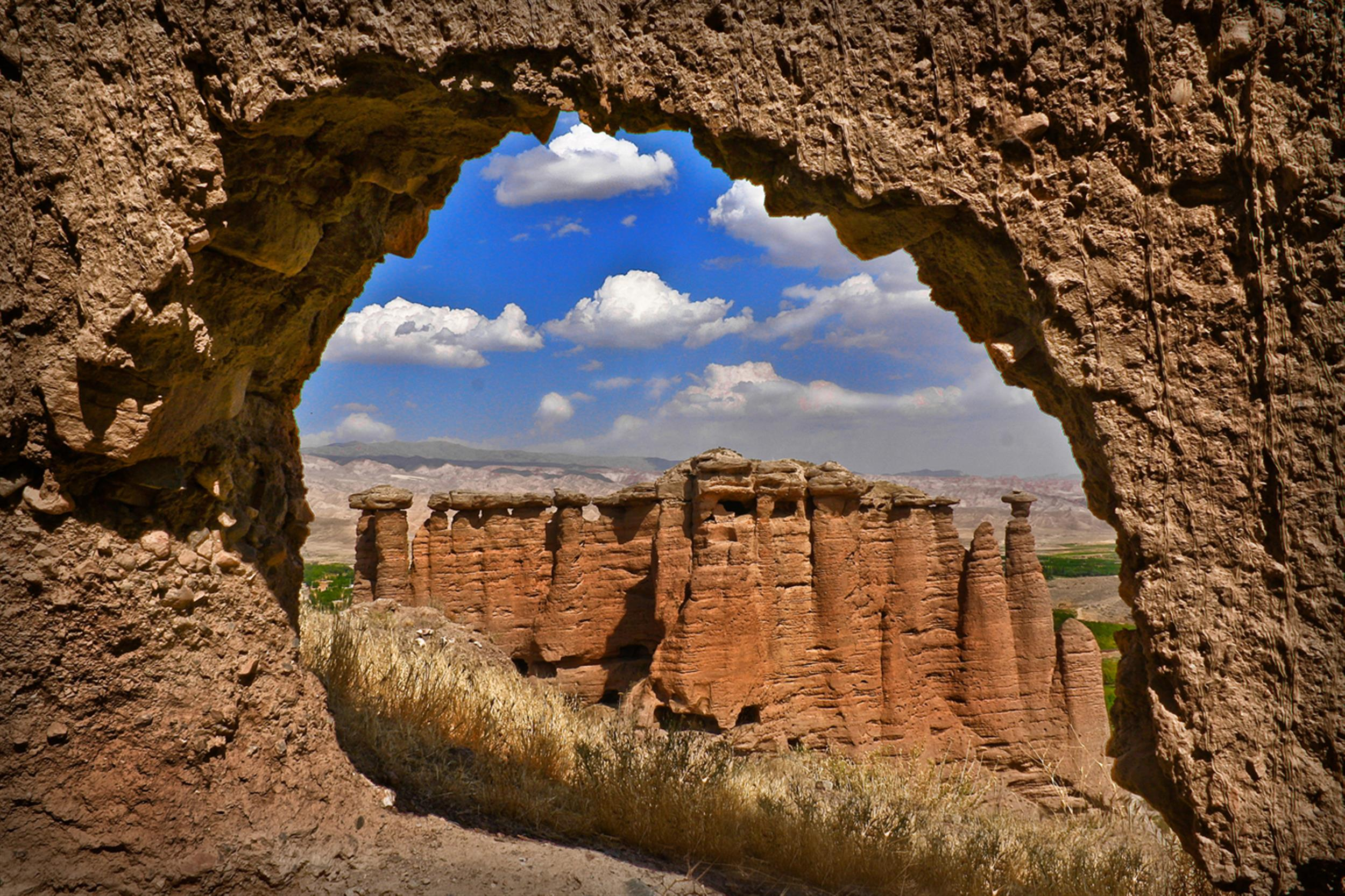
- Interactive map of the Behestan castle area

General information
- Type: Castle
- Architectural style: Iranian architecture
- Location: Mahneshan County, Iran

Behestan castle (Persian: قلعه بهستان) is a historical castle located in Mahneshan County in Zanjan Province, Iran, near Behestan village and next to Ghezel Ozan river. The first building of this fort belongs to the Sasanian Empire, but it was used in the Islamic period and the 5th to 7th centuries AH. The remains of Behestan castle have been registered in the Iran National Heritage List as number 1458. The exact date of this castle is still unclear, so that in various texts the time of its construction has been attributed to the period of the Medes, Achaemenids and Sassanids. Behestan Castle is one of the 20 historical castles of Mahneshan city of Zanjan province, the period of their use is estimated to be up to the fifth century AH. The rulers of that period, according to the special conditions of that time, started to build this fort to defend themselves and the people against the enemies. The castle has several floors. The upper floors of Behestan Castle were built for defense and the lower floors were built as slums and food storage. The builders of this castle, according to the original plan they had in mind, started digging mountains and emptying rocks and soils, thus creating rooms. Over time, as the number of rooms increased, they added communication corridors to the building in the form of corridors.
