= Sarik =

Sarik or Serik (Persian: سريك) may refer to:

- Serik, East Azerbaijan
- Sarik, Zanjan
