= Qazi Kandi =

Qazi Kandi or Qazikandi (Persian: قاضي كندي) may refer to:

- Qazi Kandi, Ardabil
- Qazikandi, Meyaneh, East Azerbaijan Province
- Qazi Kandi, Zanjan
