= Quzijaq =

Quzijaq (Persian: قوزيجاق) may refer to:

- Quzijaq-e Olya, village in Iran
- Quzijaq-e Sofla, village in Iran
