= Mazraeh, Mahneshan =

Village in Zanjan province, Iran

Mazraeh Persian: مزرعه
- Village
- Location within Iran
- Coordinates: 36°31′18″N 47°31′49″E
- Country: Iran
- Province: Zanjan
- County: Mahneshan
- District: Anguran
- Rural District: Anguran

Population (2016)
  - Total: 41
- Time zone: UTC+3:30 (IRST)

Mazraeh (Persian: مزرعه) is a village in Anguran Rural District of Anguran District in Mahneshan County, Zanjan province, Iran.

== Demographics ==
=== Population ===
At the time of the 2006 National Census, the village's population was 82 in 15 households. The following census in 2011 counted 40 people in 13 households. The 2016 census measured the population of the village as 41 people in 13 households.
