= Mianaj =

Mianaj or Miyanaj (Persian: ميانج) may refer to:

- Mianaj, Mahneshan
- Mianaj, Anguran, Mahneshan County
