= Behestan =

Behestan (Persian: بهستان) may refer to:

- Behestan, Ardabil
- Behestan, West Azerbaijan
- Behestan, Zanjan
