= Beyanlu =

Beyanlu or Bayanlu or Bianlu or Bayanloo or Biyanlu (Persian: بيانلو) may refer to:

- Bayanlu, Kurdistan
- Bianlu, West Azerbaijan
- Beyanlu, Zanjan
- Blue Cliff Record (Chinese: Biyanlu), a 12-century Chinese Chan Buddhist text
