= Kusaj =

Kusaj (Persian: كوسج) may refer to:

- Kusaj, West Azerbaijan
- Kusaj-e Olya, Zanjan Province
- Kusaj-e Sofla, Zanjan Province
