= Qeshlaq-e Juq =

Qeshlaq-e Juq (Persian: قشلاق جوق), also rendered as Qeshlaq Jug, may refer to:

- Qeshlaq-e Juq-e Olya
- Qeshlaq-e Juq-e Sofla
