= Sari Aghol =

Sari Aghol (Persian: ساري اغل) may refer to:

- Sari Aghol, East Azerbaijan
- Sari Aghol, Zanjan
