= Kheyrabad, Mahneshan =

Village in Zanjan province, Iran

Kheyrabad Persian: خيراباد
- Village
- Location within Iran
- Coordinates: 36°55′24″N 47°22′53″E
- Country: Iran
- Province: Zanjan
- County: Mahneshan
- District: Central
- Rural District: Owryad

Population (2016)
  - Total: 398
- Time zone: UTC+3:30 (IRST)

Kheyrabad (Persian: خيراباد) (Note: Also romanized as Kheyrābād) is a village in Owryad Rural District of the Central District in Mahneshan County, Zanjan province, Iran.

== Demographics ==
=== Population ===
At the time of the 2006 National Census, the village's population was 374 in 83 households. The following census in 2011 counted 358 people in 93 households. The 2016 census measured the population of the village as 398 people in 120 households.
