= Baghcheh, Zanjan =

Village in Zanjan province, Iran

Baghcheh Persian: باغچه
- Village
- Location within Iran
- Coordinates: 36°49′11″N 47°32′31″E
- Country: Iran
- Province: Zanjan
- County: Mahneshan
- District: Central
- Rural District: Mah Neshan

Population (2016)
  - Total: 184
- Time zone: UTC+3:30 (IRST)

Baghcheh (Persian: باغچه) (Note: Also romanized as Bāghcheh) is a village in Mah Neshan Rural District of the Central District in Mahneshan County, Zanjan province, Iran.

== Demographics ==
=== Population ===
At the time of the 2006 National Census, the village's population was 309 in 64 households. The following census in 2011 counted 218 people in 52 households. The 2016 census measured the population of the village as 184 people in 55 households.
