= Ganjabad, Zanjan =

Village in Zanjan province, Iran

Ganjabad Persian: گنج اباد
- Village
- Location within Iran
- Coordinates: 36°35′06″N 47°28′46″E
- Country: Iran
- Province: Zanjan
- County: Mahneshan
- District: Anguran
- Rural District: Anguran

Population (2016)
  - Total: 28
- Time zone: UTC+3:30 (IRST)

Ganjabad (Persian: گنج اباد) (Note: Also romanized as Ganjābād; also known as Gunjābād) is a village in Anguran Rural District of Anguran District in Mahneshan County, Zanjan province, Iran.

== Demographics ==
=== Population ===
At the time of the 2006 National Census, the village's population was 48 in 12 households. The following census in 2011 counted 33 people in 10 households. The 2016 census measured the population of the village as 28 people in nine households.
