= Madabad, Mahneshan =

Village in Zanjan province, Iran

Madabad Persian: ماداباد
- Village
- Location within Iran
- Coordinates: 36°42′35″N 47°48′57″E
- Country: Iran
- Province: Zanjan
- County: Mahneshan
- District: Central
- Rural District: Mah Neshan

Population (2016)
  - Total: 666
- Time zone: UTC+3:30 (IRST)

Madabad (Persian: ماداباد) (Note: Also romanized as Mādābād) is a village in Mah Neshan Rural District of the Central District in Mahneshan County, Zanjan province, Iran.

== Demographics ==
=== Population ===
At the time of the 2006 National Census, the village's population was 622 in 140 households. The following census in 2011 counted 694 people in 200 households. The 2016 census measured the population of the village as 666 people in 190 households.
