= Ayalu =

Village in Zanjan province, Iran

Ayalu Persian: ايالو
- Village
- Location within Iran
- Coordinates: 36°28′46″N 47°40′53″E
- Country: Iran
- Province: Zanjan
- County: Mahneshan
- District: Anguran
- Rural District: Anguran

Population (2016)
  - Total: 295
- Time zone: UTC+3:30 (IRST)

Ayalu (Persian: ايالو) (Note: Also romanized as Ayālū) is a village in Anguran Rural District of Anguran District in Mahneshan County, Zanjan province, Iran.

== Demographics ==
=== Population ===
At the time of the 2006 National Census, the village's population was 342 in 81 households. The following census in 2011 counted 269 people in 93 households. The 2016 census measured the population of the village as 295 people in 84 households.
