= Qovaq-e Olya, Zanjan =

Village in Zanjan province, Iran

Qovaq-e Olya Persian: قواق عليا
- Village
- Location within Iran
- Coordinates: 36°26′41″N 47°35′02″E
- Country: Iran
- Province: Zanjan
- County: Mahneshan
- District: Anguran
- Rural District: Anguran

Population (2016)
  - Total: 40
- Time zone: UTC+3:30 (IRST)

Qovaq-e Olya (Persian: قواق عليا) (Note: Also romanized as Qovāq-e ‘Olyā) is a village in Anguran Rural District of Anguran District in Mahneshan County, Zanjan province, Iran.

== Demographics ==
=== Population ===
At the time of the 2006 National Census, the village's population was 106 in 29 households. The following census in 2011 counted 70 people in 25 households. The 2016 census measured the population of the village as 40 people in 15 households.
