= Incheh-ye Said Nezam =

Village in Zanjan province, Iran

Incheh-ye Said Nezam Persian: اينچه سعيدنظام
- Village
- Location within Iran
- Coordinates: 36°35′45″N 47°52′40″E
- Country: Iran
- Province: Zanjan
- County: Mahneshan
- District: Central
- Rural District: Qezel Gechilu

Population (2016)
  - Total: 38
- Time zone: UTC+3:30 (IRST)

Incheh-ye Said Nezam (Persian: اينچه سعيدنظام) (Note: Also romanized as Īncheh-ye Sa‘īd Nez̧ām) is a village in Qezel Gechilu Rural District of the Central District in Mahneshan County, Zanjan province, Iran.

== Demographics ==
=== Population ===
At the time of the 2006 National Census, the village's population was 133 in 32 households. The following census in 2011 counted 81 people in 21 households. The 2016 census measured the population of the village as 38 people in 11 households.
