= Alam Kandi =

Village in Zanjan province, Iran

Alam Kandi Persian: علم كندي
- Village
- Location within Iran
- Coordinates: 36°46′13″N 47°16′27″E
- Country: Iran
- Province: Zanjan
- County: Mahneshan
- District: Central
- Rural District: Owryad

Population (2016)
  - Total: 584
- Time zone: UTC+3:30 (IRST)

Alam Kandi (Persian: علم كندي) (Note: Also romanized as ‘Alam Kandī) is a village in Owryad Rural District of the Central District in Mahneshan County, Zanjan province, Iran.

== Demographics ==
=== Population ===
At the time of the 2006 National Census, the village's population was 630 in 123 households. The following census in 2011 counted 618 people in 147 households. The 2016 census measured the population of the village as 584 people in 180 households.
