= Poshtak =

Village in Zanjan province, Iran

Poshtak Persian: پشتک
- Village
- Location within Iran
- Coordinates: 36°41′59″N 47°38′53″E
- Country: Iran
- Province: Zanjan
- County: Mahneshan
- District: Central
- Rural District: Mah Neshan

Population (2016)
  - Total: 316
- Time zone: UTC+3:30 (IRST)

Poshtak (Persian: پشتک) (Note: Also known as Poshtūk) is a village in Mah Neshan Rural District of the Central District in Mahneshan County, Zanjan province, Iran.

== Demographics ==
=== Population ===
At the time of the 2006 National Census, the village's population was 358 in 90 households. The following census in 2011 counted 333 people in 100 households. The 2016 census measured the population of the village as 316 people in 107 households.
