= Amirabad, Anguran =

Village in Zanjan province, Iran

Amirabad Persian: اميراباد
- Village
- Location within Iran
- Coordinates: 36°36′23″N 47°21′26″E
- Country: Iran
- Province: Zanjan
- County: Mahneshan
- District: Anguran
- Rural District: Anguran

Population (2016)
  - Total: 12
- Time zone: UTC+3:30 (IRST)

Amirabad (Persian: اميراباد) (Note: Also romanized as Amīrābād; also known as Amīnābād) is a village in Anguran Rural District of Anguran District in Mahneshan County, Zanjan province, Iran.

== Demographics ==
=== Population ===
At the time of the 2006 National Census, the village's population was 13 in four households. The village did not appear in the following census of 2011. The 2016 census measured the population of the village as 12 people in four households.
