= Qaleh Juq-e Sadat =

Village in Zanjan province, Iran

Qaleh Juq-e Sadat Persian: قلعه جوق سادات
- Village
- Location within Iran
- Coordinates: 36°37′39″N 47°27′14″E
- Country: Iran
- Province: Zanjan
- County: Mahneshan
- District: Anguran
- Rural District: Anguran

Population (2016)
  - Total: 140
- Time zone: UTC+3:30 (IRST)

Qaleh Juq-e Sadat (Persian: قلعه جوق سادات) (Note: Also romanized as Qal‘eh Jūq-e Sādāt; also known as Qal‘eh Jūq) is a village in Anguran Rural District of Anguran District in Mahneshan County, Zanjan province, Iran.

== Demographics ==
=== Population ===
At the time of the 2006 National Census, the village's population was 179 in 36 households. The following census in 2011 counted 167 people in 48 households. The 2016 census measured the population of the village as 140 people in 44 households.
