= Mazraeh-ye Leylan =

Village in Zanjan province, Iran

Mazraeh-ye Leylan Persian: مزرعه ليلان
- Village
- Location within Iran
- Coordinates: 36°39′52″N 47°44′21″E
- Country: Iran
- Province: Zanjan
- County: Mahneshan
- District: Central
- Rural District: Mah Neshan

Population (2016)
  - Total: 154
- Time zone: UTC+3:30 (IRST)

Mazraeh-ye Leylan (Persian: مزرعه ليلان) (Note: Formerly known as Leylan (ليلان), also romanized as Leylān) is a village in Mah Neshan Rural District of the Central District in Mahneshan County, Zanjan province, Iran.

== Demographics ==
=== Population ===
At the time of the 2006 National Census, the village's population was 131 in 31 households. The following census in 2011 counted 143 people in 34 households. The 2016 census measured the population of the village as 154 people in 47 households.
