= Kelisa, Zanjan =

Village in Zanjan province, Iran

Kelisa Persian: كليسا
- Village
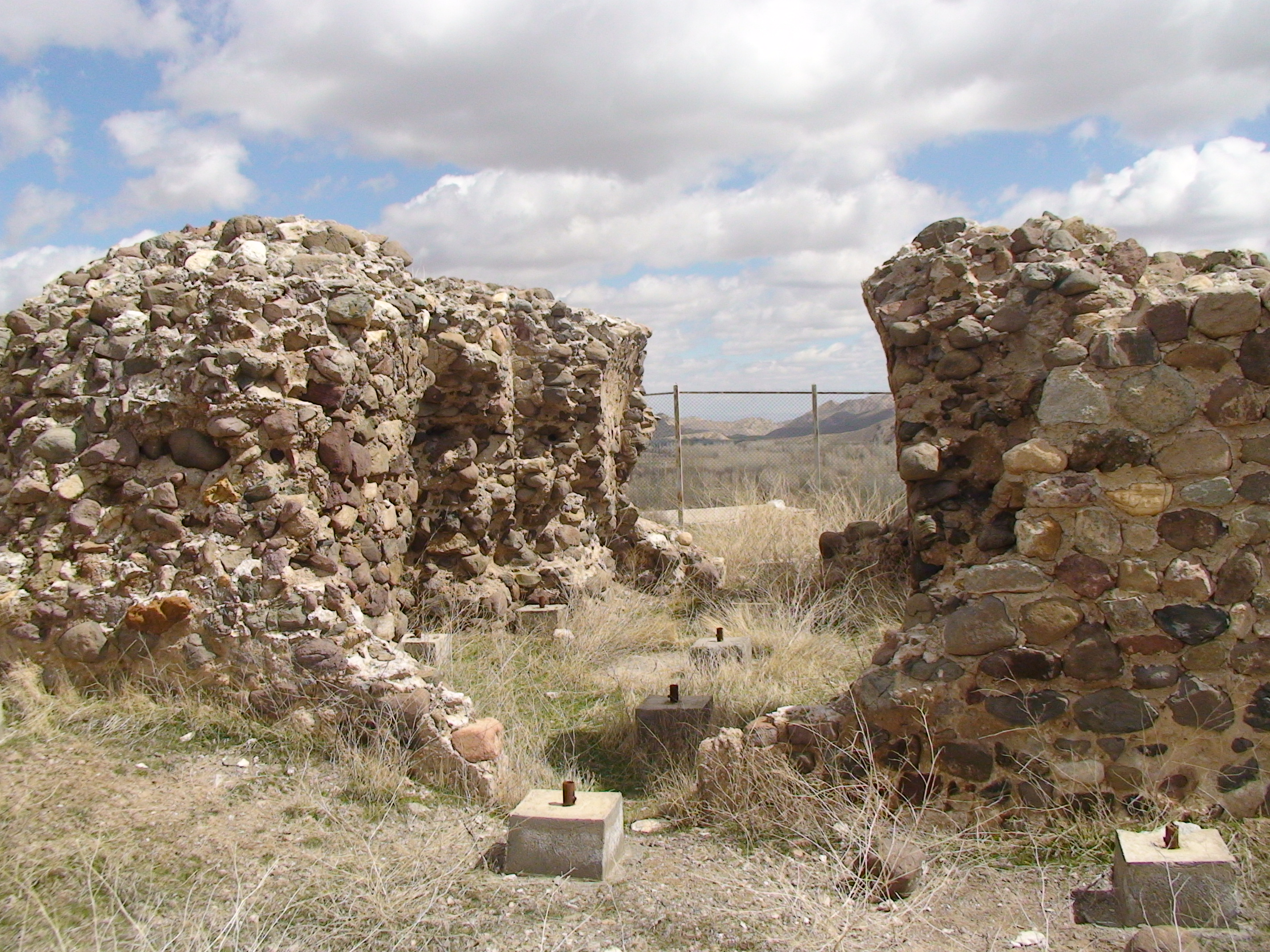

- Location within Iran
- Coordinates: 36°54′52″N 47°22′19″E
- Country: Iran
- Province: Zanjan
- County: Mahneshan
- District: Central
- Rural District: Owryad

Population (2016)
  - Total: 179
- Time zone: UTC+3:30 (IRST)

Kelisa (Persian: كليسا) (Note: Also romanized as Kelīsā) is a village in Owryad Rural District of the Central District in Mahneshan County, Zanjan province, Iran.

== Demographics ==
=== Population ===
At the time of the 2006 National Census, the village's population was 195 in 42 households. The following census in 2011 counted 183 people in 49 households. The 2016 census measured the population of the village as 179 people in 59 households.
