= Khalaj, Mahneshan =

Village in Zanjan province, Iran

Poshtak Persian: خلج
- Village
- Location within Iran
- Coordinates: 36°42′26″N 47°44′52″E
- Country: Iran
- Province: Zanjan
- County: Mahneshan
- District: Central
- Rural District: Mah Neshan

Population (2016)
  - Total: 484
- Time zone: UTC+3:30 (IRST)

Khalaj (Persian: خلج) is a village in Mah Neshan Rural District of the Central District in Mahneshan County, Zanjan province, Iran.

== Demographics ==
=== Population ===
At the time of the 2006 National Census, the village's population was 421 in 97 households. The following census in 2011 counted 459 people in 123 households. The 2016 census measured the population of the village as 484 people in 152 households.
