= Chataz, Mahneshan =

Village in Zanjan province, Iran

Chataz Persian: چتز
- Village
- Location within Iran
- Coordinates: 36°37′16″N 47°51′00″E
- Country: Iran
- Province: Zanjan
- County: Mahneshan
- District: Central
- Rural District: Qezel Gechilu

Population (2016)
  - Total: 139
- Time zone: UTC+3:30 (IRST)

Chataz (Persian: چتز) (Note: Also known as Chanteh) is a village in Qezel Gechilu Rural District of the Central District in Mahneshan County, Zanjan province, Iran.

== Demographics ==
=== Population ===
At the time of the 2006 National Census, the village's population was 162 in 41 households. The following census in 2011 counted 153 people in 44 households. The 2016 census measured the population of the village as 139 people in 47 households.
