= Sahand (disambiguation) =

Sahand is a mountain peak in East Azerbaijan Province, Iran.

Sahand (Persian:سهند) may also refer to:

- Sahand, Iran, satellite city of Tabriz, East Azerbaijan Province, Iran
- Sahand Rural District, East Azerbaijan Province, Iran
- Sahand Ski Resort, a ski resort in south east of Tabriz
- Sahand Stadium, a soccer stadium in Tabriz, Iran
- Sahand TV, a regional TV station in East Azerbaijan province of Iran
- Sahand University of Technology, a public technical university in East Azerbaijan Province, Iran
- Sahand-e Olya, a village in Zanjan Province, Iran
- Sahand-e Sofla, a village in Zanjan Province, Iran
- Iranian frigate Sahand (2012), a Moudge-class frigate
- IRIS Sahand (1969), a Mark V class frigate sunk in the Persian Gulf in 1988
