= Anguran, Zanjan =

Village in Zanjan province, Iran

Anguran Persian: انگوران
- Village
- Location within Iran
- Coordinates: 36°34′47″N 47°38′53″E
- Country: Iran
- Province: Zanjan
- County: Mahneshan
- District: Anguran
- Rural District: Anguran

Population (2016)
  - Total: 1,282
- Time zone: UTC+3:30 (IRST)

Anguran (Persian: انگوران) (Note: Also romanized as Angūrān) is a village in Anguran Rural District of Anguran District in Mahneshan County, Zanjan province, Iran.

== Demographics ==
=== Population ===
At the time of the 2006 National Census, the village's population was 1,068 in 261 households. The following census in 2011 counted 1,123 people in 343 households. The 2016 census measured the population of the village as 1,282 people in 400 households. It was the most populous village in its rural district.
