= Lahjebin =

Village in Zanjan province, Iran

Lahjebin Persian: لهجبين
- Village
- Location within Iran
- Coordinates: 36°50′48″N 47°23′25″E
- Country: Iran
- Province: Zanjan
- County: Mahneshan
- District: Central
- Rural District: Owryad

Population (2016)
  - Total: 22
- Time zone: UTC+3:30 (IRST)

Lahjebin (Persian: لهجبين) (Note: Also romanized as Lahjebīn) is a village in Owryad Rural District of the Central District in Mahneshan County, Zanjan province, Iran.

== Demographics ==
=== Population ===
At the time of the 2006 National Census, the village's population was 29 in five households. The following census in 2011 counted 22 people in four households. The 2016 census measured the population of the village as 22 people in eight households.
