= Guni, Zanjan =

Village in Zanjan province, Iran

Guni Persian: گوني
- Village
- Location within Iran
- Coordinates: 36°38′14″N 47°50′55″E
- Country: Iran
- Province: Zanjan
- County: Mahneshan
- District: Central
- Rural District: Qezel Gechilu

Population (2016)
  - Total: 259
- Time zone: UTC+3:30 (IRST)

Guni (Persian: گوني) (Note: Also romanized as Gūnī) is a village in Qezel Gechilu Rural District of the Central District in Mahneshan County, Zanjan province, Iran.

== Demographics ==
=== Population ===
At the time of the 2006 National Census, the village's population was 234 in 62 households. The following census in 2011 counted 205 people in 59 households. The 2016 census measured the population of the village as 259 people in 82 households.
