= Sar-e Pol, Zanjan =

Village in Zanjan province, Iran

Sar-e Pol Persian: سرپل
- Village
- Location within Iran
- Coordinates: 36°43′05″N 47°43′05″E
- Country: Iran
- Province: Zanjan
- County: Mahneshan
- District: Central
- Rural District: Mah Neshan

Population (2016)
  - Total: 714
- Time zone: UTC+3:30 (IRST)

Sar-e Pol (Persian: سرپل) (Note: Also known as Mir Akhur (میر آخور)) is a village in Mah Neshan Rural District of the Central District in Mahneshan County, Zanjan province, Iran.

== Demographics ==
=== Population ===
At the time of the 2006 National Census, the village's population was 569 in 131 households. The following census in 2011 counted 655 people in 180 households. The 2016 census measured the population of the village as 714 people in 212 households.
