= Khandaqlu, Zanjan =

Village in Zanjan province, Iran

Khandaqlu Persian: خندق لو
- Village
- Location within Iran
- Coordinates: 36°53′17″N 47°26′53″E
- Country: Iran
- Province: Zanjan
- County: Mahneshan
- District: Central
- Rural District: Owryad

Population (2016)
  - Total: 143
- Time zone: UTC+3:30 (IRST)

Khandaqlu (Persian: خندق لو) (Note: Also romanized as Khandaqlū) is a village in Owryad Rural District of the Central District in Mahneshan County, Zanjan province, Iran.

== Demographics ==
=== Population ===
At the time of the 2006 National Census, the village's population was 206 in 46 households. The following census in 2011 counted 161 people in 42 households. The 2016 census measured the population of the village as 143 people in 44 households.
