= Almalu, Mahneshan =

Village in Zanjan province, Iran

Almalu Persian: المالو
- Village
- Location within Iran
- Coordinates: 36°42′47″N 47°32′05″E
- Country: Iran
- Province: Zanjan
- County: Mahneshan
- District: Central
- Rural District: Mah Neshan

Population (2016)
  - Total: 223
- Time zone: UTC+3:30 (IRST)

Almalu (Persian: المالو) (Note: Also romanized as Ālmālū) is a village in Mah Neshan Rural District of the Central District in Mahneshan County, Zanjan province, Iran.

== Demographics ==
=== Population ===
At the time of the 2006 National Census, the village's population was 426 in 93 households. The following census in 2011 counted 364 people in 93 households. The 2016 census measured the population of the village as 223 people in 70 households.
