= Qovaq-e Sofla, Zanjan =

Village in Zanjan province, Iran

Qovaq-e Sofla Persian: قواق سفلي
- Village
- Location within Iran
- Coordinates: 36°26′39″N 47°35′57″E
- Country: Iran
- Province: Zanjan
- County: Mahneshan
- District: Anguran
- Rural District: Anguran

Population (2016)
  - Total: 334
- Time zone: UTC+3:30 (IRST)

Qovaq-e Sofla (Persian: قواق سفلي) (Note: Also romanized as Qovāq-e Soflá; also known as Qavāq and Qovāq) is a village in Anguran Rural District of Anguran District in Mahneshan County, Zanjan province, Iran.

== Demographics ==
=== Population ===
At the time of the 2006 National Census, the village's population was 537 in 119 households. The following census in 2011 counted 436 people in 135 households. The 2016 census measured the population of the village as 334 people in 113 households.
