= Amirabad, Mahneshan =

Village in Zanjan province, Iran

Amirabad Persian: اميراباد
- Village
- Location within Iran
- Coordinates: 36°32′50″N 47°50′04″E
- Country: Iran
- Province: Zanjan
- County: Mahneshan
- District: Central
- Rural District: Qezel Gechilu

Population (2016)
  - Total: 232
- Time zone: UTC+3:30 (IRST)

Amirabad (Persian: اميراباد) (Note: Also romanized as Amīrābād) is a village in Qezel Gechilu Rural District of the Central District in Mahneshan County, Zanjan province, Iran.

== Demographics ==
=== Population ===
At the time of the 2006 National Census, the village's population was 279 in 63 households. The following census in 2011 counted 275 people in 76 households. The 2016 census measured the population of the village as 232 people in 75 households.
