= Golablu =

Village in Zanjan province, Iran

Golablu Persian: گلابلو
- Village
- Location within Iran
- Coordinates: 36°33′50″N 47°25′57″E
- Country: Iran
- Province: Zanjan
- County: Mahneshan
- District: Anguran
- Rural District: Anguran

Population (2016)
  - Total: 52
- Time zone: UTC+3:30 (IRST)

Golablu (Persian: گلابلو) (Note: Also romanized as Golāblū) is a village in Anguran Rural District of Anguran District in Mahneshan County, Zanjan province, Iran.

== Demographics ==
=== Population ===
At the time of the 2006 National Census, the village's population was 85 in 20 households. The following census in 2011 counted 58 people in 20 households. The 2016 census measured the population of the village as 52 people in 18 households.
