= Khayinak =

Village in Zanjan province, Iran

Khayinak Persian: خائينك
- Village
- Location within Iran
- Coordinates: 36°34′11″N 47°39′13″E
- Country: Iran
- Province: Zanjan
- County: Mahneshan
- District: Anguran
- Rural District: Anguran

Population (2016)
  - Total: 214
- Time zone: UTC+3:30 (IRST)

Khayinak (Persian: خائينك) (Note: Also romanized as Khāyīnak; also known as Khānīk) is a village in Anguran Rural District of Anguran District in Mahneshan County, Zanjan province, Iran.

== Demographics ==
=== Population ===
At the time of the 2006 National Census, the village's population was 218 in 45 households. The following census in 2011 counted 211 people in 63 households. The 2016 census measured the population of the village as 214 people in 74 households.
