= Kaka, Zanjan =

Village in Zanjan province, Iran

Kaka Persian: كاكا
- Village
- Location within Iran
- Coordinates: 36°34′46″N 47°23′30″E
- Country: Iran
- Province: Zanjan
- County: Mahneshan
- District: Anguran
- Rural District: Anguran

Population (2016)
  - Total: 124
- Time zone: UTC+3:30 (IRST)

Kaka (Persian: كاكا) (Note: Also romanized as Kākā; also known as Kākeh; formerly known as Keshkhan (کش‌خان)) is a village in Anguran Rural District of Anguran District in Mahneshan County, Zanjan province, Iran.

== Demographics ==
=== Population ===
At the time of the 2006 National Census, the village's population was 183 in 37 households. The following census in 2011 counted 144 people in 50 households. The 2016 census measured the population of the village as 124 people in 41 households.
