= Khvor Jahan =

Village in Zanjan province, Iran

Khvor Jahan Persian: خورجهان
- Village
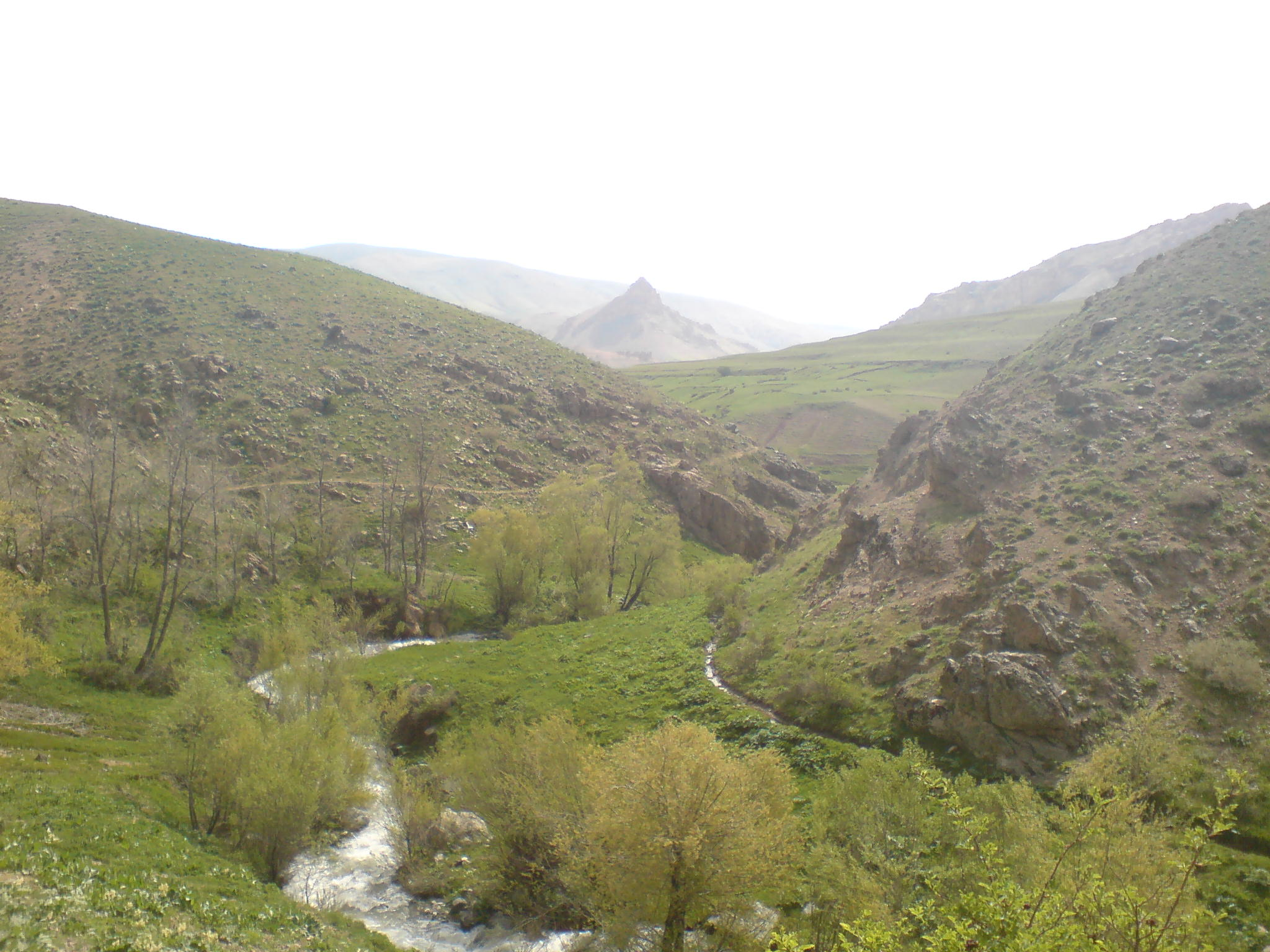
- Khvor Jahan

- Location within Iran
- Coordinates: 36°41′25″N 47°24′06″E
- Country: Iran
- Province: Zanjan
- County: Mahneshan
- District: Anguran
- Rural District: Anguran

Population (2016)
  - Total: 194
- Time zone: UTC+3:30 (IRST)

Khvor Jahan (Persian: خورجهان) (Note: Also romanized as Khūrjahān and Khvor Jahān) is a village in Anguran Rural District of Anguran District in Mahneshan County, Zanjan province, Iran.

== Demographics ==
=== Population ===
At the time of the 2006 National Census, the village's population was 323 in 67 households. The following census in 2011 counted 290 people in 83 households. The 2016 census measured the population of the village as 194 people in 62 households.
