= Yengejeh, Anguran =

Village in Zanjan province, Iran

Yengejeh Persian: dنگجه
- Village
- Location within Iran
- Coordinates: 36°33′05″N 47°28′39″E
- Country: Iran
- Province: Zanjan
- County: Mahneshan
- District: Anguran
- Rural District: Anguran

Population (2016)
  - Total: 208
- Time zone: UTC+3:30 (IRST)

Yengejeh (Persian: ینگجه) is a village in Anguran Rural District of Anguran District in Mahneshan County, Zanjan province, Iran.

== Demographics ==
=== Population ===
At the time of the 2006 National Census, the village's population was 239 in 62 households. The following census in 2011 counted 253 people in 80 households. The 2016 census measured the population of the village as 208 people in 65 households.
