= Qaragol, Zanjan =

Village in Zanjan province, Iran

Qaragol Persian: قراگل
- Village
- Location within Iran
- Coordinates: 36°36′23″N 47°42′15″E
- Country: Iran
- Province: Zanjan
- County: Mahneshan
- District: Anguran
- Rural District: Anguran

Population (2016)
  - Total: 31
- Time zone: UTC+3:30 (IRST)

Qaragol (Persian: قراگل) (Note: Also romanized as Qarāgol; also known as Qarah Āghol, Qarehqol, and Tumar Khan (طومار خان)) is a village in Anguran Rural District of Anguran District in Mahneshan County, Zanjan province, Iran.

== Demographics ==
=== Population ===
At the time of the 2006 National Census, the village's population was 95 in 19 households. The following census in 2011 counted 56 people in 17 households. The 2016 census measured the population of the village as 31 people in nine households.
