= Aq Kand, Mahneshan =

Village in Zanjan province, Iran

Aq Kand Persian: اق كند
- Village
- Location within Iran
- Coordinates: 36°42′25″N 47°34′30″E
- Country: Iran
- Province: Zanjan
- County: Mahneshan
- District: Central
- Rural District: Mah Neshan

Population (2016)
  - Total: 444
- Time zone: UTC+3:30 (IRST)

Aq Kand (Persian: اق كند) (Note: Also romanized as Āq Kand and Āqkand) is a village in Mah Neshan Rural District of the Central District in Mahneshan County, Zanjan province, Iran.

== Demographics ==
=== Population ===
At the time of the 2006 National Census, the village's population was 580 in 137 households. The following census in 2011 counted 495 people in 136 households. The 2016 census measured the population of the village as 444 people in 137 households.
