= Arzeh Khvoran =

Village in Zanjan province, Iran

Arzeh Khvoran Persian: ارزه خوران
- Village
- Location within Iran
- Coordinates: 36°55′34″N 47°23′49″E
- Country: Iran
- Province: Zanjan
- County: Mahneshan
- District: Central
- Rural District: Owryad

Population (2016)
  - Total: 216
- Time zone: UTC+3:30 (IRST)

Arzeh Khvoran (Persian: ارزه خوران) (Note: Also romanized as Arzeh Khowrān and Arzeh Khvorān; also known as Arzeh Khvorān-e Bozorg) is a village in Owryad Rural District of the Central District in Mahneshan County, Zanjan province, Iran.

== Demographics ==
=== Population ===
At the time of the 2006 National Census, the village's population was 243 in 46 households. The following census in 2011 counted 240 people in 59 households. The 2016 census measured the population of the village as 216 people in 62 households.
