= IRIS Sahand =

Two ships of the Iranian Navy have been named Sahand:

- IRIS Sahand (1969) (ex-IIS Faramarz), an Alvand-class frigate launched in 1969 and sunk in 1988
- IRIS Sahand (2012), a Moudge-class frigate launched in 2012 and sunk in 2026

== See also ==
- Sahand (disambiguation)
