= Owrjak =

Village in Zanjan province, Iran

Owrjak Persian: اورجك
- Village
- Location within Iran
- Coordinates: 36°56′16″N 47°26′37″E
- Country: Iran
- Province: Zanjan
- County: Mahneshan
- District: Central
- Rural District: Owryad

Population (2016)
  - Total: 141
- Time zone: UTC+3:30 (IRST)

Owrjak (Persian: اورجك) (Note: Also romanized as Ūrjak) is a village in Owryad Rural District of the Central District in Mahneshan County, Zanjan province, Iran.

== Demographics ==
=== Population ===
At the time of the 2006 National Census, the village's population was 175 in 29 households. The following census in 2011 counted 146 people in 31 households. The 2016 census measured the population of the village as 141 people in 39 households.
