= Sagharchi =

Village in Zanjan province, Iran

Sagharchi Persian: ساغرچي
- Village
- Location within Iran
- Coordinates: 36°35′53″N 47°27′41″E
- Country: Iran
- Province: Zanjan
- County: Mahneshan
- District: Anguran
- Rural District: Anguran

Population (2016)
  - Total: 90
- Time zone: UTC+3:30 (IRST)

Sagharchi (Persian: ساغرچي) (Note: Also romanized as Sāgharchī; also known as Sāqarchī and Alakhlu (‌الاخلو)) is a village in Anguran Rural District of Anguran District in Mahneshan County, Zanjan province, Iran.

== Demographics ==
=== Population ===
At the time of the 2006 National Census, the village's population was 130 in 33 households. The following census in 2011 counted 101 people in 35 households. The 2016 census measured the population of the village as 90 people in 26 households.
