= Vehran =

Village in Zanjan province, Iran

Vehran Persian: وهران
- Village
- Location within Iran
- Coordinates: 36°41′55″N 47°49′46″E
- Country: Iran
- Province: Zanjan
- County: Mahneshan
- District: Central
- Rural District: Mah Neshan

Population (2016)
  - Total: 535
- Time zone: UTC+3:30 (IRST)

Vehran (Persian: وهران) (Note: Also romanized as Vehrān) is a village in Mah Neshan Rural District of the Central District in Mahneshan County, Zanjan province, Iran.

== Demographics ==
=== Population ===
At the time of the 2006 National Census, the village's population was 630 in 152 households. The following census in 2011 counted 609 people in 169 households. The 2016 census measured the population of the village as 535 people in 154 households.
