= Yasti Qaleh =

Village in Zanjan province, Iran

Yasti Qaleh Persian: ياستي قلعه
- Village
- Location within Iran
- Coordinates: 36°40′30″N 47°25′23″E
- Country: Iran
- Province: Zanjan
- County: Mahneshan
- District: Anguran
- Rural District: Anguran

Population (2016)
  - Total: 96
- Time zone: UTC+3:30 (IRST)

Yasti Qaleh (Persian: ياستي قلعه) (Note: Also romanized as Yāstī Qal‘eh) is a village in Anguran Rural District of Anguran District in Mahneshan County, Zanjan province, Iran.

== Demographics ==
=== Population ===
At the time of the 2006 National Census, the village's population was 170 in 35 households. The following census in 2011 counted 102 people in 28 households. The 2016 census measured the population of the village as 96 people in 31 households.
