= Said Kandi =

Said Kandi (Persian: سعيدكندي) may refer to:

- Said Kandi, Zanjan
- Said Kandi, Mahneshan, Zanjan Province
