= Moghanlu, Qezel Gechilu =

Village in Zanjan province, Iran

Moghanlu Persian: مغانلو
- Village
- Location within Iran
- Coordinates: 36°38′17″N 47°54′40″E
- Country: Iran
- Province: Zanjan
- County: Mahneshan
- District: Central
- Rural District: Qezel Gechilu

Population (2016)
  - Total: 262
- Time zone: UTC+3:30 (IRST)

Moghanlu (Persian: مغانلو) (Note: Also romanized as Moghānlū) is a village in Qezel Gechilu Rural District of the Central District in Mahneshan County, Zanjan province, Iran.

== Demographics ==
=== Population ===
At the time of the 2006 National Census, the village's population was 522 in 124 households. The following census in 2011 counted 432 people in 117 households. The 2016 census measured the population of the village as 262 people in 86 households.
