= Quzlu, Mahneshan =

Village in Zanjan province, Iran

Quzlu Persian: قوزلو
- Village
- Location within Iran
- Coordinates: 36°42′10″N 47°25′12″E
- Country: Iran
- Province: Zanjan
- County: Mahneshan
- District: Anguran
- Rural District: Anguran

Population (2016)
  - Total: 173
- Time zone: UTC+3:30 (IRST)

Quzlu (Persian: قوزلو) (Note: Also romanized as Qūzlū) is a village in Anguran Rural District of Anguran District in Mahneshan County, Zanjan province, Iran.

== Demographics ==
=== Population ===
At the time of the 2006 National Census, the village's population was 270 in 58 households. The following census in 2011 counted 207 people in 64 households. The 2016 census measured the population of the village as 173 people in 53 households.
