= Karvansara, Zanjan =

Village in Zanjan province, Iran

Karvansara Persian: كاروانسرا
- Village
- Location within Iran
- Coordinates: 36°23′28″N 47°39′59″E
- Country: Iran
- Province: Zanjan
- County: Mahneshan
- District: Anguran
- Rural District: Anguran

Population (2016)
  - Total: 67
- Time zone: UTC+3:30 (IRST)

Karvansara (Persian: كاروانسرا) (Note: Also romanized as Kārvānsarā) is a village in Anguran Rural District of Anguran District in Mahneshan County, Zanjan province, Iran.

== Demographics ==
=== Population ===
At the time of the 2006 National Census, the village's population was 140 in 23 households. The following census in 2011 counted 104 people in 29 households. The 2016 census measured the population of the village as 67 people in 20 households.
