= Ili Bolagh =

Village in Zanjan province, Iran

Ili Bolagh Persian: ايلي بلاغ
- Village
- Location within Iran
- Coordinates: 36°39′56″N 47°44′52″E
- Country: Iran
- Province: Zanjan
- County: Mahneshan
- District: Central
- Rural District: Mah Neshan

Population (2016)
  - Total: 1,155
- Time zone: UTC+3:30 (IRST)

Ili Bolagh (Persian: ايلي بلاغ) (Note: Also romanized as Īlī Bolāgh; also known as Īglī Bolāgh) is a village in Mah Neshan Rural District of the Central District in Mahneshan County, Zanjan province, Iran.

== Demographics ==
=== Population ===
At the time of the 2006 National Census, the village's population was 870 in 196 households. The following census in 2011 counted 1,038 people in 256 households. The 2016 census measured the population of the village as 1,155 people in 348 households. It was the most populous village in its rural district.
