= Qarah Dash, Zanjan =

Village in Zanjan province, Iran

Qarah Dash Persian: قره داش
- Village
- Location within Iran
- Coordinates: 36°47′41″N 47°25′02″E
- Country: Iran
- Province: Zanjan
- County: Mahneshan
- District: Central
- Rural District: Owryad

Population (2016)
  - Total: 257
- Time zone: UTC+3:30 (IRST)

Qarah Dash (Persian: قره داش) (Note: Also romanized as Qarah Dāsh and Qareh Dāsh) is a village in Owryad Rural District of the Central District in Mahneshan County, Zanjan province, Iran.

== Demographics ==
=== Population ===
At the time of the 2006 National Census, the village's population was 510 in 105 households. The following census in 2011 counted 287 people in 82 households. The 2016 census measured the population of the village as 257 people in 82 households.
