= Qareh Zeki, Zanjan =

Village in Zanjan province, Iran

Qareh Zeki Persian: قره زكي
- Village
- Location within Iran
- Coordinates: 36°39′33″N 47°28′50″E
- Country: Iran
- Province: Zanjan
- County: Mahneshan
- District: Anguran
- Rural District: Anguran

Population (2016)
  - Total: 81
- Time zone: UTC+3:30 (IRST)

Qareh Zeki (Persian: قره زكي) (Note: Also romanized as Qareh Zekī; also known as Qarah Zāker) is a village in Anguran Rural District of Anguran District in Mahneshan County, Zanjan province, Iran.

== Demographics ==
=== Population ===
At the time of the 2006 National Census, the village's population was 131 in 30 households. The following census in 2011 counted 109 people in 31 households. The 2016 census measured the population of the village as 81 people in 27 households.
