= Hasanabad-e Qadim =

Village in Zanjan province, Iran

Hasanabad-e Qadim Persian: حسن ابادقديم
- Village
- Location within Iran
- Coordinates: 36°50′05″N 47°24′32″E
- Country: Iran
- Province: Zanjan
- County: Mahneshan
- District: Central
- Rural District: Owryad

Population (2016)
  - Total: 57
- Time zone: UTC+3:30 (IRST)

Hasanabad-e Qadim (Persian: حسن ابادقديم) (Note: Also romanized as Ḩasanābād-e Qadīm; also known as Ḩasanābād) is a village in Owryad Rural District of the Central District in Mahneshan County, Zanjan province, Iran.

== Demographics ==
=== Population ===
At the time of the 2006 National Census, the village's population was 67 in 14 households. The following census in 2011 counted 55 people in 14 households. The 2016 census measured the population of the village as 57 people in 20 households.
