= Hasanabad-e Jadid =

Village in Zanjan province, Iran

Hasanabad-e Jadid Persian: حسن ابادجديد
- Village
- Location within Iran
- Coordinates: 36°49′57″N 47°24′34″E
- Country: Iran
- Province: Zanjan
- County: Mahneshan
- District: Central
- Rural District: Owryad

Population (2016)
  - Total: Below reporting threshold
- Time zone: UTC+3:30 (IRST)

Hasanabad-e Jadid (Persian: حسن ابادجديد) (Note: Also romanized as Ḩasanābād-e Jadīd; also known as Ḩasanābād) is a village in Owryad Rural District of the Central District in Mahneshan County, Zanjan province, Iran.

== Demographics ==
=== Population ===
At the time of the 2006 National Census, the village's population was 30 in five households. The village did not appear in the following census of 2011. The 2016 census measured the population of the village as below the reporting threshold.
