= Qarah Batlaq =

Village in Zanjan province, Iran

Qarah Batlaq Persian: قره باطلاق
- Village
- Location within Iran
- Coordinates: 36°37′54″N 47°45′56″E
- Country: Iran
- Province: Zanjan
- County: Mahneshan
- District: Central
- Rural District: Mah Neshan

Population (2016)
  - Total: 651
- Time zone: UTC+3:30 (IRST)

Qarah Batlaq (Persian: قره باطلاق) (Note: Also romanized as Qarah Bāţlāq and Qareh Bāţlāq) is a village in Mah Neshan Rural District of the Central District in Mahneshan County, Zanjan province, Iran.

== Demographics ==
=== Population ===
At the time of the 2006 National Census, the village's population was 629 in 138 households. The following census in 2011 counted 619 people in 163 households. The 2016 census measured the population of the village as 651 people in 198 households.
