= Raz, Zanjan =

Village in Zanjan province, Iran

Raz Persian: رز
- Village
- Location within Iran
- Coordinates: 36°51′25″N 47°37′01″E
- Country: Iran
- Province: Zanjan
- County: Mahneshan
- District: Central
- Rural District: Mah Neshan

Population (2016)
  - Total: 89
- Time zone: UTC+3:30 (IRST)

Raz (Persian: رز) (Note: Also romanized as Raẕ) is a village in Mah Neshan Rural District of the Central District in Mahneshan County, Zanjan province, Iran.

== Demographics ==
=== Population ===
At the time of the 2006 National Census, the village's population was 87 in 19 households. The following census in 2011 counted 74 people in 19 households. The 2016 census measured the population of the village as 89 people in 26 households.
