= Incheh-ye Sofla, Zanjan =

Village in Zanjan province, Iran

Incheh-ye Sofla Persian: اينچه سفلي
- Village
- Location within Iran
- Coordinates: 36°37′46″N 47°35′43″E
- Country: Iran
- Province: Zanjan
- County: Mahneshan
- District: Anguran
- Rural District: Anguran

Population (2016)
  - Total: 55
- Time zone: UTC+3:30 (IRST)

Incheh-ye Sofla (Persian: اينچه سفلي) (Note: Also romanized as Īncheh-ye Soflá) is a village in Anguran Rural District of Anguran District in Mahneshan County, Zanjan province, Iran.

== Demographics ==
=== Population ===
At the time of the 2006 National Census, the village's population was 85 in 23 households. The following census in 2011 counted 65 people in 22 households. The 2016 census measured the population of the village as 55 people in 19 households.
