= Lardeh Shur =

Village in Zanjan province, Iran

Lardeh Shur Persian: لرده شور
- Village
- Location within Iran
- Coordinates: 36°53′18″N 47°23′51″E
- Country: Iran
- Province: Zanjan
- County: Mahneshan
- District: Central
- Rural District: Owryad

Population (2016)
  - Total: 182
- Time zone: UTC+3:30 (IRST)

Lardeh Shur (Persian: لرده شور) (Note: Also romanized as Lardeh Shūr and Lardehshūr) is a village in Owryad Rural District of the Central District in Mahneshan County, Zanjan province, Iran.

== Demographics ==
=== Population ===
At the time of the 2006 National Census, the village's population was 184 in 44 households. The following census in 2011 counted 197 people in 55 households. The 2016 census measured the population of the village as 182 people in 61 households.
