= Shahrak-e Halab =

Village in Zanjan province, Iran

Shahrak-e Halab Persian: شهرك حلب
- Village
- Location within Iran
- Coordinates: 36°29′18″N 47°28′26″E
- Country: Iran
- Province: Zanjan
- County: Mahneshan
- District: Anguran
- Rural District: Anguran

Population (2016)
  - Total: 532
- Time zone: UTC+3:30 (IRST)

Shahrak-e Halab (Persian: شهرك حلب) (Note: Also romanized as Shahrak-e Ḩalab; also known as Ḩalab-e ‘Olyā) is a village in Anguran Rural District of Anguran District in Mahneshan County, Zanjan province, Iran.

== Demographics ==
=== Population ===
At the time of the 2006 National Census, the village's population was 551 in 112 households. The following census in 2011 counted 477 people in 151 households. The 2016 census measured the population of the village as 532 people in 171 households.
