= Merash =

Village in Zanjan province, Iran

Merash Persian: مراش
- Village
- Location within Iran
- Coordinates: 36°33′00″N 47°33′58″E
- Country: Iran
- Province: Zanjan
- County: Mahneshan
- District: Anguran
- Rural District: Anguran

Population (2016)
  - Total: 182
- Time zone: UTC+3:30 (IRST)

Merash (Persian: مراش) (Note: Also romanized as Marāsh and Merāsh) is a village in Anguran Rural District of Anguran District in Mahneshan County, Zanjan province, Iran.

== Demographics ==
=== Population ===
At the time of the 2006 National Census, the village's population was 234 in 57 households. The following census in 2011 counted 237 people in 77 households. The 2016 census measured the population of the village as 182 people in 59 households.
