= Tat Qeshlaq =

Village in Zanjan province, Iran

Tat Qeshlaq Persian: تات قشلاق
- Village
- Location within Iran
- Coordinates: 36°49′15″N 47°15′37″E
- Country: Iran
- Province: Zanjan
- County: Mahneshan
- District: Central
- Rural District: Owryad

Population (2016)
  - Total: 166
- Time zone: UTC+3:30 (IRST)

Tat Qeshlaq (Persian: تات قشلاق) (Note: Also romanized as Tāt Qeshlāq; also known as Ţātqeshlāqī) is a village in Owryad Rural District of the Central District in Mahneshan County, Zanjan province, Iran.

== Demographics ==
=== Population ===
At the time of the 2006 National Census, the village's population was 261 in 54 households. The following census in 2011 counted 232 people in 48 households. The 2016 census measured the population of the village as 166 people in 61 households.
