= Kapaz =

Village in Zanjan province, Iran

Kapaz Persian: كپز
- Village
- Location within Iran
- Coordinates: 36°35′11″N 47°33′48″E
- Country: Iran
- Province: Zanjan
- County: Mahneshan
- District: Anguran
- Rural District: Anguran

Population (2016)
  - Total: 244
- Time zone: UTC+3:30 (IRST)

Kapaz (Persian: كپز) is a village in Anguran Rural District of Anguran District in Mahneshan County, Zanjan province, Iran.

== Demographics ==
=== Population ===
At the time of the 2006 National Census, the village's population was 264 in 57 households. The following census in 2011 counted 270 people in 66 households. The 2016 census measured the population of the village as 244 people in 72 households.
