= Qaleh-ye Arzeh Khvoran =

Village in Zanjan province, Iran

Qaleh-ye Arzeh Khvoran Persian: قلعه ارزه خوران
- Village
- Location within Iran
- Coordinates: 36°53′18″N 47°19′38″E
- Country: Iran
- Province: Zanjan
- County: Mahneshan
- District: Central
- Rural District: Owryad

Population (2016)
  - Total: 159
- Time zone: UTC+3:30 (IRST)

Qaleh-ye Arzeh Khvoran (Persian: قلعه ارزه خوران) (Note: Also romanized as Qal‘eh-ye Arzeh Khvorān and Qal‘eh-ye Arzehkhūrān) is a village in Owryad Rural District of the Central District in Mahneshan County, Zanjan province, Iran.

== Demographics ==
=== Population ===
At the time of the 2006 National Census, the village's population was 201 in 39 households. The following census in 2011 counted 168 people in 45 households. The 2016 census measured the population of the village as 159 people in 47 households.
