= Chaypareh =

Chaypareh (Persian: چايپاره) may refer to:

- Chaypareh County, in West Azerbaijan Province
- Chaypareh-ye Bala Rural District, in Zanjan Province
- Chaypareh-ye Pain Rural District, in Zanjan Province
