= Chenaq Bolagh, Zanjan =

Village in Zanjan province, Iran

Chenaq Bolagh Persian: چناقبلاغ
- Village
- Location within Iran
- Coordinates: 36°37′25″N 47°50′54″E
- Country: Iran
- Province: Zanjan
- County: Mahneshan
- District: Central
- Rural District: Qezel Gechilu

Population (2016)
  - Total: 162
- Time zone: UTC+3:30 (IRST)

Chenaq Bolagh (Persian: چناقبلاغ) (Note: Also romanized as Chenāq Bolāgh; formerly known as Eshratabad (عشرت‌آباد)) is a village in Qezel Gechilu Rural District of the Central District in Mahneshan County, Zanjan province, Iran.

== Demographics ==
=== Population ===
At the time of the 2006 National Census, the village's population was 163 in 36 households. The following census in 2011 counted 186 people in 47 households. The 2016 census measured the population of the village as 162 people in 50 households.
