= Aqbolagh-e Hasanabad =

Village in Zanjan province, Iran

Aqbolagh-e Hasanabad Persian: آقبلاغ حسن آباد
- Village
- Location within Iran
- Coordinates: 36°39′10″N 47°36′05″E
- Country: Iran
- Province: Zanjan
- County: Mahneshan
- District: Anguran
- Rural District: Anguran

Population (2016)
  - Total: 32
- Time zone: UTC+3:30 (IRST)

Aqbolagh-e Hasanabad (Persian: آقبلاغ حسن آباد) (Note: Also romanized as Āqbolāgh-e Ḩasanābād; formerly known as Aqbolagh-e Hasankhan (آقبلاغ حسنخان)) is a village in Anguran Rural District of Anguran District in Mahneshan County, Zanjan province, Iran.

== Demographics ==
=== Population ===
At the time of the 2006 National Census, the village's population was 59 in 15 households. The following census in 2011 counted 53 people in 16 households. The 2016 census measured the population of the village as 32 people in 12 households.
