= Nasirabad, Mahneshan =

Village in Zanjan province, Iran

Nasirabad Persian: نصيراباد
- Village
- Location within Iran
- Coordinates: 36°32′37″N 47°41′54″E
- Country: Iran
- Province: Zanjan
- County: Mahneshan
- District: Anguran
- Rural District: Anguran

Population (2016)
  - Total: 44
- Time zone: UTC+3:30 (IRST)

Nasirabad (Persian: نصيراباد) (Note: Also romanized as Naşīrābād; formerly known as Girjak (گیرجک)) is a village in Anguran Rural District of Anguran District in Mahneshan County, Zanjan province, Iran.

== Demographics ==
=== Population ===
At the time of the 2006 National Census, the village's population was 129 in 27 households. The following census in 2011 counted 104 people in 27 households. The 2016 census measured the population of the village as 44 people in 16 households.
