= Khezerchupan =

Village in Zanjan province, Iran

Khezerchupan Persian: خضرچوپان
- Village
- Location within Iran
- Coordinates: 36°49′06″N 47°14′03″E
- Country: Iran
- Province: Zanjan
- County: Mahneshan
- District: Central
- Rural District: Owryad

Population (2016)
  - Total: 218
- Time zone: UTC+3:30 (IRST)

Khezerchupan (Persian: خضرچوپان) (Note: Also romanized as Khez̤erchūpān) is a village in Owryad Rural District of the Central District in Mahneshan County, Zanjan province, Iran.

== Demographics ==
=== Population ===
At the time of the 2006 National Census, the village's population was 279 in 52 households. The following census in 2011 counted 246 people in 47 households. The 2016 census measured the population of the village as 218 people in 74 households.
