= Qaleh Juq, Mahneshan =

Village in Zanjan province, Iran

Qaleh Juq Persian: قلعه جوق
- Village
- Location within Iran
- Coordinates: 36°49′21″N 47°26′16″E
- Country: Iran
- Province: Zanjan
- County: Mahneshan
- District: Central
- Rural District: Owryad

Population (2016)
  - Total: 17
- Time zone: UTC+3:30 (IRST)

Qaleh Juq (Persian: قلعه جوق) (Note: Also romanized as Qal‘eh Jūq) is a village in Owryad Rural District of the Central District in Mahneshan County, Zanjan province, Iran.

== Demographics ==
=== Population ===
At the time of the 2006 National Census, the village's population was 52 in 11 households. The following census in 2011 counted 34 people in seven households. The 2016 census measured the population of the village as 17 people in four households.
