= Sheykhlar, Zanjan =

Village in Zanjan province, Iran

Sheykhlar Persian: شيخ لر
- Village
- Location within Iran
- Coordinates: 36°35′48″N 47°29′02″E
- Country: Iran
- Province: Zanjan
- County: Mahneshan
- District: Anguran
- Rural District: Anguran

Population (2016)
  - Total: 191
- Time zone: UTC+3:30 (IRST)

Sheykhlar (Persian: شيخ لر) (Note: Also romanized as Sheykhlar) is a village in Anguran Rural District of Anguran District in Mahneshan County, Zanjan province, Iran.

== Demographics ==
=== Population ===
At the time of the 2006 National Census, the village's population was 188 in 41 households. The following census in 2011 counted 188 people in 57 households. The 2016 census measured the population of the village as 191 people in 54 households.
