= Qareh Nas =

Village in Zanjan province, Iran

Qareh Nas Persian: قره نا س
- Village
- Location within Iran
- Coordinates: 36°40′51″N 47°28′17″E
- Country: Iran
- Province: Zanjan
- County: Mahneshan
- District: Anguran
- Rural District: Anguran

Population (2016)
  - Total: 490
- Time zone: UTC+3:30 (IRST)

Qareh Nas (Persian: قره نا س) (Note: Also romanized as Qareh Nās; also known as Qarah Nāz) is a village in Anguran Rural District of Anguran District in Mahneshan County, Zanjan province, Iran.

== Demographics ==
=== Population ===
At the time of the 2006 National Census, the village's population was 656 in 143 households. The following census in 2011 counted 606 people in 170 households. The 2016 census measured the population of the village as 490 people in 143 households.
