= Uj Musa =

Village in Zanjan province, Iran

Uj Musa Persian: عوج موسي
- Village
- Location within Iran
- Coordinates: 36°48′46″N 47°37′47″E
- Country: Iran
- Province: Zanjan
- County: Mahneshan
- District: Central
- Rural District: Mah Neshan

Population (2016)
  - Total: 35
- Time zone: UTC+3:30 (IRST)

Uj Musa (Persian: عوج موسي) (Note: Also romanized as ‘Ūj Mūsá; also known as Owjālū Mūsá) is a village in Mah Neshan Rural District of the Central District in Mahneshan County, Zanjan province, Iran.

== Demographics ==
=== Population ===
At the time of the 2006 National Census, the village's population was 34 in seven households. The following census in 2011 counted 30 people in nine households. The 2016 census measured the population of the village as 35 people in 11 households.
