= Beyamlu =

Village in Zanjan province, Iran

Beyamlu Persian: بياملو
- Village
- Location within Iran
- Coordinates: 36°41′53″N 47°39′15″E
- Country: Iran
- Province: Zanjan
- County: Mahneshan
- District: Central
- Rural District: Mah Neshan

Population (2016)
  - Total: 25
- Time zone: UTC+3:30 (IRST)

Beyamlu (Persian: بياملو) (Note: Also romanized as Beyāmlū) is a village in Mah Neshan Rural District of the Central District in Mahneshan County, Zanjan province, Iran.

== Demographics ==
=== Population ===
At the time of the 2006 National Census, the village's population was 20 in five households. The following census in 2011 counted 12 people in five households. The 2016 census measured the population of the village as 25 people in six households.
