= Zamayen =

Village in Zanjan province, Iran

Zamayen Persian: زماين
- Village
- Location within Iran
- Coordinates: 36°33′17″N 47°38′30″E
- Country: Iran
- Province: Zanjan
- County: Mahneshan
- District: Anguran
- Rural District: Anguran

Population (2016)
  - Total: 228
- Time zone: UTC+3:30 (IRST)

Zamayen (Persian: زماين) (Note: Also romanized as Zamāyen) is a village in Anguran Rural District of Anguran District in Mahneshan County, Zanjan province, Iran.

== Demographics ==
=== Population ===
At the time of the 2006 National Census, the village's population was 175 in 40 households. The following census in 2011 counted 212 people in 65 households. The 2016 census measured the population of the village as 228 people in 67 households.
