= Pari, Iran =

Village in Zanjan province, Iran

Pari Persian: پري
- Village
- Location within Iran
- Coordinates: 36°52′39″N 47°25′06″E
- Country: Iran
- Province: Zanjan
- County: Mahneshan
- District: Central
- Rural District: Owryad

Population (2016)
  - Total: 855
- Time zone: UTC+3:30 (IRST)

Pari (Persian: پري) (Note: Also romanized as Parī) is a village in, and the capital of, Owryad Rural District in the Central District of Mahneshan County, Zanjan province, Iran.

== Demographics ==
=== Population ===
At the time of the 2006 National Census, the village's population was 777 in 177 households. The following census in 2011 counted 933 people in 189 households. The 2016 census measured the population of the village as 855 people in 247 households. It was the most populous village in its rural district.

== Notable people ==
Iranian Cleric Seyed Esmaeil Mousavi Zanjani is from here.
