= Akiz Qeshlaq =

Village in Zanjan province, Iran

Akiz Qeshlaq Persian: اكيزقشلاق
- Village
- Location within Iran
- Coordinates: 36°36′46″N 47°39′57″E
- Country: Iran
- Province: Zanjan
- County: Mahneshan
- District: Anguran
- Rural District: Anguran

Population (2016)
  - Total: 48
- Time zone: UTC+3:30 (IRST)

Akiz Qeshlaq (Persian: اكيزقشلاق) (Note: Also romanized as Akīz Qeshlāq; also known as Akaz Qeshlāq and Akīz Qeshlāqī) is a village in Anguran Rural District of Anguran District in Mahneshan County, Zanjan province, Iran.

== Demographics ==
=== Population ===
At the time of the 2006 National Census, the village's population was 51 in 10 households. The following census in 2011 counted 53 people in 14 households. The 2016 census measured the population of the village as 48 people in 14 households.
