= Istigol =

Village in Zanjan province, Iran

Istigol Persian: استي گل
- Village
- Location within Iran
- Coordinates: 36°38′32″N 47°33′34″E
- Country: Iran
- Province: Zanjan
- County: Mahneshan
- District: Anguran
- Rural District: Anguran

Population (2016)
  - Total: 57
- Time zone: UTC+3:30 (IRST)

Istigol (Persian: استي گل) (Note: Also romanized as Īstīgol; also known as Īstī Qol and Isti Fuq (استی فوق)) is a village in Anguran Rural District of Anguran District in Mahneshan County, Zanjan province, Iran.

== Demographics ==
=== Population ===
At the time of the 2006 National Census, the village's population was 81 in 23 households. The following census in 2011 counted 61 people in 19 households. The 2016 census measured the population of the village as 57 people in 18 households.
