= Gondi, Zanjan =

Village in Zanjan province, Iran

Gondi Persian: گندي
- Village
- Location within Iran
- Coordinates: 36°46′40″N 47°34′59″E
- Country: Iran
- Province: Zanjan
- County: Mahneshan
- District: Central
- Rural District: Mah Neshan

Population (2016)
  - Total: 234
- Time zone: UTC+3:30 (IRST)

Gondi (Persian: گندي) (Note: Also romanized as Gondī) is a village in Mah Neshan Rural District of the Central District in Mahneshan County, Zanjan province, Iran.

== Demographics ==
=== Population ===
At the time of the 2006 National Census, the village's population was 254 in 57 households. The following census in 2011 counted 188 people in 48 households. The 2016 census measured the population of the village as 234 people in 60 households.
