= Incheh-ye Olya, Zanjan =

Village in Zanjan province, Iran

Incheh-ye Olya Persian: اينچه عليا
- Village
- Location within Iran
- Coordinates: 36°40′07″N 47°34′51″E
- Country: Iran
- Province: Zanjan
- County: Mahneshan
- District: Anguran
- Rural District: Anguran

Population (2016)
  - Total: 0
- Time zone: UTC+3:30 (IRST)

Incheh-ye Olya (Persian: اينچه عليا) (Note: Also romanized as Īncheh-ye ‘Olyā) is a village in Anguran Rural District of Anguran District in Mahneshan County, Zanjan province, Iran.

== Demographics ==
=== Population ===
At the time of the 2006 National Census, the village's population was 55 in 13 households. The village did not appear in the following census of 2011. The 2016 census measured the population of the village as zero.
