= Chay Qeshlaqi =

Village in Zanjan province, Iran

Chay Qeshlaqi Persian: چای قشلاقی
- Village
- Location within Iran
- Coordinates: 36°48′17″N 47°16′56″E
- Country: Iran
- Province: Zanjan
- County: Mahneshan
- District: Central
- Rural District: Owryad

Population (2016)
  - Total: 75
- Time zone: UTC+3:30 (IRST)

Chay Qeshlaqi (Persian: چای قشلاقی) (Note: Also romanized as Chāy Qeshlāqī; also known as Chāy Qeshlāq) is a village in Owryad Rural District of the Central District in Mahneshan County, Zanjan province, Iran.

== Demographics ==
=== Population ===
At the time of the 2006 National Census, the village's population was 133 in 28 households. The following census in 2011 counted 109 people in 24 households. The 2016 census measured the population of the village as 75 people in 26 households.
