= Takhteh Yurd =

Village in Zanjan province, Iran

Takhteh Yurd Persian: تخته يورد
- Village
- Location within Iran
- Coordinates: 36°47′27″N 47°21′03″E
- Country: Iran
- Province: Zanjan
- County: Mahneshan
- District: Central
- Rural District: Owryad

Population (2016)
  - Total: 312
- Time zone: UTC+3:30 (IRST)

Takhteh Yurd (Persian: تخته يورد) (Note: Also romanized as Takhteh Yūrd) is a village in Owryad Rural District of the Central District in Mahneshan County, Zanjan province, Iran.

== Demographics ==
=== Population ===
At the time of the 2006 National Census, the village's population was 429 in 75 households. The following census in 2011 counted 351 people in 75 households. The 2016 census measured the population of the village as 312 people in 89 households.
