= Borun Qeshlaq =

Village in Zanjan province, Iran

Borun Qeshlaq Persian: برون قشلاق
- Village
- Location within Iran
- Coordinates: 36°38′09″N 47°46′59″E
- Country: Iran
- Province: Zanjan
- County: Mahneshan
- District: Central
- Rural District: Qezel Gechilu

Population (2016)
  - Total: 509
- Time zone: UTC+3:30 (IRST)

Borun Qeshlaq (Persian: برون قشلاق) (Note: Also romanized as Borūn Qeshlāq; also known as Bīrūn Qeshlāq) is a village in Qezel Gechilu Rural District of the Central District in Mahneshan County, Zanjan province, Iran.

== Demographics ==
=== Population ===
At the time of the 2006 National Census, the village's population was 429 in 110 households. The following census in 2011 counted 438 people in 126 households. The 2016 census measured the population of the village as 509 people in 159 households. It was the most populous village in its rural district.
