= Hajji Eynak =

Village in Zanjan province, Iran

Hajji Eynak Persian: حاجي اينك
- Village
- Location within Iran
- Coordinates: 36°39′04″N 47°37′56″E
- Country: Iran
- Province: Zanjan
- County: Mahneshan
- District: Anguran
- Rural District: Anguran

Population (2016)
  - Total: 17
- Time zone: UTC+3:30 (IRST)

Hajji Eynak (Persian: حاجي اينك) (Note: Also romanized as Ḩājjī ‘Eynak and Ḩājjī Īnak; also known as Āqbolāgh) is a village in Anguran Rural District of Anguran District in Mahneshan County, Zanjan province, Iran.

== Demographics ==
=== Population ===
At the time of the 2006 National Census, the village's population was 25 in five households. The following census in 2011 counted 16 people in five households. The 2016 census measured the population of the village as 17 people in five households.
