= Yengejeh, Mahneshan =

Village in Zanjan province, Iran

Yengejeh Persian: ینگجه
- Village
- Location within Iran
- Coordinates: 36°52′05″N 47°34′37″E
- Country: Iran
- Province: Zanjan
- County: Mahneshan
- District: Central
- Rural District: Mah Neshan

Population (2016)
  - Total: 256
- Time zone: UTC+3:30 (IRST)

Yengejeh (Persian: ینگجه) (Note: Also known as Yangijah, Yengejeh-ye Sīnār, and YengīJeh) is a village in Mah Neshan Rural District of the Central District in Mahneshan County, Zanjan province, Iran.

== Demographics ==
=== Population ===
At the time of the 2006 National Census, the village's population was 451 in 91 households. The following census in 2011 counted 337 people in 83 households. The 2016 census measured the population of the village as 256 people in 83 households.

== Notable people ==
Mahdi Baqiri, Iranian cleric
