= Sarin Darreh, Mahneshan =

Village in Zanjan province, Iran

Sarin Darreh Persian: سرين دره
- Village
- Location within Iran
- Coordinates: 36°45′05″N 47°35′11″E
- Country: Iran
- Province: Zanjan
- County: Mahneshan
- District: Central
- Rural District: Mah Neshan

Population (2016)
  - Total: 98
- Time zone: UTC+3:30 (IRST)

Sarin Darreh (Persian: سرين دره) (Note: Also romanized as Sarīn Darreh) is a village in Mah Neshan Rural District of the Central District in Mahneshan County, Zanjan province, Iran.

== Demographics ==
=== Population ===
At the time of the 2006 National Census, the village's population was 173 in 42 households. The following census in 2011 counted 100 people in 25 households. The 2016 census measured the population of the village as 98 people in 25 households.
