= Boland Parchin =

Village in Zanjan province, Iran

Boland Parchin Persian: بلندپرچين
- Village
- Location within Iran
- Coordinates: 36°39′50″N 47°38′03″E
- Country: Iran
- Province: Zanjan
- County: Mahneshan
- District: Anguran
- Rural District: Anguran

Population (2016)
  - Total: 150
- Time zone: UTC+3:30 (IRST)

Boland Parchin (Persian: بلندپرچين) (Note: Also romanized as Boland Parchīn) is a village in Anguran Rural District of Anguran District in Mahneshan County, Zanjan province, Iran.

== Demographics ==
=== Population ===
At the time of the 2006 National Census, the village's population was 170 in 43 households. The following census in 2011 counted 144 people in 44 households. The 2016 census measured the population of the village as 150 people in 51 households.
