= Khuin =

Village in Zanjan province, Iran

Khuin Persian: خويين
- Village
- Location within Iran
- Coordinates: 36°50′09″N 47°19′20″E
- Country: Iran
- Province: Zanjan
- County: Mahneshan
- District: Central
- Rural District: Owryad

Population (2016)
  - Total: 50
- Time zone: UTC+3:30 (IRST)

Khuin (Persian: خويين) (Note: Also romanized as Khū’īn; also known as Khvoyūn) is a village in Owryad Rural District of the Central District in Mahneshan County, Zanjan province, Iran.

== Demographics ==
=== Population ===
At the time of the 2006 National Census, the village's population was 36 in eight households. The following census in 2011 counted 31 people in eight households. The 2016 census measured the population of the village as 50 people in 10 households.
