= Qezeljeh, Mahneshan =

Village in Zanjan province, Iran

Qezeljeh Persian: قزلجه
- Village
- Location within Iran
- Coordinates: 36°49′26″N 47°20′03″E
- Country: Iran
- Province: Zanjan
- County: Mahneshan
- District: Central
- Rural District: Owryad

Population (2016)
  - Total: 92
- Time zone: UTC+3:30 (IRST)

Qezeljeh (Persian: قزلجه) is a village in Owryad Rural District of the Central District in Mahneshan County, Zanjan province, Iran.

== Demographics ==
=== Population ===
At the time of the 2006 National Census, the village's population was 166 in 26 households. The following census in 2011 counted 122 people in 28 households. The 2016 census measured the population of the village as 92 people in 30 households.
