= Tak Aghaj, Zanjan =

Village in Zanjan province, Iran

Tak Aghaj Persian: تک‌آغاج
- Village
- Location within Iran
- Coordinates: 36°41′10″N 47°42′27″E
- Country: Iran
- Province: Zanjan
- County: Mahneshan
- District: Central
- Rural District: Mah Neshan

Population (2016)
  - Total: 149
- Time zone: UTC+3:30 (IRST)

Tak Aghaj (Persian: تک‌آغاج) (Note: Also romanized as Tak Āghāj; also known as Tak Āqāj) is a village in Mah Neshan Rural District of the Central District in Mahneshan County, Zanjan province, Iran.

== Demographics ==
=== Population ===
At the time of the 2006 National Census, the village's population was 173 in 37 households. The following census in 2011 counted 163 people in 46 households. The 2016 census measured the population of the village as 149 people in 43 households.
