= Qarah Gol, Mahneshan =

Village in Zanjan province, Iran

Qarah Gol Persian: برون قشلاق
- Village
- Location within Iran
- Coordinates: 36°35′59″N 47°49′49″E
- Country: Iran
- Province: Zanjan
- County: Mahneshan
- District: Central
- Rural District: Qezel Gechilu

Population (2016)
  - Total: 373
- Time zone: UTC+3:30 (IRST)

Qarah Gol (Persian: قره گل) (Note: Also romanized as Qareh Gol) is a village in, and the capital of, Qezel Gechilu Rural District in the Central District of Mahneshan County, Zanjan province, Iran.

== Demographics ==
=== Population ===
At the time of the 2006 National Census, the village's population was 426 in 113 households. The following census in 2011 counted 410 people in 96 households. The 2016 census measured the population of the village as 373 people in 133 households.
