= Tazeh Kand-e Fakhrlu =

Village in Zanjan province, Iran

Tazeh Kand-e Fakhrlu Persian: تازه كندفخرلو
- Village
- Location within Iran
- Coordinates: 36°47′49″N 47°24′04″E
- Country: Iran
- Province: Zanjan
- County: Mahneshan
- District: Central
- Rural District: Owryad

Population (2016)
  - Total: 164
- Time zone: UTC+3:30 (IRST)

Tazeh Kand-e Fakhrlu (Persian: تازه كندفخرلو) (Note: Also romanized as Tāzeh Kand-e Fakhrlū; also known as Tāzeh Kand and Tāzeh Kand-e Fakhr ‘Alī) is a village in Owryad Rural District of the Central District in Mahneshan County, Zanjan province, Iran.

== Demographics ==
=== Population ===
At the time of the 2006 National Census, the village's population was 296 in 62 households. The following census in 2011 counted 211 people in 56 households. The 2016 census measured the population of the village as 164 people in 54 households.
