= Siah Khaneh =

Village in Zanjan province, Iran

Siah Khaneh Persian: سياه خانه
- Village
- Location within Iran
- Coordinates: 36°38′44″N 47°30′50″E
- Country: Iran
- Province: Zanjan
- County: Mahneshan
- District: Anguran
- Rural District: Anguran

Population (2016)
  - Total: 30
- Time zone: UTC+3:30 (IRST)

Siah Khaneh (Persian: سياه خانه) (Note: Also romanized as Sīāh Khāneh and Sīyāh Khāneh) is a village in Anguran Rural District of Anguran District in Mahneshan County, Zanjan province, Iran.

== Demographics ==
=== Population ===
At the time of the 2006 National Census, the village's population was 39 in 12 households. The following census in 2011 counted 30 people in nine households. The 2016 census measured the population of the village as 30 people in 11 households.
