= Kardi, Iran =

Village in Zanjan province, Iran

Kardi Persian: كردي
- Village
- Location within Iran
- Coordinates: 36°49′46″N 47°30′10″E
- Country: Iran
- Province: Zanjan
- County: Mahneshan
- District: Central
- Rural District: Mah Neshan

Population (2016)
  - Total: 286
- Time zone: UTC+3:30 (IRST)

Kardi (Persian: كردي) (Note: Also romanized as Kardī) is a village in Mah Neshan Rural District of the Central District in Mahneshan County, Zanjan province, Iran.

== Demographics ==
=== Population ===
At the time of the 2006 National Census, the village's population was 298 in 63 households. The following census in 2011 counted 236 people in 70 households. The 2016 census measured the population of the village as 286 people in 95 households.
