= Kusaj-e Sofla =

Village in Zanjan province, Iran

Kusaj-e Sofla Persian: كوسج سفلي
- Village
- Location within Iran
- Coordinates: 36°30′03″N 47°30′23″E
- Country: Iran
- Province: Zanjan
- County: Mahneshan
- District: Anguran
- Rural District: Anguran

Population (2016)
  - Total: 195
- Time zone: UTC+3:30 (IRST)

Kusaj-e Sofla (Persian: كوسج سفلي) (Note: Also romanized as Kūsaj-e Soflá) is a village in Anguran Rural District of Anguran District in Mahneshan County, Zanjan province, Iran.

== Demographics ==
=== Population ===
At the time of the 2006 National Census, the village's population was 274 in 54 households. The following census in 2011 counted 180 people in 52 households. The 2016 census measured the population of the village as 195 people in 64 households.
