= Anguran Rural District =

Rural district in Zanjan province, Iran

Anguran Rural District Persian: دهستان انگوران
- Rural District
- Location within Iran
- Coordinates: 36°34′N 47°31′E
- Country: Iran
- Province: Zanjan
- County: Mahneshan
- District: Anguran
- Established: 1987
- Capital: Dandi

Population (2016)
  - Total: 7,890
- Time zone: UTC+3:30 (IRST)

Anguran Rural District (Persian: دهستان انگوران) is in Anguran District of Mahneshan County, Zanjan province, Iran. It is administered from the city of Dandi.

== Demographics ==
=== Population ===
At the time of the 2006 National Census, the rural district's population was 9,457 in 2,101 households. There were 8,331 inhabitants in 2,513 households at the following census of 2011. The 2016 census measured the population of the rural district as 7,890 in 2,463 households. The most populous of its 54 villages was Anguran, with 1,282 people.

=== Other villages in the rural district ===
- Akiz Qeshlaq
- Amirabad
- Aqbolagh-e Hasanabad
- Ayalu
- Boland Parchin
- Ganjabad
- Golablu
- Hajji Eynak
- Hasanabad
- Incheh-ye Olya
- Incheh-ye Sofla
- Istigol
- Kaka
- Kapaz
- Karvansara
- Khayinak
- Khezerabad
- Khvor Jahan
- Kusaj-e Olya
- Kusaj-e Sofla
- Mazraeh
- Merash
- Mianaj
- Nasirabad
- Qaleh Juq-e Sadat
- Qaragol
- Qareh Nas
- Qareh Zeki
- Qarqan-e Olya
- Qarqan-e Sofla
- Qeshlaq-e Juq-e Olya
- Qeshlaq-e Juq-e Sofla
- Qovaq-e Olya
- Qovaq-e Sofla
- Quzijaq-e Olya
- Quzijaq-e Sofla
- Quzlu
- Sagharchi
- Shahrak-e Halab
- Sheykhlar
- Siah Khaneh
- Yasti Qaleh
- Yengejeh
- Yusefabad
- Zamayen
