= Sarik, Zanjan =

Village in Zanjan province, Iran

Sarik Persian: سريك
- Village
- Location within Iran
- Coordinates: 36°43′14″N 47°42′10″E
- Country: Iran
- Province: Zanjan
- County: Mahneshan
- District: Central
- Rural District: Mah Neshan

Population (2016)
  - Total: 904
- Time zone: UTC+3:30 (IRST)

Sarik (Persian: سريك) (Note: Also romanized as Sarīk) is a village in, and the capital of, Mah Neshan Rural District in the Central District of Mahneshan County, Zanjan province, Iran. The rural district was previously administered from the city of Mah Neshan.

== Demographics ==
=== Population ===
At the time of the 2006 National Census, the village's population was 668 in 158 households. The following census in 2011 counted 858 people in 228 households. The 2016 census measured the population of the village as 904 people in 263 households.
