= Sahand-e Sofla =

Village in Zanjan province, Iran

Sahand-e Sofla Persian: سهندسفلي
- Village
- Location within Iran
- Coordinates: 36°46′33″N 47°32′33″E
- Country: Iran
- Province: Zanjan
- County: Mahneshan
- District: Central
- Rural District: Mah Neshan

Population (2016)
  - Total: 731
- Time zone: UTC+3:30 (IRST)

Sahand-e Sofla (Persian: سهندسفلي) (Note: Also romanized as Sahand-e Soflá) is a village in Mah Neshan Rural District of the Central District in Mahneshan County, Zanjan province, Iran.

== Demographics ==
=== Population ===
At the time of the 2006 National Census, the village's population was 961 in 213 households. The following census in 2011 counted 864 people in 213 households. The 2016 census measured the population of the village as 731 people in 203 households.
