= Quzijaq-e Sofla =

Village in Zanjan province, Iran

Quzijaq-e Sofla Persian: قوزيجاق سفلي
- Village
- Location within Iran
- Coordinates: 36°26′13″N 47°27′50″E
- Country: Iran
- Province: Zanjan
- County: Mahneshan
- District: Anguran
- Rural District: Anguran

Population (2016)
  - Total: 134
- Time zone: UTC+3:30 (IRST)

Quzijaq-e Sofla (Persian: قوزيجاق سفلي) (Note: Also romanized as Qūzījāq-e Soflá) is a village in Anguran Rural District of Anguran District in Mahneshan County, Zanjan province, Iran.

== Demographics ==
=== Population ===
At the time of the 2006 National Census, the village's population was 165 in 29 households. The following census in 2011 counted 136 people in 29 households. The 2016 census measured the population of the village as 134 people in 37 households.
