= Mianaj, Anguran =

Village in Zanjan province, Iran

Mianaj Persian: ميانج
- Village
- Location within Iran
- Coordinates: 36°31′44″N 47°28′54″E
- Country: Iran
- Province: Zanjan
- County: Mahneshan
- District: Anguran
- Rural District: Anguran

Population (2016)
  - Total: 371
- Time zone: UTC+3:30 (IRST)

Mianaj (Persian: ميانج) (Note: Also romanized as Mīānaj and Mīyānaj) is a village in Anguran Rural District of Anguran District in Mahneshan County, Zanjan province, Iran.

== Demographics ==
=== Population ===
At the time of the 2006 National Census, the village's population was 465 in 104 households. The following census in 2011 counted 430 people in 135 households. The 2016 census measured the population of the village as 371 people in 125 households.
