= Sari Aghol, Zanjan =

Village in Zanjan province, Iran

Sari Aghol Persian: ساري اغل
- Village
- Location within Iran
- Coordinates: 36°49′21″N 47°37′46″E
- Country: Iran
- Province: Zanjan
- County: Mahneshan
- District: Central
- Rural District: Mah Neshan

Population (2016)
  - Total: 152
- Time zone: UTC+3:30 (IRST)

Sari Aghol (Persian: ساري اغل) (Note: Also romanized as Sārī Āghol) is a village in Mah Neshan Rural District in the Central District of Mahneshan County, Zanjan province, Iran.

== Demographics ==
=== Population ===
At the time of the 2006 National Census, the village's population was 142 in 29 households. The following census in 2011 recorded 123 people in 32 households. The 2016 census reported the population of the village as 152 people in 41 households.
