= Qeshlaq-e Juq-e Sofla =

Village in Zanjan province, Iran

Qeshlaq-e Juq-e Sofla Persian: قشلاق جوق سفلي
- Village
- Location within Iran
- Coordinates: 36°36′48″N 47°34′11″E
- Country: Iran
- Province: Zanjan
- County: Mahneshan
- District: Anguran
- Rural District: Anguran

Population (2016)
  - Total: 64
- Time zone: UTC+3:30 (IRST)

Qeshlaq-e Juq-e Sofla (Persian: قشلاق جوق سفلي) (Note: Also romanized as Qeshlāq-e Jūq-e Soflá; also known as Qeshlāq Jūg-e Soflá) is a village in Anguran Rural District of Anguran District in Mahneshan County, Zanjan province, Iran.

== Demographics ==
=== Population ===
At the time of the 2006 National Census, the village's population was 95 in 27 households. The following census in 2011 counted 76 people in 22 households. The 2016 census measured the population of the village as 64 people in 21 households.
