= Qarqan-e Olya =

Village in Zanjan province, Iran

Qarqan-e Olya Persian: قرقان عليا
- Village
- Location within Iran
- Coordinates: 36°24′11″N 47°38′11″E
- Country: Iran
- Province: Zanjan
- County: Mahneshan
- District: Anguran
- Rural District: Anguran

Population (2016)
  - Total: 68
- Time zone: UTC+3:30 (IRST)

Qarqan-e Olya (Persian: قرقان عليا) (Note: Also romanized as Qarqān-e ‘Olyā; also known as Qūrqān-e ‘Olyā) is a village in Anguran Rural District of Anguran District in Mahneshan County, Zanjan province, Iran.

== Demographics ==
=== Population ===
At the time of the 2006 National Census, the village's population was 83 in 19 households. The following census in 2011 counted 81 people in 25 households. The 2016 census measured the population of the village as 68 people in 22 households.
