= Kusaj-e Olya =

Village in Zanjan province, Iran

Kusaj-e Olya Persian: كوسج عليا
- Village
- Location within Iran
- Coordinates: 36°29′22″N 47°30′22″E
- Country: Iran
- Province: Zanjan
- County: Mahneshan
- District: Anguran
- Rural District: Anguran

Population (2016)
  - Total: 315
- Time zone: UTC+3:30 (IRST)

Kusaj-e Olya (Persian: كوسج عليا) (Note: Also romanized as Kūsaj-e ‘Olyā) is a village in Anguran Rural District of Anguran District in Mahneshan County, Zanjan province, Iran.

== Demographics ==
=== Population ===
At the time of the 2006 National Census, the village's population was 400 in 66 households. The following census in 2011 counted 307 people in 98 households. The 2016 census measured the population of the village as 315 people in 98 households.
