= Qezel Gechilu Rural District =

Rural district in Zanjan province, Iran

Qezel Gechilu Rural District Persian: دهستان قزل گچيلو
- Rural District
- Location within Iran
- Coordinates: 36°35′30″N 47°51′30″E
- Country: Iran
- Province: Zanjan
- County: Mahneshan
- District: Central
- Established: 1987
- Capital: Qarah Gol

Population (2016)
  - Total: 1,974
- Time zone: UTC+3:30 (IRST)

Qezel Gechilu Rural District (Persian: دهستان قزل گچيلو) is in the Central District of Mahneshan County, Zanjan province, Iran. Its capital is the village of Qarah Gol.

== Demographics ==
=== Population ===
At the time of the 2006 National Census, the rural district's population was 2,348 in 581 households. There were 2,180 inhabitants in 586 households at the following census of 2011. The 2016 census measured the population of the rural district as 1,974 in 643 households. The most populous of its 10 villages was Borun Qeshlaq, with 509 people.

=== Other villages in the rural district ===
- Amirabad
- Chataz
- Chenaq Bolagh
- Guni
- Incheh-ye Said Nezam
- Moghanlu
