= Owryad Rural District =

Rural district in Zanjan province, Iran

Owryad Rural District Persian: دهستان اورياد
- Rural District
- Location within Iran
- Coordinates: 36°49′N 47°21′E
- Country: Iran
- Province: Zanjan
- County: Mahneshan
- District: Central
- Established: 1987
- Capital: Pari

Population (2016)
  - Total: 5,196
- Time zone: UTC+3:30 (IRST)

Owryad Rural District (Persian: دهستان اورياد) is in the Central District of Mahneshan County, Zanjan province, Iran. Its capital is the village of Pari.

== Demographics ==
=== Population ===
At the time of the 2006 National Census, the rural district's population was 6,413 in 1,299 households. There were 5,537 inhabitants in 1,308 households at the following census of 2011. The 2016 census measured the population of the rural district as 5,196 in 1,586 households. The most populous of its 29 villages was Pari, with 855 people.

=== Other villages in the rural district ===
- Alam Kandi
- Arzeh Khvoran
- Beyanlu
- Chay Qeshlaqi
- Hasanabad-e Jadid
- Hasanabad-e Qadim
- Kelisa
- Khandaqlu
- Kheyrabad
- Khezerchupan
- Khuin
- Lahjebin
- Lardeh Shur
- Mianaj
- Owrjak
- Qaleh Juq
- Qaleh-ye Arzeh Khvoran
- Qarah Dash
- Qazi Kandi
- Qezeljeh
- Said Kandi
- Takhteh Yurd
- Tazeh Kand-e Fakhrlu
- Tat Qeshlaq
