= Qarqan-e Sofla =

Village in Zanjan province, Iran

Qarqan-e Sofla Persian: قرقان سفلي
- Village
- Location within Iran
- Coordinates: 36°23′58″N 47°38′11″E
- Country: Iran
- Province: Zanjan
- County: Mahneshan
- District: Anguran
- Rural District: Anguran

Population (2016)
  - Total: 56
- Time zone: UTC+3:30 (IRST)

Qarqan-e Sofla (Persian: قرقان سفلي) (Note: Also romanized as Qarqān-e Soflá; also known as Qūrqān-e Soflá) is a village in Anguran Rural District of Anguran District in Mahneshan County, Zanjan province, Iran.

== Demographics ==
=== Population ===
At the time of the 2006 National Census, the village's population was 91 in 19 households. The following census in 2011 counted 82 people in 23 households. The 2016 census measured the population of the village as 56 people in 17 households.
