= Said Kandi, Mahneshan =

Village in Zanjan province, Iran

Said Kandi Persian: سعيدكندي
- Village
- Location within Iran
- Coordinates: 36°50′20″N 47°18′35″E
- Country: Iran
- Province: Zanjan
- County: Mahneshan
- District: Central
- Rural District: Owryad

Population (2016)
  - Total: 252
- Time zone: UTC+3:30 (IRST)

Said Kandi (Persian: سعيدكندي) (Note: Also romanized as Sa‘īd Kandī) is a village in Owryad Rural District of the Central District in Mahneshan County, Zanjan province, Iran.

== Demographics ==
=== Population ===
At the time of the 2006 National Census, the village's population was 416 in 73 households. The following census in 2011 counted 303 people in 23 households. The 2016 census measured the population of the village as 252 people in 69 households.
