= Quzijaq-e Olya =

Village in Zanjan province, Iran

Quzijaq-e Olya Persian: قوزيجاق عليا
- Village
- Location within Iran
- Coordinates: 36°26′33″N 47°26′40″E
- Country: Iran
- Province: Zanjan
- County: Mahneshan
- District: Anguran
- Rural District: Anguran

Population (2016)
  - Total: 98
- Time zone: UTC+3:30 (IRST)

Quzijaq-e Olya (Persian: قوزيجاق عليا) (Note: Also romanized as Qūzījāq-e ‘Olyā) is a village in Anguran Rural District of Anguran District in Mahneshan County, Zanjan province, Iran.

== Demographics ==
=== Population ===
At the time of the 2006 National Census, the village's population was 119 in 27 households. The 2011 census counted 112 people in 34 households. The 2016 census measured the village population as 98 people in 35 households.
