= Mianaj, Mahneshan =

Village in Zanjan province, Iran

Mianaj Persian: ميانج
- Village
- Location within Iran
- Coordinates: 36°54′19″N 47°26′33″E
- Country: Iran
- Province: Zanjan
- County: Mahneshan
- District: Central
- Rural District: Owryad

Population (2016)
  - Total: 95
- Time zone: UTC+3:30 (IRST)

Mianaj (Persian: ميانج) (Note: Also romanized as Mīānaj) is a village in Owryad Rural District of the Central District in Mahneshan County, Zanjan province, Iran.

== Demographics ==
=== Population ===
At the time of the 2006 National Census, the village's population was 130 in 28 households. The following census in 2011 counted 110 people in 28 households. The 2016 census measured the population of the village as 95 people in 30 households.
