= Khezerabad, Zanjan =

Village in Zanjan province, Iran

Khezerabad Persian: خضراباد
- Village
- Location within Iran
- Coordinates: 36°30′06″N 47°33′45″E
- Country: Iran
- Province: Zanjan
- County: Mahneshan
- District: Anguran
- Rural District: Anguran

Population (2016)
  - Total: 34
- Time zone: UTC+3:30 (IRST)

Khezerabad (Persian: خضراباد) (Note: Also romanized as Kheẕerābād; formerly known as Khezershah (خضرشاه)) is a village in Anguran Rural District of Anguran District in Mahneshan County, Zanjan province, Iran.

== Demographics ==
=== Language ===
The mother tongue of people is Azerbaijani Turkish. The majority of the village's population immigrated to other cities around Zanjan or Tehran in 1980s and 1990s. Some of the family names related to this village are Heidari, Hemmat Khanlou, and Mohammadi.

=== Population ===
At the time of the 2006 National Census, the village's population was 88 in 21 households. The following census in 2011 counted 38 people in 12 households. The 2016 census measured the population of the village as 34 people in 10 households.
