= Mah Neshan Rural District =

Rural district in Zanjan province, Iran

Mah Neshan Rural District Persian: دهستان ماه نشان
- Rural District
- Location within Iran
- Coordinates: 36°46′N 47°38′E
- Country: Iran
- Province: Zanjan
- County: Mahneshan
- District: Central
- Established: 1987
- Capital: Sarik

Population (2016)
  - Total: 9,604
- Time zone: UTC+3:30 (IRST)

Mah Neshan Rural District (Persian: دهستان ماه نشان) is in the Central District of Mahneshan County, Zanjan province, Iran. Its capital is the village of Sarik. The rural district was previously administered from the city of Mah Neshan.

== Demographics ==
=== Population ===
At the time of the 2006 National Census, the rural district's population was 10,168 in 2,308 households. There were 9,866 inhabitants in 2,626 households at the following census of 2011. The 2016 census measured the population of the rural district as 9,604 in 2,867 households. The most populous of its 36 villages was Ili Bolagh, with 1,155 people.

=== Other villages in the rural district ===
- Almalu
- Aq Kand
- Baghcheh
- Behestan
- Beyamlu
- Gondi
- Kardi
- Khalaj
- Madabad
- Mazraeh-ye Leylan
- Poshtak
- Qarah Batlaq
- Raz
- Sahand-e Olya
- Sahand-e Sofla
- Sar-e Pol
- Sari Aghol
- Sarin Darreh
- Tak Aghaj
- Uj Musa
- Vehran
- Yengejeh
