= Qazi Kandi, Zanjan =

Village in Zanjan province, Iran

Qazi Kandi Persian: قاضي كندي
- Village
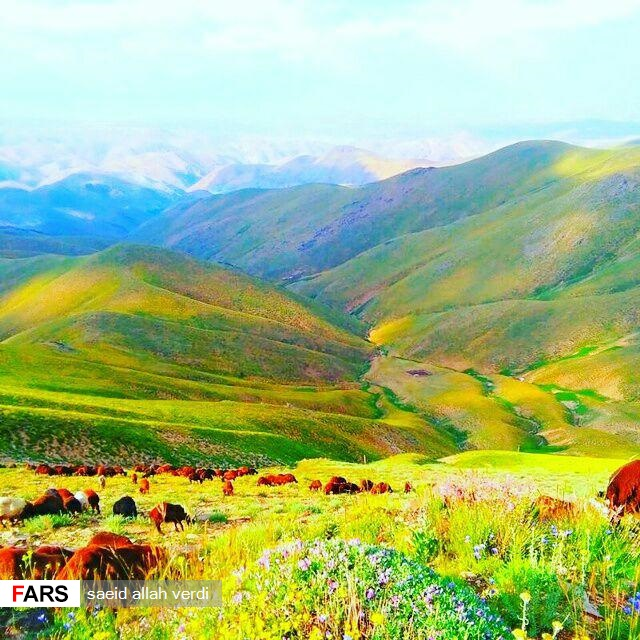
- Nature of Ghazi Kandi village in Mahneshan county

- Location within Iran
- Coordinates: 36°48′06″N 47°26′31″E
- Country: Iran
- Province: Zanjan
- County: Mahneshan
- District: Central
- Rural District: Owryad

Population (2016)
  - Total: 365
- Time zone: UTC+3:30 (IRST)

Qazi Kandi (Persian: قاضي كندي) (Note: Also romanized as Qāzī Kandī and Qāẕī Kandī) is a village in Owryad Rural District of the Central District in Mahneshan County, Zanjan province, Iran.

== Demographics ==
=== Population ===
At the time of the 2006 National Census, the village's population was 369 in 86 households. The following census in 2011 counted 230 people in 80 households. The 2016 census measured the population of the village as 365 people in 117 households.
