= Qeshlaq-e Juq-e Olya =

Village in Zanjan province, Iran

Qeshlaq-e Juq-e Olya Persian: قشلاق جوق عليا
- Village
- Location within Iran
- Coordinates: 36°37′03″N 47°33′46″E
- Country: Iran
- Province: Zanjan
- County: Mahneshan
- District: Anguran
- Rural District: Anguran

Population (2016)
  - Total: 38
- Time zone: UTC+3:30 (IRST)

Qeshlaq-e Juq-e Olya (Persian: قشلاق جوق عليا) (Note: Also romanized as Qeshlāq-e Jūq-e ‘Olyā; also known as Qeshlāq Jūg-e ‘Olyā) is a village in Anguran Rural District of Anguran District in Mahneshan County, Zanjan province, Iran.

== Demographics ==
=== Population ===
At the time of the 2006 National Census, the village's population was 77 in 23 households. The following census in 2011 counted 52 people in 16 households. The 2016 census measured the population of the village as 38 people in 11 households.
