= Sahand-e Olya =

Village in Zanjan province, Iran

Sahand-e Olya Persian: سهندعليا
- Village
- Location within Iran
- Coordinates: 36°46′39″N 47°31′15″E
- Country: Iran
- Province: Zanjan
- County: Mahneshan
- District: Central
- Rural District: Mah Neshan

Population (2016)
  - Total: 649
- Time zone: UTC+3:30 (IRST)

Sahand-e Olya (Persian: سهندعليا) (Note: Also romanized as Sahand Olya and Sahand-e ‘Olyā) is a village in Mah Neshan Rural District of the Central District in Mahneshan County, Zanjan province, Iran.

== Demographics ==
=== Population ===
At the time of the 2006 National Census, the village's population was 974 in 231 households. The following census in 2011 counted 841 people in 232 households. The 2016 census measured the population of the village as 649 people in 201 households.
