= Beyanlu, Zanjan =

Village in Zanjan province, Iran

Beyanlu Persian: بيانلو
- Village
- Location within Iran
- Coordinates: 36°51′10″N 47°21′51″E
- Country: Iran
- Province: Zanjan
- County: Mahneshan
- District: Central
- Rural District: Owryad

Population (2016)
  - Total: 181
- Time zone: UTC+3:30 (IRST)

Beyanlu (Persian: بيانلو) (Note: Also romanized as Beyānlū) is a village in Owryad Rural District of the Central District in Mahneshan County, Zanjan province, Iran.

== Demographics ==
=== Population ===
At the time of the 2006 National Census, the village's population was 214 in 36 households. The following census in 2011 counted 174 people in 32 households. The 2016 census measured the population of the village as 181 people in 49 households.
