= Behestan, Ardabil =

Village in Iran

Behestan
- Location in Iran
- Coordinates: 37°37′06″N 48°21′34″E
- Country: Iran
- Province: Ardabil Province
- Time zone: UTC+3:30 (IRST)
  - Summer (DST): UTC+4:30 (IRDT)

Behestan is a village in the Ardabil Province of Iran.
