= Qazi Kand =

Qazi Kand قاضي كند
- Village
- Location within Iran
- Coordinates: 37°18′10″N 48°01′40″E
- Country: Iran
- Province: East Azerbaijan
- County: Meyaneh
- Bakhsh: Kaghazkonan
- Rural District: Qaflankuh-e Sharqi

Population (2006)
  - Total: 138
- Time zone: UTC+3:30 (IRST)
  - Summer (DST): UTC+4:30 (IRDT)

Qazi Kand (Persian: قاضي كند, also Romanized as Qāẕī Kand; also known as Kazi-Kandi and Qāẕīkandī) is a village in Qaflankuh-e Sharqi Rural District, Kaghazkonan District, Meyaneh County, East Azerbaijan Province, Iran. At the 2006 census, its population was 138, in 28 families.
