= Qeytul, Zanjan =

Village in Zanjan province, Iran

Qeytul Persian: قيطول
- Village
- Location within Iran
- Coordinates: 37°06′36″N 47°47′32″E
- Country: Iran
- Province: Zanjan
- County: Zanjan
- District: Zanjanrud
- Rural District: Chaypareh-ye Bala

Population (2016)
  - Total: 242
- Time zone: UTC+3:30 (IRST)

Qeytul (Persian: قيطول) (Note: Also romanized as Qeyţūl) is a village in Chaypareh-ye Bala Rural District of Zanjanrud District in Zanjan County, Zanjan province, Iran.

== Demographics ==
=== Population ===
At the time of the 2006 National Census, the village's population was 383 in 95 households. The following census in 2011 counted 315 people in 90 households. The 2016 census measured the population of the village as 242 people in 79 households.
