= Bianlu, West Azerbaijan =

Bianlu بيانلو
- Village
- Location within Iran
- Coordinates: 38°29′59″N 44°45′41″E
- Country: Iran
- Province: West Azerbaijan
- County: Khoy
- Bakhsh: Central
- Rural District: Rahal

Population (2006)
  - Total: 354
- Time zone: UTC+3:30 (IRST)
  - Summer (DST): UTC+4:30 (IRDT)

Bianlu (Persian: بيانلو, also Romanized as Bīānlū) is a village in Rahal Rural District, in the Central District of Khoy County, West Azerbaijan Province, Iran. At the 2006 census, its population was 354, in 58 families.
