= Aylan =

Village in Zanjan province, Iran

Aylan Persian: ايلن
- Village
- Location within Iran
- Coordinates: 36°56′56″N 47°51′22″E
- Country: Iran
- Province: Zanjan
- County: Zanjan
- District: Zanjanrud
- Rural District: Chaypareh-ye Bala

Population (2016)
  - Total: 89
- Time zone: UTC+3:30 (IRST)

Aylan (Persian: ايلن) (Note: Also romanized as Ailan and Āilan) is a village in Chaypareh-ye Bala Rural District of Zanjanrud District in Zanjan County, Zanjan province, Iran.

== Demographics ==
=== Population ===
At the time of the 2006 National Census, the village's population was 90 in 15 households. The following census in 2011 counted 98 people in 20 households. The 2016 census measured the population of the village as 89 people in 20 households.
