= Mah Neshan =

City in Zanjan province, Iran

Mah Neshan Persian: ماه نشان
- City
- Location within Iran
- Coordinates: 36°44′37″N 47°40′25″E
- Country: Iran
- Province: Zanjan
- County: Mahneshan
- District: Central
- Established as a city: 1995

Population (2016)
  - Total: 5,487
- Time zone: UTC+3:30 (IRST)

Mah Neshan (Persian: ماه نشان (Note: Also romanized as Māh Neshān and Māhneshān) is a city in the Central District of Mahneshan County, Zanjan province, Iran, serving as capital of both the county and the district. It was the administrative center for Mah Neshan Rural District until its capital was transferred to the village of Sarik. The village of Mah Neshan was converted to a city in 1995.

== Demographics ==
=== Population ===
At the time of the 2006 National Census, the city's population was 4,495 in 1,119 households. The following census in 2011 counted 5,439 people in 1,422 households. The 2016 census measured the population of the city as 5,487 people in 1,626 households.

== Climate ==
Climate data for Mah Neshan (altitude:1,282.0 m (4,206.0 ft), 2001-2010 normals)
Month	Jan	Feb	Mar	Apr	May	Jun	Jul	Aug	Sep	Oct	Nov	Dec	Year
Daily mean °C (°F)	−0.2 (31.6)	3.7 (38.7)	9.8 (49.6)	14.0 (57.2)	18.7 (65.7)	24.4 (75.9)	27.3 (81.1)	27.3 (81.1)	23.0 (73.4)	17.2 (63.0)	8.5 (47.3)	3.1 (37.6)	14.7 (58.5)
Average precipitation mm (inches)	20.3 (0.80)	32.8 (1.29)	24.0 (0.94)	59.7 (2.35)	38.9 (1.53)	10.0 (0.39)	4.4 (0.17)	4.1 (0.16)	3.9 (0.15)	15.2 (0.60)	31.2 (1.23)	30.8 (1.21)	275.3 (10.82)
Average dew point °C (°F)	−6.4 (20.5)	−3.8 (25.2)	−2.1 (28.2)	2.0 (35.6)	5.2 (41.4)	7.4 (45.3)	9.7 (49.5)	8.9 (48.0)	4.7 (40.5)	3.0 (37.4)	−0.4 (31.3)	−3.7 (25.3)	2.0 (35.7)
Source: IRIMO
