= Qarah Owghlanlu =

Village in Zanjan province, Iran

Qarah Owghlanlu Persian: قره اوغلانلو
- Village
- Location within Iran
- Coordinates: 37°03′17″N 47°50′09″E
- Country: Iran
- Province: Zanjan
- County: Zanjan
- District: Zanjanrud
- Rural District: Chaypareh-ye Bala

Population (2016)
  - Total: 427
- Time zone: UTC+3:30 (IRST)

Qarah Owghlanlu (Persian: قره اوغلانلو) (Note: Also romanized as Qarah Owghlānlū and Qareh Ūghlānlū) is a village in Chaypareh-ye Bala Rural District of Zanjanrud District in Zanjan County, Zanjan province, Iran.

== Demographics ==
=== Population ===
At the time of the 2006 National Census, the village's population was 380 in 92 households. The following census in 2011 counted 416 people in 95 households. The 2016 census measured the population of the village as 427 people in 108 households.
