= Azizlu, Zanjan =

Village in Zanjan province, Iran

Azizlu Persian: عزيزلو
- Village
- Location within Iran
- Coordinates: 36°59′45″N 47°47′50″E
- Country: Iran
- Province: Zanjan
- County: Zanjan
- District: Zanjanrud
- Rural District: Chaypareh-ye Bala

Population (2016)
  - Total: 18
- Time zone: UTC+3:30 (IRST)

Azizlu (Persian: عزيزلو) (Note: Also romanized as ‘Azīzlū; also known as ‘Azīzlī) is a village in Chaypareh-ye Bala Rural District of Zanjanrud District in Zanjan County, Zanjan province, Iran.

== Demographics ==
=== Population ===
At the time of the 2006 National Census, the village's population was 25 in six households. The following census in 2011 counted 11 people in four households. The 2016 census measured the population of the village as 18 people in seven households.
