= Dandi, Iran =

City in Zanjan province, Iran

Dandi دندی
- City
- Location within Iran
- Coordinates: 36°33′12″N 47°37′15″E
- Country: Iran
- Province: Zanjan
- County: Mahneshan
- District: Anguran
- Established as a city: 1996

Population (2016)
  - Total: 4,778
- Time zone: UTC+3:30 (IRST)

Dandi (Persian: دندی) (Note: Also romanized as Dandī; also known as Dahandi and Dahdi) is a city in, and the capital of, Anguran District in Mahneshan County, Zanjan province, Iran. It also serves as the administrative center for Anguran Rural District. The village of Dandi was converted to a city in 1996.

== Demographics ==
=== Population ===
At the time of the 2006 National Census, the city's population was 2,547 in 658 households. The following census in 2011 counted 3,962 people in 1,018 households. The 2016 census measured the population of the city as 4,778 people in 1,313 households.
