= Behestan, Zanjan =

Village in Zanjan province, Iran

Behestan Persian: بهستان
- Village
- Location within Iran
- Coordinates: 36°40′06″N 47°43′36″E
- Country: Iran
- Province: Zanjan
- County: Mahneshan
- District: Central
- Rural District: Mah Neshan

Population (2016)
  - Total: 446
- Time zone: UTC+3:30 (IRST)

Behestan (Persian: بهستان) (Note: Also romanized as Behestān) is a village in Mah Neshan Rural District of the Central District in Mahneshan County, Zanjan province, Iran.

== Demographics ==
=== Population ===
At the time of the 2006 National Census, the village's population was 370 in 81 households. The following census in 2011 counted 390 people in 103 households. The 2016 census measured the population of the village as 446 people in 132 households.
