= Sari Aghol, East Azerbaijan =

Sari Aghol ساري اغل
- Village
- Location within Iran
- Coordinates: 36°57′35″N 46°55′57″E
- Country: Iran
- Province: East Azerbaijan
- County: Charuymaq
- Bakhsh: Central
- Rural District: Charuymaq-e Jonubegharbi

Population (2006)
  - Total: 78
- Time zone: UTC+3:30 (IRST)
  - Summer (DST): UTC+4:30 (IRDT)

Sari Aghol (Persian: ساري اغل, also Romanized as Sārī Āghol; also known as Sar Āghol and Sarāghol) is a village in Charuymaq-e Jonubegharbi Rural District, in the Central District of Charuymaq County, East Azerbaijan Province, Iran. At the 2006 census, its population was 78, in 12 families.
