= Guglar =

Village in Zanjan province, Iran

Guglar Persian: گوگلر
- Village
- Location within Iran
- Coordinates: 36°57′29″N 47°51′22″E
- Country: Iran
- Province: Zanjan
- County: Zanjan
- District: Zanjanrud
- Rural District: Chaypareh-ye Bala

Population (2016)
  - Total: 69
- Time zone: UTC+3:30 (IRST)

Guglar (Persian: گوگلر) (Note: Also romanized as Gūglar; formerly known as Gorglar; also known as Gūlar) is a village in Chaypareh-ye Bala Rural District of Zanjanrud District in Zanjan County, Zanjan province, Iran.

== Demographics ==
=== Population ===
At the time of the 2006 National Census, the village's population was 48 in nine households. The following census in 2011 counted 45 people in 10 households. The 2016 census measured the population of the village as 69 people in 15 households.
