= Serik, East Azerbaijan =

Serik سريك
- Village
- Location within Iran
- Coordinates: 37°04′52″N 47°06′22″E
- Country: Iran
- Province: East Azerbaijan
- County: Charuymaq
- Bakhsh: Central
- Rural District: Charuymaq-e Markazi

Population (2006)
  - Total: 63
- Time zone: UTC+3:30 (IRST)
  - Summer (DST): UTC+4:30 (IRDT)

Serik (Persian: سريك, also Romanized as Serīk) is a village in Charuymaq-e Markazi Rural District, in the Central District of Charuymaq County, East Azerbaijan Province, Iran. At the 2006 census, its population was 63, in 12 families.
