= Qezeljeh-ye Olya =

Village in Zanjan province, Iran

Qezeljeh-ye Olya Persian: قزلجه عليا
- Village
- Location within Iran
- Coordinates: 36°49′04″N 47°43′48″E
- Country: Iran
- Province: Zanjan
- County: Zanjan
- District: Zanjanrud
- Rural District: Ghanibeyglu

Population (2016)
  - Total: 198
- Time zone: UTC+3:30 (IRST)

Qezeljeh-ye Olya (Persian: قزلجه عليا) (Note: Also romanized as Qezeljeh-ye ‘Olyā) is a village in Ghanibeyglu Rural District of Zanjanrud District in Zanjan County, Zanjan province, Iran.

== Demographics ==
=== Population ===
At the time of the 2006 National Census, the village's population was 243 in 46 households. The following census in 2011 counted 242 people in 50 households. The 2016 census measured the population of the village as 198 people in 51 households.
