= Khezrabad, West Azerbaijan =

Khezrabad خضراباد
- Village
- Location within Iran
- Coordinates: 37°24′32″N 45°12′01″E
- Country: Iran
- Province: West Azerbaijan
- County: Urmia
- Bakhsh: Central
- Rural District: Torkaman

Population (2006)
  - Total: 201
- Time zone: UTC+3:30 (IRST)
  - Summer (DST): UTC+4:30 (IRDT)

Khezrabad (Persian: خضراباد, also Romanized as Kheẕrābād) is a village in Torkaman Rural District, in the Central District of Urmia County, West Azerbaijan Province, Iran. At the 2006 census, its population was 201, in 63 families.
