= Churuk-e Olya =

Village in Zanjan province, Iran

Churuk-e Olya Persian: چوروك عليا
- Village
- Location within Iran
- Coordinates: 37°04′49″N 47°53′06″E
- Country: Iran
- Province: Zanjan
- County: Zanjan
- District: Zanjanrud
- Rural District: Chaypareh-ye Bala

Population (2016)
  - Total: 234
- Time zone: UTC+3:30 (IRST)

Churuk-e Olya (Persian: چوروك عليا) (Note: Also romanized as Chūrūk-e 'Olyā; also known as Chorak, Churak, Chūrūk-e Bālā, and Chūzak-e 'Olyā) is a village in Chaypareh-ye Bala Rural District of Zanjanrud District in Zanjan County, Zanjan province, Iran.

== Demographics ==
=== Population ===
At the time of the 2006 National Census, the village's population was 293 in 63 households. The following census in 2011 counted 261 people in 63 households. The 2016 census measured the population of the village as 234 people in 60 households.
