= Qarah Buteh =

Village in Zanjan province, Iran

Qarah Buteh Persian: قره بوته
- Village
- Location within Iran
- Coordinates: 37°03′28″N 47°46′05″E
- Country: Iran
- Province: Zanjan
- County: Zanjan
- District: Zanjanrud
- Rural District: Chaypareh-ye Bala

Population (2026)
  - Total: 4,000
- Time zone: UTC+3:30 (IRST)

Qarah Buteh (Persian: قره بوطه) (Note: Also romanized as Qarah Būţeh and Qareh Būţeh) is a village in, and the capital of, Chaypareh-ye Bala Rural District in Zanjanrud District of Zanjan County, Zanjan province, Iran.

== Demographics ==
=== Population ===
At the time of the 2006 National Census, the village's population was 2,747 in 701 households. The following census in 2011 counted 2,691 people in 854 households. The 2016 census measured the population of the village as 2,594 people in 832 households. It was the most populous village in its rural district.
