= Gug Tappeh, Zanjan =

Village in Zanjan province, Iran

Gug Tappeh Persian: گوگ تپه
- Village
- Location within Iran
- Coordinates: 37°00′23″N 47°50′03″E
- Country: Iran
- Province: Zanjan
- County: Zanjan
- District: Zanjanrud
- Rural District: Chaypareh-ye Bala

Population (2016)
  - Total: 360
- Time zone: UTC+3:30 (IRST)

Gug Tappeh (Persian: گوگ تپه) (Note: Also romanized as Gūg Tappeh; also known as Gorg Tappeh) is a village in Chaypareh-ye Bala Rural District of Zanjanrud District in Zanjan County, Zanjan province, Iran.

== Demographics ==
=== Population ===
At the time of the 2006 National Census, the village's population was 413 in 84 households. The following census in 2011 counted 325 people in 74 households. The 2016 census measured the population of the village as 360 people in 96 households.
