= Chaypareh-ye Bala Rural District =

Rural district in Zanjan province, Iran

Chaypareh-ye Bala Rural District Persian: دهستان چايپاره بالا
- Rural District
- Location within Iran
- Coordinates: 37°02′N 47°48′E
- Country: Iran
- Province: Zanjan
- County: Zanjan
- District: Zanjanrud
- Established: 1987
- Capital: Qarah Buteh

Population (2016)
  - Total: 4,033
- Time zone: UTC+3:30 (IRST)

Chaypareh-ye Bala Rural District (Persian: دهستان چايپاره بالا) is in Zanjanrud District of Zanjan County, Zanjan province, Iran. Its capital is the village of Qarah Buteh.

== Demographics ==
=== Population ===
At the time of the 2006 National Census, the rural district's population was 4,379 in 1,065 households. There were 4,162 inhabitants in 1,210 households at the following census of 2011. The 2016 census measured the population of the rural district as 4,033 in 1,217 households. The most populous of its nine villages was Qarah Buteh, with 2,594 people.

=== Other villages in the rural district ===
- Aylan
- Azizlu
- Churuk-e Olya
- Gug Tappeh
- Guglar
- Qarah Owghlanlu
- Qeytul
