= Anguran District =

District in Zanjan province, Iran

Anguran District Persian: بخش انگوران
- District
- Location within Iran
- Coordinates: 36°32′N 47°37′E
- Country: Iran
- Province: Zanjan
- County: Mahneshan
- Established: 1989
- Capital: Dandi

Population (2016)
  - Total: 17,164
- Time zone: UTC+3:30 (IRST)

Anguran District (Persian: بخش انگوران) is in Mahneshan County, Zanjan province, Iran. Its capital is the city of Dandi.

The district was established in 1989 in Zanjan County and became part of Mahneshan County in 1996.

== History ==
Anguran District was established in Zanjan County in 1989, combining Qaleh Juq and Anguran Rural Districts, with the village of Dandi at its centre. Dandi was converted to a city in 1996. In October of the same year, the district became part of the newly established Mahneshan County.

== Geography ==
Anguran District and the adjoining part of Mahneshan County contain much of the northern, eastern and southern sections of the Angouran Protected Area and Wildlife Refuge, a mountainous area in southwestern Zanjan province. According to the provincial Department of Environment, the area has been protected since 1970, making it one of the oldest protected areas in Iran. It is one of the country's best habitats for the Armenian mouflon.

== Demographics ==
=== Population ===
At the time of the 2006 National Census, the district's population was 17,799 in 4,047 households. The following census in 2011 counted 17,290 people in 5,073 households. The 2016 census measured the population of the district as 17,164 inhabitants in 5,213 households.

=== Administrative divisions ===
Anguran District Population
| Administrative Divisions | 2006 | 2011 | 2016 |
|---|---|---|---|
| Anguran RD | 9,457 | 8,331 | 7,890 |
| Qaleh Juq RD | 5,795 | 4,997 | 4,496 |
| Dandi (city) | 2,547 | 3,962 | 4,778 |
| Total | 17,799 | 17,290 | 17,164 |
RD = Rural District

== Economy ==
The Angouran Mineral Processing Complex, which includes lead and zinc concentration units and a zinc plant, is in the Dandi area.
