= Central District (Mahneshan County) =

District in Zanjan province, Iran

Central District (Mahneshan County) Persian: بخش مرکزی شهرستان ماه‌نشان
- District
- Location within Iran
- Coordinates: 36°44′N 47°34′E
- Country: Iran
- Province: Zanjan
- County: Mahneshan
- Established: 1996
- Capital: Mah Neshan

Population (2016)
  - Total: 22,261
- Time zone: UTC+3:30 (IRST)

The Central District of Mahneshan County (Persian: بخش مرکزی شهرستان ماه‌نشان) is in Zanjan province, Iran. Its capital is the city of Mah Neshan.

== Demographics ==
=== Population ===
At the time of the 2006 National Census, the district's population was 23,424 in 5,307 households. The following census in 2011 counted 23,022 people in 5,942 households. The 2016 census measured the population of the district as 22,261 inhabitants in 6,722 households.

=== Administrative divisions ===
Central District (Mahneshan County) Population
Administrative Divisions	2006	2011	2016
Mah Neshan RD	10,168	9,866	9,604
Owryad RD	6,413	5,537	5,196
Qezel Gechilu RD	2,348	2,180	1,974
Mah Neshan (city)	4,495	5,439	5,487
Total	23,424	23,022	22,261
RD = Rural District
