= Mahneshan County =

County in Zanjan province, Iran

Mahneshan County Persian: شهرستان ماه‌نشان
- County
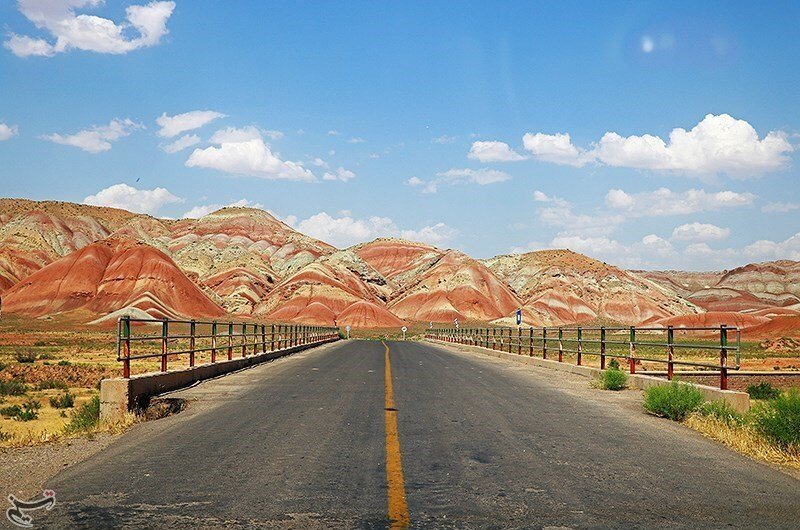
- Landscape in Mahneshan County

- Location of Mahneshan County in Zanjan province (left, yellow)

- Location of Zanjan province in Iran
- Coordinates: 36°39′N 47°36′E
- Country: Iran
- Province: Zanjan
- Established: 1996
- Capital: Mah Neshan
- Districts: Central, Anguran

Population (2016)
  - Total: 39,425
- Time zone: UTC+3:30 (IRST)

Mahneshan County (Persian: شهرستان ماه‌نشان) is in Zanjan province, Iran. Its capital is the city of Mah Neshan.

== Demographics ==
=== Population ===
At the time of the 2006 National Census, the county's population was 41,223 in 9,354 households. The following census in 2011 counted 40,312 people in 10,990 households. The 2016 census measured the population of the county as 39,425 in 11,935 households.

=== Administrative divisions ===
Mahneshan County's population history and administrative structure over three consecutive censuses are shown in the following table.

Mahneshan County Population
Administrative Divisions	2006	2011	2016
Central District	23,424	23,022	22,261
Mah Neshan RD	10,168	9,866	9,604
Owryad RD	6,413	5,537	5,196
Qezel Gechilu RD	2,348	2,180	1,974
Mah Neshan (city)	4,495	5,439	5,487
Anguran District	17,799	17,290	17,164
Anguran RD	9,457	8,331	7,890
Qaleh Juq RD	5,795	4,997	4,496
Dandi (city)	2,547	3,962	4,778
Total	41,223	40,312	39,425
RD = Rural District

== See also ==
Media related to Mahneshan County at Wikimedia Commons
