= Deh-e Shir =

Deh-e Shir or Deh Shir or Dehshir or Deh-i-Shir (Persian: ده شير), also rendered as Deshir, may refer to various places in Iran:

- Deh Shir, Kuhbanan, Kerman Province
- Deh Shir, Ravar, Kerman Province
- Deh Shir, Sirjan, Kerman Province
- Deh-e Shir, Khuzestan
- Deh-e Shir Khan
- Dehshir, Yazd
- Deh Shir, Zanjan
- Dehshir-e Olya, Zanjan Province
- Dehshir-e Sofla, Zanjan Province
- Dehshir Rural District, in Yazd Province
