= Abdal (disambiguation) =

Abdal is a rank of forty Sufi saints in Islamic metaphysics and mysticism.

Abdal may also refer to:

== Places ==
- Abdal, Azerbaijan, a village in the Agdam District of Azerbaijan
- Abdal, Punjab, a village in Amritsar Dist. of Indian state of Punjab
- Abdal, Gurdaspur, Punjab, a village in Gurdaspur Dist. of Indian state of Punjab
- Abdal, Iran, a village in Zanjan Province, Iran
- Abdal, Nebraska, a ghost town in the US

== Other uses ==
- Abdal (caste), a Muslim community found in North India
- Abdals (ethnic group in West Asia), an ethnic group in Turkey, Syria, and the Balkans
- Qara Shemsi Abdal (1828–1886), a 19th-century Ottoman poet
- Äynu people of Xinjiang region, China
- Äynu language, the language of the Äynu
- Hephthalites, sometimes referred to as Abdals

== See also ==
- Dervish, a Sufi ascetic
- Abdul, component of many names from Arabic
- Abdali (disambiguation)
