= Kaj Kolah =

Kaj Kolah (Persian: كج كلاه) may refer to:

- Kaj Kolah, Khuzestan, Iran
- Kaj Kolah, Zanjan, Iran

== See also ==
- Kaj (disambiguation)
- Kolah Kaj, Lorestan, Iran
