= Qezel Tappeh (disambiguation) =

Qezel Tappeh is a village in Kurdistan Province, Iran.

Qezel Tappeh (Persian: قزل تپه), also rendered as Qiziltepe, may also refer to:

- Qezel Tappeh-ye Ali Qoli, Zanjan Province
- Qezel Tappeh-ye Bayat, Zanjan Province
