= Gollijeh =

Gollijeh or Golijeh or Galijeh (Persian: گليجه) may refer to:

- Golijeh, Ardabil
- Golijeh, East Azerbaijan
- Galijeh, Isfahan
- Golijeh, West Azerbaijan
- Gollijeh, Zanjan
- Golijeh, Ijrud, Zanjan Province
- Gollijeh-ye Olya, Zanjan Province
- Gollijeh-ye Sofla, Zanjan Province
