= Barut Aghaji =

Barut Aghaji (Persian: باروت اغاجي), also rendered as Barut Aqaji, may refer to:

- Barut Aghaji, East Azerbaijan
- Barut Aghaji, Zanjan
