= Abdali =

Abdali may refer to:

- Durrani, one of the largest Pashtun tribes of Afghanistan and western Pakistan, alternately called ABDALI)
  - Ahmed Shah Durrani, also known as Ahmad Shah Abdali, founder of the Durrani Empire in Afghanistan
- Al-Abdali, a district in Amman, Jordan
- Abdali Mall, Amman, Jordan
- Abdali Project, in Al-Abdali
- Abdali Road, Multan, Pakistan
- Abdali Sultanate, also known as Lahej Sultanate, a historical state in the British Aden Protectorate and the Federation of South Arabia
- Abdali-I, a Pakistani short-range ballistic missile
- Sarah Mohanna Al Abdali (born 1989), Saudi Arabian artist
- Shaida Mohammad Abdali, Afghan ambassador to India
- Al Abdali, a region in Amman, Jordan
- Hasan Abdali, a village in Mojezat Rural District, Zanjan County, Zanjan Province, Iran
- Abdali, Al Jahra, a district in the Jahra Governorate of Kuwait

== See also ==
- Abdal_(disambiguation)
