= Papai =

Papai may refer to:

== Football clubs ==
- Pápai FC, defunct Hungarian football club
- Pápai PFC, Hungarian football club

== People ==
- Al Papai, baseball pitcher
- Emőke Pápai, Hungarian footballer
- Jim Papai, Canadian football player
- Joci Pápai, Hungarian singer

== Places ==
- Papai, Iran, a village
- Pápa District (Pápai járás), western Hungary
