= Jarchi =

Jarchi may refer to:

- Jarchi, a village in northern Iran
- The Jarchi Mosque in Ishafan, Iran
- The mediaeval French rabbi Rashi, also known as Jarchi
