= Taham =

Taham (Persian: تهام or تهم) may refer to:

- Taham, Gilan (تهام - Tahām)
- Taham, Zanjan (تهم - Taham)
- Taham Rural District, in Zanjan Province
