= Gollejeh =

Gollejeh or Goljeh or Golojeh (Persian: گلجه) may refer to:

- Goljeh, Ardabil
- Gollejeh, Abhar, Zanjan Province
- Goljeh, East Azerbaijan
- Golojeh, Zanjan
- Gollijeh (disambiguation)
