= Galeh Rud =

Village in Zanjan province, Iran

Galeh Rud Persian: گلهرود
- Village
- Location within Iran
- Coordinates: 36°48′55″N 48°30′14″E
- Country: Iran
- Province: Zanjan
- County: Zanjan
- District: Central
- Rural District: Taham

Population (2016)
  - Total: 149
- Time zone: UTC+3:30 (IRST)

Galeh Rud (Persian: گلهرود) (Note: Also romanized as Galeh Rūd and Golahrūd) is a village in Taham Rural District of the Central District in Zanjan County, Zanjan province, Iran.

== Demographics ==
=== Population ===
At the time of the 2006 National Census, the village's population was 199 in 51 households. The following census in 2011 counted 193 people in 51 households. The 2016 census measured the population of the village as 149 people in 49 households.
