= Chayerlu =

Village in Zanjan province, Iran

Chayerlu Persian: چايرلو
- Village
- Location within Iran
- Coordinates: 36°31′58″N 48°00′15″E
- Country: Iran
- Province: Zanjan
- County: Zanjan
- District: Central
- Rural District: Qoltuq

Population (2016)
  - Total: 544
- Time zone: UTC+3:30 (IRST)

Chayerlu (Persian: چايرلو) (Note: Also romanized as Chāy Yerlū and Chāyerlū; also known as Chehārlu) is a village in Qoltuq Rural District (Note: Formerly Saidabad Rural District) of the Central District in Zanjan County, Zanjan province, Iran.

== Demographics ==
=== Population ===
At the time of the 2006 National Census, the village's population was 742 in 152 households. The following census in 2011 counted 712 people in 182 households. The 2016 census measured the population of the village as 544 people in 184 households.
