= Baghlujeh-ye Bayat =

Village in Zanjan province, Iran

Baghlujeh-ye Bayat Persian: باغلوجه بيات
- Village
- Location within Iran
- Coordinates: 36°40′23″N 48°18′26″E
- Country: Iran
- Province: Zanjan
- County: Zanjan
- District: Central
- Rural District: Zanjanrud-e Bala

Population (2016)
  - Total: 112
- Time zone: UTC+3:30 (IRST)

Baghlujeh-ye Bayat (Persian: باغلوجه بيات) (Note: Also romanized as Bāghlūjeh Bayāt and Bāghlūjeh-ye Bayāt; also known as Bāghlūjeh, Bāghlūjeh-ye Mehtar, Bakildzhar, and Baqiljār) is a village in Zanjanrud-e Bala Rural District of the Central District in Zanjan County, Zanjan province, Iran.

== Demographics ==
=== Population ===
At the time of the 2006 National Census, the village's population was 89 in 22 households. The following census in 2011 counted 94 people in 24 households. The 2016 census measured the population of the village as 112 people in 37 households.
