= Gow Ali =

Village in Zanjan province, Iran

Gow Ali Persian: گوالی
- Village
- Location within Iran
- Coordinates: 36°30′48″N 48°36′13″E
- Country: Iran
- Province: Zanjan
- County: Zanjan
- District: Central
- Rural District: Bonab

Population (2016)
  - Total: 83
- Time zone: UTC+3:30 (IRST)

Gow Ali (Persian: گوالی) (Note: Also romanized as Gavaali, Gavālī, Gow Ālī, and Gūālī; also known as Gawatali) is a village in Bonab Rural District of the Central District in Zanjan County, Zanjan province, Iran.

== Demographics ==
=== Population ===
At the time of the 2006 National Census, the village's population was 117 in 31 households. The following census in 2011 counted 96 people in 25 households. The 2016 census measured the population of the village as 83 people in 26 households.
