= Majineh =

Village in Zanjan province, Iran

Majineh Persian: مجينه
- Village
- Location within Iran
- Coordinates: 36°38′44″N 48°15′22″E
- Country: Iran
- Province: Zanjan
- County: Zanjan
- District: Central
- Rural District: Zanjanrud-e Bala

Population (2016)
  - Total: 282
- Time zone: UTC+3:30 (IRST)

Majineh (Persian: مجينه) (Note: Also romanized as Majīneh; also known as Madzhainak and Majāinah) is a village in Zanjanrud-e Bala Rural District of the Central District in Zanjan County, Zanjan province, Iran.

== Demographics ==
=== Population ===
At the time of the 2006 National Census, the village's population was 366 in 88 households. The following census in 2011 counted 333 people in 89 households. The 2016 census measured the population of the village as 282 people in 90 households.
