= Nezamabad, Zanjan =

Village in Zanjan province, Iran

Nezamabad Persian: نظام اباد
- Village
- Location within Iran
- Coordinates: 36°43′06″N 48°21′53″E
- Country: Iran
- Province: Zanjan
- County: Zanjan
- District: Central
- Rural District: Zanjanrud-e Bala

Population (2016)
  - Total: 56
- Time zone: UTC+3:30 (IRST)

Nezamabad (Persian: نظام اباد) (Note: Also romanized as Nez̧āmābād; also known as Nazīmābād and Nizvimabad) is a village in Zanjanrud-e Bala Rural District of the Central District in Zanjan County, Zanjan province, Iran.

== Demographics ==
=== Population ===
At the time of the 2006 National Census, the village's population was 79 in 17 households. The following census in 2011 counted 63 people in 18 households. The 2016 census measured the population of the village as 56 people in 18 households.
