= Kordeh Nab =

Village in Zanjan province, Iran

Kordeh Nab Persian: كرده ناب
- Village
- Location within Iran
- Coordinates: 36°37′33″N 48°46′27″E
- Country: Iran
- Province: Zanjan
- County: Zanjan
- District: Central
- Rural District: Bonab

Population (2016)
  - Total: 63
- Time zone: UTC+3:30 (IRST)

Kordeh Nab (Persian: كرده ناب) (Note: Also romanized as Kordeh Nāb; also known as Gerdeh Nāb, Kardahnāb, Karkhina, Kordeh Nof Eskand, and Kordnāb) is a village in Bonab Rural District of the Central District in Zanjan County, Zanjan province, Iran.

== Demographics ==
=== Population ===
At the time of the 2006 National Census, the village's population was 68 in 17 households. The following census in 2011 counted 68 people in 21 households. The 2016 census measured the population of the village as 63 people in 22 households.
