= Qoltuq =

Village in Zanjan province, Iran

Qoltuq Persian: قلتوق
- Village
- Location within Iran
- Coordinates: 36°29′41″N 48°04′14″E
- Country: Iran
- Province: Zanjan
- County: Zanjan
- District: Central
- Rural District: Qoltuq

Population (2016)
  - Total: 986
- Time zone: UTC+3:30 (IRST)

Qoltuq (Persian: قلتوق) (Note: Also romanized as Qaltūq and Qoltūq; also known as Koltukh, Kultūkh, and Qotūq) is a village in, and the capital of, Qoltuq Rural District (Note: Formerly Saidabad Rural District) in the Central District of Zanjan County, Zanjan province, Iran.

== Demographics ==
=== Population ===
At the time of the 2006 National Census, the village's population was 1,287 in 323 households. The following census in 2011 counted 1,197 people in 374 households. The 2016 census measured the population of the village as 986 people in 333 households. It was the most populous village in its rural district.
