= Meisam Nassiri =

Iranian freestyle wrestler

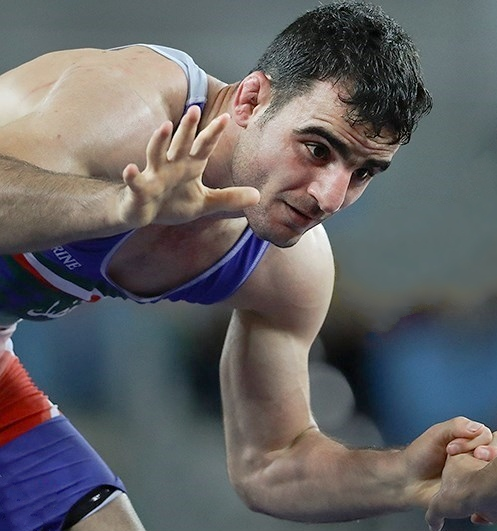
- Nasiri at the 2016 Olympics

Personal information
- Full name: Meisam Nasiri
- Nationality: Iranian
- Born: 1 June 1989 (age 37) Zanjan, Iran
- Height: 169 cm (5 ft 7 in)
- Weight: 65 kg (143 lb)

Sport
- Coached by: Rasoul Khadem
Medal record
Representing Iran
Asian Championships
Gold medal – first place	2016 Bangkok	65 kg
Bronze medal – third place	2017 New Delhi	65 kg
Islamic Solidarity Games
Gold medal – first place	2017 Baku	65 kg

Meisam Nassiri (Persian: میثم نصيری; born 1 June 1989) is an Iranian freestyle wrestler who won a gold medal at the 2016 Asian Wrestling Championships. He was born on 1 June 1989. He wrestled in the 65 kg weight category. He has competed in several World Wrestling Federation World Cups and won medals. He also competed in the 2016 Rio Olympics but lost in the first round. He also won a gold medal in the Islamic Games.

He is now a coach at the Meysam Nasiri Wrestling Academy in Zanjan.

== Wrestling career ==
He competed at the 2016 Olympics, but was eliminated in the first bout. In the Asian Championships 2017, he lost to Bajrang of India.

== Personal life ==
He was born in a village called Zarnan in Zanjan and still lives there.

Meysam Nassiri, even after joining the national team, did not forget his hometown and continues to work in agriculture and animal husbandry.

Meysam Nasiri established a horse riding club in Zarnan, named after him.
