= Kushkan, Zanjan =

Village in Zanjan province, Iran

Kushkan Persian: كوشكن
- Village
- Location within Iran
- Coordinates: 36°41′55″N 48°23′53″E
- Country: Iran
- Province: Zanjan
- County: Zanjan
- District: Central
- Rural District: Zanjanrud-e Bala

Population (2016)
  - Total: 647
- Time zone: UTC+3:30 (IRST)

Kushkan (Persian: كوشكن) (Note: Also romanized as Kowshkān, Kūshkan, and Kūshkān; also known as Kūshgān, Kushkana, Kushkand, and Kūshkīn) is a village in Zanjanrud-e Bala Rural District of the Central District in Zanjan County, Zanjan province, Iran.

== Demographics ==
=== Population ===
At the time of the 2006 National Census, the village's population was 445 in 109 households. The following census in 2011 counted 476 people in 118 households. The 2016 census measured the population of the village as 647 people in 135 households.
