= Yahyaabad, Zanjan =

Village in Zanjan province, Iran

Yahyaabad Persian: یحیی‌آباد
- Village
- Location within Iran
- Coordinates: 36°42′51″N 48°52′23″E
- Country: Iran
- Province: Zanjan
- County: Zanjan
- District: Central
- Rural District: Bonab

Population (2016)
  - Total: 141
- Time zone: UTC+3:30 (IRST)

Yahyaabad (Persian: یحیی‌آباد) (Note: Also romanized as Yaḩyáābād; also known as Yahiābād and Yakhiabad) is a village in Bonab Rural District of the Central District in Zanjan County, Zanjan province, Iran.

== Demographics ==
=== Population ===
At the time of the 2006 National Census, the village's population was 64 in 15 households. The following census in 2011 counted 60 people in 20 households. The 2016 census measured the population of the village as 38 people in 13 households.
