= Kavand, Zanjan =

Village in Zanjan province, Iran

Kavand Persian: كاوند
- Village
- Location within Iran
- Coordinates: 36°36′36″N 48°09′01″E
- Country: Iran
- Province: Zanjan
- County: Zanjan
- District: Central
- Rural District: Bughda Kandi

Population (2016)
  - Total: 628
- Time zone: UTC+3:30 (IRST)

Kavand (Persian: كاوند) (Note: Also romanized as Kāvand and Kāwand; also known as Kavyand) is a village in Bughda Kandi Rural District of the Central District in Zanjan County, Zanjan province, Iran.

== Demographics ==
=== Population ===
At the time of the 2006 National Census, the village's population was 1,095 in 287 households. The following census in 2011 counted 851 people in 283 households. The 2016 census measured the population of the village as 628 people in 211 households.
