= Hoseynabad, Zanjan =

Village in Zanjan province, Iran

Hoseynabad Persian: حسين اباد
- Village
- Location within Iran
- Coordinates: 36°36′51″N 48°07′16″E
- Country: Iran
- Province: Zanjan
- County: Zanjan
- District: Central
- Rural District: Bughda Kandi

Population (2016)
  - Total: 205
- Time zone: UTC+3:30 (IRST)

Hoseynabad (Persian: حسين اباد) (Note: Also romanized as Ḩoseynābād) is a village in Bughda Kandi Rural District of the Central District in Zanjan County, Zanjan province, Iran.

== Demographics ==
=== Population ===
At the time of the 2006 National Census, the village's population was 273 in 74 households. The following census in 2011 counted 257 people in 76 households. The 2016 census measured the population of the village as 205 people in 65 households.
