= Razbin =

Village in Zanjan province, Iran

Razbin Persian: رازبين
- Village
- Location within Iran
- Coordinates: 36°37′32″N 48°24′21″E
- Country: Iran
- Province: Zanjan
- County: Zanjan
- District: Central
- Rural District: Mojezat

Population (2016)
  - Total: 1,102
- Time zone: UTC+3:30 (IRST)

Razbin (Persian: رازبين) (Note: Also romanized as Rāzbīn; also known as Razian) is a village in Mojezat Rural District of the Central District in Zanjan County, Zanjan province, Iran.

== Demographics ==
=== Population ===
At the time of the 2006 National Census, the village's population was 1,076 in 226 households. The following census in 2011 counted 1,258 people in 331 households. The 2016 census measured the population of the village as 1,102 people in 361 households.
