= Golbolaghi =

Village in Zanjan province, Iran

Golbolaghi Persian: گل بلاغي
- Village
- Location within Iran
- Coordinates: 36°38′02″N 48°05′25″E
- Country: Iran
- Province: Zanjan
- County: Zanjan
- District: Central
- Rural District: Bughda Kandi

Population (2016)
  - Total: 409
- Time zone: UTC+3:30 (IRST)

Golbolaghi (Persian: گل بلاغي) (Note: Also romanized as Golbolāghī) is a village in Bughda Kandi Rural District of the Central District in Zanjan County, Zanjan province, Iran.

== Demographics ==
=== Population ===
At the time of the 2006 National Census, the village's population was 626 in 163 households. The following census in 2011 counted 619 people in 176 households. The 2016 census measured the population of the village as 409 people in 130 households.
