= Gol Bodagh =

Village in Zanjan province, Iran

Gol Bodagh Persian: گل بداغ
- Village
- Location within Iran
- Coordinates: 36°33′01″N 48°11′20″E
- Country: Iran
- Province: Zanjan
- County: Zanjan
- District: Central
- Rural District: Bughda Kandi

Population (2016)
  - Total: 97
- Time zone: UTC+3:30 (IRST)

Gol Bodagh (Persian: گل بداغ) (Note: Also romanized as Gol Bodāgh) is a village in Bughda Kandi Rural District of the Central District in Zanjan County, Zanjan province, Iran.

== Demographics ==
=== Population ===
At the time of the 2006 National Census, the village's population was 128 in 26 households. The following census in 2011 counted 129 people in 31 households. The 2016 census measured the population of the village as 77 people in 26 households.
