= Nimavar =

Village in Zanjan province, Iran

Nimavar Persian: نيماور
- Village
- Location within Iran
- Coordinates: 36°33′23″N 48°40′35″E
- Country: Iran
- Province: Zanjan
- County: Zanjan
- District: Central
- Rural District: Bonab

Population (2016)
  - Total: 1,160
- Time zone: UTC+3:30 (IRST)

Nimavar (Persian: نيماور) (Note: Also romanized as Nīmāvar; also known as Nemāvar) is a village in Bonab Rural District of the Central District in Zanjan County, Zanjan province, Iran.

== Demographics ==
=== Population ===
At the time of the 2006 National Census, the village's population was 1,089 in 315 households. The following census in 2011 counted 1,205 people in 370 households. The 2016 census measured the population of the village as 1,160 people in 396 households.
