= Lar, Zanjan =

Village in Zanjan province, Iran

Lar Persian: لار
- Village
- Location within Iran
- Coordinates: 36°45′02″N 48°52′31″E
- Country: Iran
- Province: Zanjan
- County: Zanjan
- District: Central
- Rural District: Bonab

Population (2016)
  - Total: 141
- Time zone: UTC+3:30 (IRST)

Lar (Persian: لار) (Note: Also romanized as Lār) is a village in Bonab Rural District of the Central District in Zanjan County, Zanjan province, Iran.

== Demographics ==
=== Population ===
At the time of the 2006 National Census, the village's population was 274 in 57 households. The following census in 2011 counted 229 people in 58 households. The 2016 census measured the population of the village as 141 people in 40 households.
