= Sheikh Jaber =

Sheikh Jaber may refer to:

- Sheikh Jaber I Al-Sabah (1770–1859), Emir of Kuwait
- Sheikh Jaber II Al-Sabah (1860–1917), Emir of Kuwait
- Sheikh Jaber Al Ahmad Al Jaber Al Sabah (1923–2006), Emir of Kuwait
- Sheykh Jaber, a village in Iran
