= Khatun Kandi =

Village in Zanjan province, Iran

Khatun Kandi Persian: خاتون كندي
- Village
- Location within Iran
- Coordinates: 36°30′09″N 48°09′21″E
- Country: Iran
- Province: Zanjan
- County: Zanjan
- District: Central
- Rural District: Qoltuq

Population (2016)
  - Total: 589
- Time zone: UTC+3:30 (IRST)

Khatun Kandi (Persian: خاتون كندي) (Note: Also romanized as Khātūn Kandī; also known as Khāt Kandi and Khatkendi) is a village in Qoltuq Rural District (Note: Formerly Saidabad Rural District) of the Central District in Zanjan County, Zanjan province, Iran.

== Demographics ==
=== Population ===
At the time of the 2006 National Census, the village's population was 821 in 202 households. The following census in 2011 counted 728 people in 226 households. The 2016 census measured the population of the village as 589 people in 234 households.
