= Jashn Sara =

Village in Zanjan province, Iran

Jashn Sara Persian: جشن سرا
- Village
- Location within Iran
- Coordinates: 36°36′26″N 48°12′40″E
- Country: Iran
- Province: Zanjan
- County: Zanjan
- District: Central
- Rural District: Bughda Kandi

Population (2016)
  - Total: 24
- Time zone: UTC+3:30 (IRST)

Jashn Sara (Persian: جشن سرا) (Note: Also romanized as Jashn Sarā; also known as Chachansaray, Chashmeh Sarāb, and Chashmeh-ye Sarāb) is a village in Bughda Kandi Rural District of the Central District in Zanjan County, Zanjan province, Iran.

== Demographics ==
=== Population ===
At the time of the 2006 National Census, the village's population was 92 in 21 households. The following census in 2011 counted 82 people in 20 households. The 2016 census measured the population of the village as 24 people in eight households.
