= Goljik =

Village in Zanjan province, Iran

Goljik Persian: گلجيك
- Village
- Location within Iran
- Coordinates: 36°40′58″N 48°05′43″E
- Country: Iran
- Province: Zanjan
- County: Zanjan
- District: Central
- Rural District: Zanjanrud-e Bala

Population (2016)
  - Total: 13
- Time zone: UTC+3:30 (IRST)

Goljik (Persian: گلجيك) (Note: Also romanized as Goljīk; also known as Guljak) is a village in Zanjanrud-e Bala Rural District of the Central District in Zanjan County, Zanjan province, Iran.

== Demographics ==
=== Population ===
At the time of the 2006 National Census, the village's population was 105 in 36 households. The following census in 2011 counted 32 people in 15 households. The 2016 census measured the population of the village as 13 people in six households.
