= Noqteh Bandi =

Village in Zanjan province, Iran

Noqteh Bandi Persian: نقطه بندي
- Village
- Location within Iran
- Coordinates: 36°36′56″N 48°34′17″E
- Country: Iran
- Province: Zanjan
- County: Zanjan
- District: Central
- Rural District: Bonab

Population (2016)
  - Total: 55
- Time zone: UTC+3:30 (IRST)

Noqteh Bandi (Persian: نقطه بندي) (Note: Also romanized as Noqţeh Bandī; also known as Nuktaband, and Nuqtāband) is a village in Bonab Rural District of the Central District in Zanjan County, Zanjan province, Iran.

== Demographics ==
=== Population ===
At the time of the 2006 National Census, the village's population was 102 in 22 households. The following census in 2011 counted 75 people in 18 households. The 2016 census measured the population of the village as 55 people in 21 households.
