= Amadegah-e Asli-ye Zanjan =

Village and training center in Zanjan province, Iran

Amadegah-e Asli-ye Zanjan Persian: آمادگاه اصلي زنجان
- Village and Training Center
- Location within Iran
- Coordinates: 36°43′02″N 48°22′18″E
- Country: Iran
- Province: Zanjan
- County: Zanjan
- District: Central
- Rural District: Zanjanrud-e Bala

Population (2016)
  - Total: 712
- Time zone: UTC+3:30 (IRST)

Amadegah-e Asli-ye Zanjan (Persian: آمادگاه اصلي زنجان) (Note: English: Zanjan Main Training Center; formerly known as Amadegah-e Meysam (امادگاه ميثم), also romanized as Amādegāh-e Meys̱am, English: Meysam Training Center) is a village and training center in Zanjanrud-e Bala Rural District of the Central District in Zanjan County, Zanjan province, Iran.

== Demographics ==
=== Population ===
At the time of the 2006 National Census, the village's population was 853 in 226 households. The following census in 2011 counted 1,048 people in 228 households. The 2016 census measured the population of the village as 712 people in 210 households.
