= Dizajabad =

Village in Zanjan province, Iran

Dizajabad Persian: ديزج اباد
- Village
- Location within Iran
- Coordinates: 36°37′44″N 48°35′42″E
- Country: Iran
- Province: Zanjan
- County: Zanjan
- District: Central
- Rural District: Bonab

Population (2016)
  - Total: 4,157
- Time zone: UTC+3:30 (IRST)

Dizajabad (Persian: ديزج اباد) (Note: Also romanized as Dīzajābād; also known as Dizag, Dīzaj Kharābeh, and Dīzeh Kharābeh) is a village in Bonab Rural District of the Central District in Zanjan County, Zanjan province, Iran.

== Demographics ==
=== Population ===
At the time of the 2006 National Census, the village's population was 3,688 in 927 households. The following census in 2011 counted 4,326 people in 1,286 households. The 2016 census measured the population of the village as 4,157 people in 1,294 households. It was the most populous village in its rural district.
