= Zangolabad =

Village in Zanjan province, Iran

Zangolabad Persian: زنگل اباد
- Village
- Location within Iran
- Coordinates: 36°34′54″N 48°26′40″E
- Country: Iran
- Province: Zanjan
- County: Zanjan
- District: Central
- Rural District: Mojezat

Population (2016)
  - Total: 124
- Time zone: UTC+3:30 (IRST)

Zangolabad (Persian: زنگل اباد) (Note: Also romanized as Zangalabad and Zangolābād; also known as Rangolābād) is a village in Mojezat Rural District of the Central District of Zanjan County, Zanjan province, Iran.

== Demographics ==
=== Population ===
At the time of the 2006 National Census, the village's population was 200 in 50 households. The following census in 2011 counted 168 people in 54 households. The 2016 census measured the population of the village as 124 people in 37 households.
