= Qareh Gowzlu, Zanjan =

Village in Zanjan province, Iran

Qareh Gowzlu Persian: قره گوزلو
- Village
- Location within Iran
- Coordinates: 36°28′15″N 48°02′34″E
- Country: Iran
- Province: Zanjan
- County: Zanjan
- District: Central
- Rural District: Qoltuq

Population (2016)
  - Total: 257
- Time zone: UTC+3:30 (IRST)

Qareh Gowzlu (Persian: قره گوزلو) (Note: Also romanized as Qareh Gowzlū; also known as Kharajuz, Qara Quzlu, Qarah Gozlū, and Qareh Gozlū) is a village in Qoltuq Rural District (Note: Formerly Saidabad Rural District) of the Central District in Zanjan County, Zanjan province, Iran.

== Demographics ==
=== Population ===
At the time of the 2006 National Census, the village's population was 445 in 110 households. The following census in 2011 counted 349 people in 105 households. The 2016 census measured the population of the village as 257 people in 97 households.
