= Chiyar, Zanjan =

Village in Zanjan province, Iran

Chiyar Persian: چير
- Village
- Location within Iran
- Coordinates: 36°43′34″N 48°18′28″E
- Country: Iran
- Province: Zanjan
- County: Zanjan
- District: Central
- Rural District: Zanjanrud-e Bala

Population (2016)
  - Total: 498
- Time zone: UTC+3:30 (IRST)

Chiyar (Persian: چير) (Note: Also romanized as Chīyar) is a village in Zanjanrud-e Bala Rural District of the Central District in Zanjan County, Zanjan province, Iran.

== Demographics ==
=== Population ===
At the time of the 2006 National Census, the village's population was 623 in 165 households. The following census in 2011 counted 550 people in 152 households. The 2016 census measured the population of the village as 498 people in 154 households.
