= Gugjeh Qeya =

Village in Zanjan province, Iran

Gugjeh Qeya Persian: گوگجه قيا
- Village
- Location within Iran
- Coordinates: 36°30′58″N 48°06′32″E
- Country: Iran
- Province: Zanjan
- County: Zanjan
- District: Central
- Rural District: Qoltuq

Population (2016)
  - Total: 734
- Time zone: UTC+3:30 (IRST)

Gugjeh Qeya (Persian: گوگجه قيا) (Note: Also romanized as Gowgjeh Qīā and Gūgjeh Qeyā; also known as Gholūcheh Qīā, Gogjeh Ghiya, Gowgcheh Qayeh, Gowgjeh Qayeh, Gucha-Kiya, Gūjeh Qayeh, Guoha Qiya, and Gūyjeh Qayah) is a village in Qoltuq Rural District (Note: Formerly Saidabad Rural District) of the Central District in Zanjan County, Zanjan province, Iran.

== Demographics ==
=== Population ===
At the time of the 2006 National Census, the village's population was 919 in 229 households. The following census in 2011 counted 867 people in 266 households. The 2016 census measured the population of the village as 734 people in 262 households.
