= Kanavand =

Village in Zanjan province, Iran

Kanavand Persian: كناوند
- Village
- Location within Iran
- Coordinates: 36°48′15″N 48°14′02″E
- Country: Iran
- Province: Zanjan
- County: Zanjan
- District: Central
- Rural District: Zanjanrud-e Bala

Population (2016)
  - Total: 488
- Time zone: UTC+3:30 (IRST)

Kanavand (Persian: كناوند) (Note: Also romanized as Kanāvand, Kanawand, Kanvand, and Kenāvand) is a village in Zanjanrud-e Bala Rural District of the Central District in Zanjan County, Zanjan province, Iran.

== Demographics ==
=== Population ===
At the time of the 2006 National Census, the village's population was 484 in 137 households. The following census in 2011 counted 528 people in 149 households. The 2016 census measured the population of the village as 488 people in 150 households.
