= Dizaj-e Bala =

Village in Zanjan province, Iran

Dizaj-e Bala Persian: ديزج بالا
- Village
- Location within Iran
- Coordinates: 36°35′57″N 48°26′42″E
- Country: Iran
- Province: Zanjan
- County: Zanjan
- District: Central
- Rural District: Mojezat

Population (2016)
  - Total: 367
- Time zone: UTC+3:30 (IRST)

Dizaj-e Bala (Persian: ديزج بالا) (Note: Also romanized as Dīzaj-e Bālā) is a village in Mojezat Rural District of the Central District of Zanjan County, Zanjan province, Iran.

== Demographics ==
=== Population ===
At the time of the 2006 National Census, the village's population was 569 in 166 households. The following census in 2011 counted 554 people in 174 households. The 2016 census measured the population of the village as 367 people in 121 households.
