= Shilandar =

Village in Zanjan province, Iran

Shilandar Persian: شيلاندر
- Village
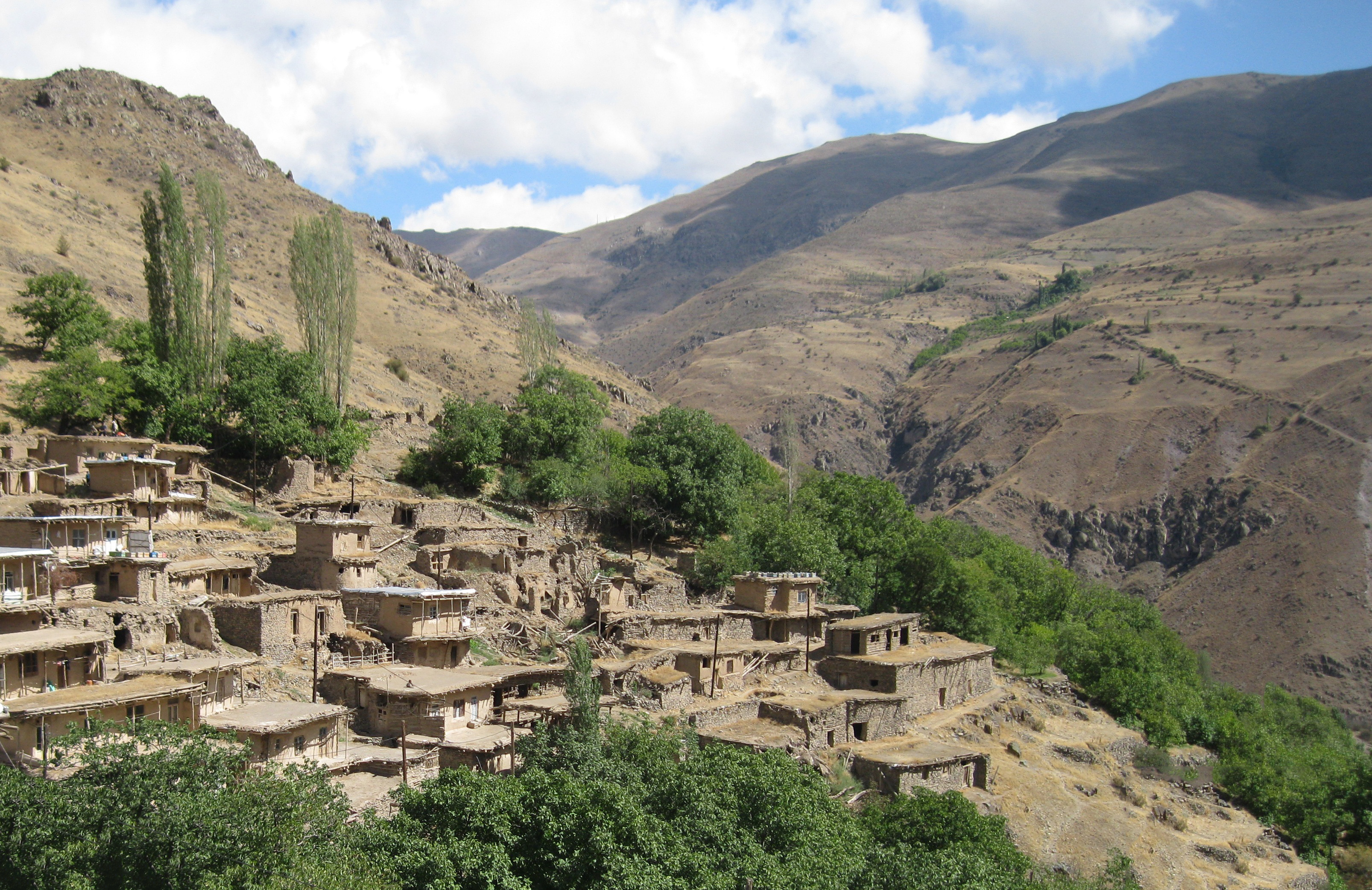
- The village of Shilandar

- Location within Iran
- Coordinates: 36°50′12″N 48°41′29″E
- Country: Iran
- Province: Zanjan
- County: Zanjan
- District: Central
- Rural District: Taham

Population (2016)
  - Total: 10
- Time zone: UTC+3:30 (IRST)

Shilandar (Persian: شيلاندر) (Note: Also romanized as Shīlāndar; also known as Chilandar, Shalāndar, and Shelandār) is a village in Taham Rural District of the Central District in Zanjan County, Zanjan province, Iran.

== Demographics ==
=== Population ===
At the time of the 2006 National Census, the village's population was 144 in 34 households. The population was below the reporting threshold at the following census in 2011. The 2016 census measured the population of the village as 10 people in five households.
