= Gowjeh Qia =

Village in Zanjan province, Iran

Gowjeh Qia Persian: گوجه قيا
- Village
- Location within Iran
- Coordinates: 36°36′35″N 48°18′06″E
- Country: Iran
- Province: Zanjan
- County: Zanjan
- District: Central
- Rural District: Mojezat

Population (2016)
  - Total: 333
- Time zone: UTC+3:30 (IRST)

Gowjeh Qia (Persian: گوجه قيا) (Note: Also romanized as Gaujeh Qiya, Gowjeh Qayā, Gowjeh Qīā, and Gowjeh Qīyā; also known as Gogjeh Ghiya, Gowgjaqayā, Gowgjeh Qayeh, Gowgjeh Qīeh, Gowjeh Qayeh, and Goyudzha-Kaya) is a village in Mojezat Rural District of the Central District in Zanjan County, Zanjan province, Iran.

== Demographics ==
=== Population ===
At the time of the 2006 National Census, the village's population was 544 in 125 households. The following census in 2011 counted 472 people in 126 households. The 2016 census measured the population of the village as 333 people in 104 households.
