= Tazehkand-e Ziaabad =

Village in Zanjan province, Iran

Tazehkand-e Ziaabad Persian: تازه كندضيااباد
- Village
- Location within Iran
- Coordinates: 36°40′57″N 48°11′49″E
- Country: Iran
- Province: Zanjan
- County: Zanjan
- District: Central
- Rural District: Zanjanrud-e Bala

Population (2016)
  - Total: 88
- Time zone: UTC+3:30 (IRST)

Tazehkand-e Ziaabad (Persian: تازه كندضيااباد) (Note: Also romanized as Tāzehkand-e Ẕīāābād; also known as Tāzehkand) is a village in Zanjanrud-e Bala Rural District of the Central District in Zanjan County, Zanjan province, Iran.

== Demographics ==
=== Population ===
At the time of the 2006 National Census, the village's population was 228 in 52 households. The following census in 2011 counted 157 people in 42 households. The 2016 census measured the population of the village as 88 people in 29 households.
