= Qaleh, Zanjan =

Village in Zanjan province, Iran

Qaleh Persian: قلعه
- Village
- Location within Iran
- Coordinates: 36°48′21″N 48°47′11″E
- Country: Iran
- Province: Zanjan
- County: Zanjan
- District: Central
- Rural District: Bonab

Population (2016)
  - Total: 160
- Time zone: UTC+3:30 (IRST)

Qaleh (Persian: قلعه) (Note: Also romanized as Qal‘eh; also known as Kalakh) is a village in Bonab Rural District of the Central District in Zanjan County, Zanjan province, Iran.

== Demographics ==
=== Population ===
At the time of the 2006 National Census, the village's population was 283 in 55 households. The following census in 2011 counted 223 people in 49 households. The 2016 census measured the population of the village as 160 people in 43 households.
