= Ramin, Zanjan =

Village in Zanjan province, Iran

Ramin Persian: رامين
- Village
- Location within Iran
- Coordinates: 36°33′26″N 48°33′21″E
- Country: Iran
- Province: Zanjan
- County: Zanjan
- District: Central
- Rural District: Mojezat

Population (2016)
  - Total: 734
- Time zone: UTC+3:30 (IRST)

Ramin (Persian: رامين) (Note: Also romanized as Rāmīn; also known as Dāmīn, Iraman, and Rahmīn) is a village in Mojezat Rural District of the Central District of Zanjan County, Zanjan province, Iran.

== Demographics ==
=== Population ===
At the time of the 2006 National Census, the village's population was 1,078 in 236 households. The following census in 2011 counted 846 people in 233 households. The 2016 census measured the population of the village as 734 people in 221 households.
