= Taherabad, Zanjan =

Village in Zanjan province, Iran

Taherabad Persian: طاهراباد
- Village
- Location within Iran
- Coordinates: 36°49′09″N 48°28′39″E
- Country: Iran
- Province: Zanjan
- County: Zanjan
- District: Central
- Rural District: Taham

Population (2016)
  - Total: 63
- Time zone: UTC+3:30 (IRST)

Taherabad (Persian: طاهراباد) (Note: Also romanized as Ţāherābād) is a village in Taham Rural District of the Central District in Zanjan County, Zanjan province, Iran.

== Demographics ==
=== Population ===
At the time of the 2006 National Census, the village's population was 83 in 26 households. The following census in 2011 counted 75 people in 25 households. The 2016 census measured the population of the village as 63 people in 21 households.
