= Bulamaji =

Bulamaji or Boolamaji (Persian: بولاماجي) may refer to:

- Bulamaji, Zanjan
- Bulamaji, Khodabandeh, Zanjan Province
