= Suram Ali =

Village in Zanjan province, Iran

Suram Ali Persian: سورمعلي
- Village
- Location within Iran
- Coordinates: 36°35′44″N 48°22′12″E
- Country: Iran
- Province: Zanjan
- County: Zanjan
- District: Central
- Rural District: Mojezat

Population (2016)
  - Total: 20
- Time zone: UTC+3:30 (IRST)

Suram Ali (Persian: سورمعلي) (Note: Also romanized as Sūram ʿAlī) is a village in Mojezat Rural District of the Central District of Zanjan County, Zanjan province, Iran.

== Demographics ==
=== Population ===
At the time of the 2006 National Census, the village's population was 48 in 13 households. The following census in 2011 counted 40 people in 11 households. The 2016 census measured the population of the village as 20 people in seven households.
