= Gul Tepe =

Gul Tepe (Rose mound) is a Turkish place name and it may refer to:

== Turkey ==
- Gültepe, Aksaray, a village in the central district of Aksaray Province
- Gültepe, Kağıthane a neighbourhood in İstanbul

== Iran ==
- Gultepe, Zanjan, Iran

== See also ==
- Gol Tappeh (disambiguation), places in Iran
- Kültəpə, Azerbaijan
- Kültepe, Turkey
