= Qinarjeh, Zanjan =

Village in Zanjan province, Iran

Qinarjeh Persian: قينرجه
- Village
- Location within Iran
- Coordinates: 36°30′17″N 48°31′53″E
- Country: Iran
- Province: Zanjan
- County: Zanjan
- District: Central
- Rural District: Mojezat

Population (2016)
  - Total: 235
- Time zone: UTC+3:30 (IRST)

Qinarjeh (Persian: قينرجه) (Note: Also romanized as Qīnarjeh; also known as Qīnarcheh and Qīzjeh) is a village in Mojezat Rural District of the Central District of Zanjan County, Zanjan province, Iran.

== Demographics ==
=== Population ===
At the time of the 2006 National Census, the village's population was 439 in 100 households. The following census in 2011 counted 337 people in 96 households. The 2016 census measured the population of the village as 235 people in 71 households.
