= Aliabad-e Sharqi =

Village in Zanjan province, Iran

Aliabad-e Sharqi Persian: علی‌آباد شرقی
- Village
- Location within Iran
- Coordinates: 36°43′29″N 48°29′59″E
- Country: Iran
- Province: Zanjan
- County: Zanjan
- District: Central
- Rural District: Bonab

Population (2016)
  - Total: 34
- Time zone: UTC+3:30 (IRST)

Aliabad-e Sharqi (Persian: علی‌آباد شرقی) (Note: Also romanized as ‘Alīābād-e Sharqī; also known as ‘Alīābād) is a village in Bonab Rural District of the Central District in Zanjan County, Zanjan province, Iran.

== Demographics ==
=== Population ===
At the time of the 2006 National Census, the village's population was 135 in 28 households. The following census in 2011 counted 61 people in 14 households. The 2016 census measured the population of the village as 34 people in nine households.
