= Hajji Bachcheh =

Village in Zanjan province, Iran

Hajji Bachcheh Persian: حاجي بچه
- Village
- Location within Iran
- Coordinates: 36°34′58″N 47°58′20″E
- Country: Iran
- Province: Zanjan
- County: Zanjan
- District: Central
- Rural District: Qoltuq

Population (2016)
  - Total: 15
- Time zone: UTC+3:30 (IRST)

Hajji Bachcheh (Persian: حاجي بچه) (Note: Also romanized as Ḩājī Bachcheh and Ḩājjī Bachcheh; also known as Hājibacheh) is a village in Qoltuq Rural District (Note: Formerly Saidabad Rural District) of the Central District in Zanjan County, Zanjan province, Iran.

== Demographics ==
=== Population ===
At the time of the 2006 National Census, the village's population was 136 in 31 households. The following census in 2011 counted 76 people in 25 households. The 2016 census measured the population of the village as 15 people in six households.
