= Reyhan, Zanjan =

Village in Zanjan province, Iran

Reyhan Persian: ريحان
- Village
- Location within Iran
- Coordinates: 36°32′28″N 48°23′38″E
- Country: Iran
- Province: Zanjan
- County: Zanjan
- District: Central
- Rural District: Mojezat

Population (2016)
  - Total: 160
- Time zone: UTC+3:30 (IRST)

Reyhan (Persian: ريحان) (Note: Also romanized as Reyḩān and Rihān; also known as Rikhan) is a village in Mojezat Rural District of the Central District of Zanjan County, Zanjan province, Iran.

== Demographics ==
=== Population ===
At the time of the 2006 National Census, the village's population was 167 in 40 households. The following census in 2011 counted 168 people in 47 households. The 2016 census measured the population of the village as 160 people in 46 households.
