= Chureh Nab =

Village in Zanjan province, Iran

Chureh Nab Persian: چوره ناب
- Village
- Location within Iran
- Coordinates: 36°41′48″N 48°35′35″E
- Country: Iran
- Province: Zanjan
- County: Zanjan
- District: Central
- Rural District: Bonab

Population (2016)
  - Total: 223
- Time zone: UTC+3:30 (IRST)

Chureh Nab (Persian: چوره ناب) (Note: Also romanized as Chooreh Nab, Chowreh Nāb, and Chūreh Nāb; also known as Charahnāb, Chirano, Chowrnāb, Chūreh Tāb, and Jūreh Nāb) is a village in Bonab Rural District of the Central District in Zanjan County, Zanjan province, Iran.

== Demographics ==
=== Population ===
At the time of the 2006 National Census, the village's population was 187 in 39 households. The following census in 2011 counted 210 people in 56 households. The 2016 census measured the population of the village as 223 people in 67 households.
