= Salmanlu =

Village in Zanjan province, Iran

Salmanlu Persian: سلمانلو
- Village
- Location within Iran
- Coordinates: 36°37′21″N 48°28′25″E
- Country: Iran
- Province: Zanjan
- County: Zanjan
- District: Central
- Rural District: Mojezat

Population (2016)
  - Total: 109
- Time zone: UTC+3:30 (IRST)

Salmanlu (Persian: سلمانلو) (Note: Also romanized as Salmānlū; also known as Salmālu, Salman, and Salmānū) is a village in Mojezat Rural District of the Central District of Zanjan County, Zanjan province, Iran.

== Demographics ==
=== Population ===
At the time of the 2006 National Census, the village's population was 105 in 26 households. The following census in 2011 counted 111 people in 29 households. The 2016 census measured the population of the village as 109 people in 27 households.
