= Quzleja =

Village in Zanjan province, Iran

Quzleja Persian: قوزلجا
- Village
- Location within Iran
- Coordinates: 36°49′11″N 48°45′54″E
- Country: Iran
- Province: Zanjan
- County: Zanjan
- District: Central
- Rural District: Bonab

Population (2016)
  - Total: 36
- Time zone: UTC+3:30 (IRST)

Quzleja (Persian: قوزلجا) (Note: Also romanized as Qowzlejā and Qūzlejā; also known as Kizludzha, Qizluja, and Yāqūzlejeh) is a village in Bonab Rural District of the Central District in Zanjan County, Zanjan province, Iran.

== Demographics ==
=== Population ===
At the time of the 2006 National Census, the village's population was 54 in 10 households. The following census in 2011 counted 39 people in eight households. The 2016 census measured the population of the village as 36 people in nine households.
