= Talkhab, Zanjan =

Village in Zanjan province, Iran

Talkhab Persian: تلخاب
- Village
- Location within Iran
- Coordinates: 36°36′19″N 48°06′21″E
- Country: Iran
- Province: Zanjan
- County: Zanjan
- District: Central
- Rural District: Bughda Kandi

Population (2016)
  - Total: 840
- Time zone: UTC+3:30 (IRST)

Talkhab (Persian: تلخاب) (Note: Also romanized as Talkhāb and Talkh Āb) is a village in Bughda Kandi Rural District of the Central District in Zanjan County, Zanjan province, Iran.

== Demographics ==
=== Population ===
At the time of the 2006 National Census, the village's population was 807 in 187 households. The following census in 2011 counted 911 people in 253 households. The 2016 census measured the population of the village as 840 people in 257 households.
