= Morvarid, Zanjan =

Village in Zanjan province, Iran

Morvarid Persian: مرواريد
- Village
- Location within Iran
- Coordinates: 36°36′44″N 48°47′40″E
- Country: Iran
- Province: Zanjan
- County: Zanjan
- District: Central
- Rural District: Bonab

Population (2016)
  - Total: 533
- Time zone: UTC+3:30 (IRST)

Morvarid (Persian: مرواريد) (Note: Also romanized as Morvārīd; also known as Mirvaray, Mīrwarai, and Morvārīyeh) is a village in Bonab Rural District of the Central District in Zanjan County, Zanjan province, Iran.

== Demographics ==
=== Population ===
At the time of the 2006 National Census, the village's population was 459 in 118 households. The following census in 2011 counted 550 people in 164 households. The 2016 census measured the population of the village as 533 people in 166 households.
