= Aqbolagh-e Howmeh =

Village in Zanjan province, Iran

Aqbolagh-e Howmeh Persian: اقبلاغ حومه
- Village
- Location within Iran
- Coordinates: 36°41′48″N 48°03′41″E
- Country: Iran
- Province: Zanjan
- County: Zanjan
- District: Central
- Rural District: Zanjanrud-e Bala

Population (2016)
  - Total: 439
- Time zone: UTC+3:30 (IRST)

Aqbolagh-e Howmeh (Persian: اقبلاغ حومه) (Note: Also romanized as Aqbolagh-e Humeh and Āqbolāgh-e Ḩūmeh; also known as Ak-Bulag, Āq Bolāgh, Āqbulāq, Āt Bolāgh, and Kharābeh Āghbolāgh) is a village in Zanjanrud-e Bala Rural District of the Central District in Zanjan County, Zanjan province, Iran.

== Demographics ==
=== Population ===
At the time of the 2006 National Census, the village's population was 718 in 159 households. The following census in 2011 counted 580 people in 175 households. The 2016 census measured the population of the village as 439 people in 148 households.
