= Golestaneh, Zanjan =

Village in Zanjan province, Iran

Golestaneh Persian: گلستانه
- Village
- Location within Iran
- Coordinates: 36°40′22″N 48°40′30″E
- Country: Iran
- Province: Zanjan
- County: Zanjan
- District: Central
- Rural District: Bonab

Population (2016)
  - Total: 34
- Time zone: UTC+3:30 (IRST)

Golestaneh (Persian: گلستانه) (Note: Also romanized as Golestāneh; also known as Golestān, Golestānābād, and Gulistanabad) is a village in Bonab Rural District of the Central District in Zanjan County, Zanjan province, Iran.

== Demographics ==
=== Population ===
At the time of the 2006 National Census, the village's population was 48 in 12 households. The following census in 2011 counted 47 people in 18 households. The 2016 census measured the population of the village as 34 people in 10 households.
