= Kaltekah =

Village in Zanjan province, Iran

Kaltekah Persian: كلتكه
- Village
- Location within Iran
- Coordinates: 36°34′34″N 47°57′18″E
- Country: Iran
- Province: Zanjan
- County: Zanjan
- District: Central
- Rural District: Qoltuq

Population (2016)
  - Total: Below reporting threshold
- Time zone: UTC+3:30 (IRST)

Kaltekah (Persian: كلتكه) is a village in Qoltuq Rural District (Note: Formerly Saidabad Rural District) of the Central District in Zanjan County, Zanjan province, Iran.

== Demographics ==
=== Population ===
At the time of the 2006 National Census, the village's population was 112 in 25 households. The following census in 2011 counted 46 people in 15 households. The 2016 census measured the population as below the reporting threshold.
