= Davran =

Village in Zanjan province, Iran

Davran Persian: دوران
- Village
- Location within Iran
- Coordinates: 36°34′27″N 48°23′11″E
- Country: Iran
- Province: Zanjan
- County: Zanjan
- District: Central
- Rural District: Mojezat

Population (2016)
  - Total: 176
- Time zone: UTC+3:30 (IRST)

Davran (Persian: دوران) (Note: Also romanized as Davrān, Dūrān, and Dūvarān; also known as Diran) is a village in Mojezat Rural District of the Central District of Zanjan County, Zanjan province, Iran.

== Demographics ==
=== Population ===
At the time of the 2006 National Census, the village's population was 258 in 51 households. The following census in 2011 counted 243 people in 56 households. The 2016 census measured the population of the village as 176 people in 52 households.
