= Sonqor, Zanjan =

Village in Zanjan province, Iran

Sonqor Persian: سنقر
- Village
- Location within Iran
- Coordinates: 36°33′40″N 48°11′56″E
- Country: Iran
- Province: Zanjan
- County: Zanjan
- District: Central
- Rural District: Bughda Kandi

Population (2016)
  - Total: 97
- Time zone: UTC+3:30 (IRST)

Sonqor (Persian: سنقر) (Note: Also romanized as Sanqor; also known as Sungur and Sūnqūr) is a village in Bughda Kandi Rural District of the Central District in Zanjan County, Zanjan province, Iran.

== Demographics ==
=== Population ===
At the time of the 2006 National Census, the village's population was 175 in 36 households. The following census in 2011 counted 140 people in 39 households. The 2016 census measured the population of the village as 97 people in 31 households.
