= Pain Kuh, Zanjan =

Village in Zanjan province, Iran

Pain Kuh Persian: پا ئين کوه
- Village
- Location within Iran
- Coordinates: 36°42′40″N 48°32′39″E
- Country: Iran
- Province: Zanjan
- County: Zanjan
- District: Central
- Rural District: Bonab

Population (2016)
  - Total: 1,466
- Time zone: UTC+3:30 (IRST)

Pain Kuh (Persian: پا ئين کوه) (Note: Also romanized as Pā’īn Kūh; also known as Palkin and Pegin) is a village in Bonab Rural District of the Central District in Zanjan County, Zanjan province, Iran.

== Demographics ==
=== Population ===
At the time of the 2006 National Census, the village's population was 597 in 141 households. The following census in 2011 counted 1,254 people in 327 households. The 2016 census measured the population of the village as 1,466 people in 420 households.
