= Zarna, Iran =

Zarna, Iran may refer to:

- Zarnan (disambiguation)
- Zarnaq
