= Azad-e Sofla =

Village in Zanjan province, Iran

Azad-e Sofla Persian: ازادسفلي
- Village
- Location within Iran
- Coordinates: 36°31′52″N 48°32′26″E
- Country: Iran
- Province: Zanjan
- County: Zanjan
- District: Central
- Rural District: Mojezat

Population (2016)
  - Total: 840
- Time zone: UTC+3:30 (IRST)

Azad-e Sofla (Persian: ازادسفلي) (Note: Also romanized as Āzād Soflā and Āzād-e Soflá; also known as Azadbar and Āzād-e Pā’īn) is a village in Mojezat Rural District of the Central District of Zanjan County, Zanjan province, Iran.

== Demographics ==
=== Population ===
At the time of the 2006 National Census, the village's population was 1,066 in 246 households. The following census in 2011 counted 1,085 people in 312 households. The 2016 census measured the population of the village as 840 people in 236 households.
