= Saqal Tuli =

Village in Zanjan province, Iran

Saqal Tuli Persian: سقل طولي
- Village
- Location within Iran
- Coordinates: 36°38′00″N 48°18′12″E
- Country: Iran
- Province: Zanjan
- County: Zanjan
- District: Central
- Rural District: Mojezat

Population (2016)
  - Total: 90
- Time zone: UTC+3:30 (IRST)

Saqal Tuli (Persian: سقل طولي) (Note: Also romanized as Saqal Tūlī and Saqqal Tūlī; also known as Saghltooli and Sakaltuli) is a village in Mojezat Rural District of the Central District of Zanjan County, Zanjan province, Iran.

== Demographics ==
=== Population ===
At the time of the 2006 National Census, the village's population was 122 in 30 households. The following census in 2011 counted 84 people in 29 households. The 2016 census measured the population of the village as 90 people in 27 households.
