= Homayun, Zanjan =

Village in Zanjan province, Iran

Homayun Persian: همايون
- Village
- Location within Iran
- Coordinates: 36°45′11″N 48°29′17″E
- Country: Iran
- Province: Zanjan
- County: Zanjan
- District: Central
- Rural District: Taham

Population (2016)
  - Total: 728
- Time zone: UTC+3:30 (IRST)

Homayun (Persian: همايون) (Note: Also romanized as Homāyūn) is a village in, and the capital of, Taham Rural District in the Central District of Zanjan County, Zanjan province, Iran.

== Demographics ==
=== Population ===
At the time of the 2006 National Census, the village's population was 794 in 197 households. The following census in 2011 counted 855 people in 245 households. The 2016 census measured the population of the village as 728 people in 224 households.
