= Quzlu, Zanjan =

Village in Zanjan province, Iran

Quzlu Persian: قوزلو
- Village
- Location within Iran
- Coordinates: 36°30′08″N 47°59′35″E
- Country: Iran
- Province: Zanjan
- County: Zanjan
- District: Central
- Rural District: Qoltuq

Population (2016)
  - Total: 177
- Time zone: UTC+3:30 (IRST)

Quzlu (Persian: قوزلو) (Note: Also romanized as Qūzlū) is a village in Qoltuq Rural District (Note: Formerly Saidabad Rural District) of the Central District in Zanjan County, Zanjan province, Iran.

== Demographics ==
=== Population ===
At the time of the 2006 National Census, the village's population was 430 in 100 households. The following census in 2011 counted 342 people in 101 households. The 2016 census measured the population of the village as 177 people in 71 households.
