= Sahlah =

Village in Zanjan province, Iran

Sahlah Persian: سهله
- Village
- Location within Iran
- Coordinates: 36°34′05″N 48°29′26″E
- Country: Iran
- Province: Zanjan
- County: Zanjan
- District: Central
- Rural District: Mojezat

Population (2016)
  - Total: 1,003
- Time zone: UTC+3:30 (IRST)

Sahlah (Persian: سهله) (Note: Also romanized as Sahleh; also known as Saglya and Sahila) is a village in Mojezat Rural District of the Central District of Zanjan County, Zanjan province, Iran.

== Demographics ==
=== Population ===
At the time of the 2006 National Census, the village's population was 917 in 213 households. The following census in 2011 counted 1,045 people in 272 households. The 2016 census measured the population of the village as 1,003 people in 289 households.
