= Morassa =

Village in Zanjan province, Iran

Morassa Persian: مرصع
- Village
- Location within Iran
- Coordinates: 36°36′27″N 48°01′25″E
- Country: Iran
- Province: Zanjan
- County: Zanjan
- District: Central
- Rural District: Bughda Kandi

Population (2016)
  - Total: 347
- Time zone: UTC+3:30 (IRST)

Morassa (Persian: مرصع) (Note: Also romanized as Moraşşa‘; also known as Murāseh and Muraza) is a village in Bughda Kandi Rural District of the Central District in Zanjan County, Zanjan province, Iran.

== Demographics ==
=== Population ===
At the time of the 2006 National Census, the village's population was 623 in 126 households. The following census in 2011 counted 521 people in 127 households. The 2016 census measured the population of the village as 347 people in 105 households.
