= Kalkash, Zanjan =

Village in Zanjan province, Iran

Kalkash Persian: كلكش
- Village
- Location within Iran
- Coordinates: 36°50′59″N 48°43′00″E
- Country: Iran
- Province: Zanjan
- County: Zanjan
- District: Central
- Rural District: Taham

Population (2016)
  - Total: 100
- Time zone: UTC+3:30 (IRST)

Kalkash (Persian: كلكش) is a village in Taham Rural District of the Central District in Zanjan County, Zanjan province, Iran.

== Demographics ==
=== Population ===
At the time of the 2006 National Census, the village's population was 194 in 38 households. The following census in 2011 counted 173 people in 41 households. The 2016 census measured the population of the village as 100 people in 23 households.
