= Binab, Zanjan =

Village in Zanjan province, Iran

Binab Persian: بيناب
- Village
- Location within Iran
- Coordinates: 36°34′58″N 48°40′44″E
- Country: Iran
- Province: Zanjan
- County: Zanjan
- District: Central
- Rural District: Bonab

Population (2016)
  - Total: 588
- Time zone: UTC+3:30 (IRST)

Binab (Persian: بيناب) (Note: Also romanized as Bīnāb; also known as Benāb, Binababad, Bonāb, and Bonyāb) is a village in, and the capital of, Bonab Rural District in the Central District of Zanjan County, Zanjan province, Iran.

== Demographics ==
=== Population ===
At the time of the 2006 National Census, the village's population was 604 in 172 households. The following census in 2011 counted 633 people in 184 households. The 2016 census measured the population of the village as 588 people in 178 households.
