= Hajji Ahmad =

Village in Zanjan province, Iran

Hajji Ahmad Persian: حاجي احمد
- Village
- Location within Iran
- Province: Zanjan
- County: Zanjan
- District: Central
- Rural District: Bonab

Population (2006)
  - Total: 24
- Time zone: UTC+3:30 (IRST)

Hajji Ahmad (Persian: حاجي احمد) (Note: Also romanized as Ḩājjī Aḩmad) is a village in Bonab Rural District of the Central District in Zanjan County, Zanjan province, Iran.

== Demographics ==
=== Population ===
At the time of the 2006 National Census, the village's population was 24 in 11 households. The village did not appear in the following censuses of 2011 and 2016.
