= Qarah Bulagh, Zanjan =

Village in Zanjan province, Iran

Qarah Bulagh Persian: قره بولاغ
- Village
- Location within Iran
- Coordinates: 36°40′26″N 48°08′21″E
- Country: Iran
- Province: Zanjan
- County: Zanjan
- District: Central
- Rural District: Zanjanrud-e Bala

Population (2016)
  - Total: 81
- Time zone: UTC+3:30 (IRST)

Qarah Bulagh (Persian: قره بولاغ) (Note: Also romanized as Qarah Būlāgh; also known as Kara-Bulag, Qarabulāq, Qarah Bolāgh, and Qareh Bolāgh) is a village in Zanjanrud-e Bala Rural District of the Central District in Zanjan County, Zanjan province, Iran.

== Demographics ==
=== Population ===
At the time of the 2006 National Census, the village's population was 176 in 37 households. The following census in 2011 counted 108 people in 29 households. The 2016 census measured the population of the village as 81 people in 29 households.
