= Aliabad-e Moini =

Village in Zanjan province, Iran

Aliabad-e Moini Persian: علي ابادمعيني
- Village
- Location within Iran
- Coordinates: 36°48′49″N 48°40′22″E
- Country: Iran
- Province: Zanjan
- County: Zanjan
- District: Central
- Rural District: Taham

Population (2016)
  - Total: 262
- Time zone: UTC+3:30 (IRST)

Aliabad-e Moini (Persian: علي ابادمعيني) (Note: Also romanized as ‘Alīābād-e Moeenī and ‘Alīābād-e Moʿīnī) is a village in Taham Rural District of the Central District in Zanjan County, Zanjan province, Iran.

== Demographics ==
=== Population ===
At the time of the 2006 National Census, the village's population was 12 in five households. The following censuses of 2011 and 2016 measured the population of the village as below the reporting threshold.
