= Hajji Kandi, Zanjan =

Village in Zanjan province, Iran

Hajji Kandi Persian: حاجي كندي
- Village
- Location within Iran
- Coordinates: 36°42′09″N 48°06′17″E
- Country: Iran
- Province: Zanjan
- County: Zanjan
- District: Central
- Rural District: Zanjanrud-e Bala

Population (2016)
  - Total: 68
- Time zone: UTC+3:30 (IRST)

Hajji Kandi (Persian: حاجي كندي) (Note: Also romanized as Ḩājī Kandī and Ḩājjī Kandī; also known as Khadzhi-Kendi) is a village in Zanjanrud-e Bala Rural District of the Central District in Zanjan County, Zanjan province, Iran.

== Demographics ==
=== Population ===
At the time of the 2006 National Census, the village's population was 122 in 34 households. The following census in 2011 counted 80 people in 24 households. The 2016 census measured the population of the village as 68 people in 23 households.
