= Eskand =

Village in Zanjan province, Iran

Eskand Persian: اسكند
- Village
- Location within Iran
- Coordinates: 36°37′24″N 48°45′43″E
- Country: Iran
- Province: Zanjan
- County: Zanjan
- District: Central
- Rural District: Bonab

Population (2016)
  - Total: 266
- Time zone: UTC+3:30 (IRST)

Eskand (Persian: اسكند) (Note: Also romanized as Askand) is a village in Bonab Rural District of the Central District in Zanjan County, Zanjan province, Iran.

== Demographics ==
=== Population ===
At the time of the 2006 National Census, the village's population was 294 in 59 households. The following census in 2011 counted 291 people in 76 households. The 2016 census measured the population of the village as 266 people in 81 households.
