= Said Kandi, Zanjan =

Village in Zanjan province, Iran

Said Kandi Persian: سعيدكندي
- Village
- Location within Iran
- Coordinates: 36°35′30″N 48°14′47″E
- Country: Iran
- Province: Zanjan
- County: Zanjan
- District: Central
- Rural District: Bughda Kandi

Population (2016)
  - Total: 203
- Time zone: UTC+3:30 (IRST)

Said Kandi (Persian: سعيدكندي) (Note: Also romanized as Sa‘īd Kandī; also known as Saiyid Kandi, Seytkendi, and Seyyed Kandī) is a village in Bughda Kandi Rural District of the Central District in Zanjan County, Zanjan province, Iran.

== Demographics ==
=== Population ===
At the time of the 2006 National Census, the village's population was 205 in 43 households. The following census in 2011 counted 202 people in 61 households. The 2016 census measured the population of the village as 203 people in 68 households.
