= Tarazuj =

Tarazuj or Tarazooj or Tarazowj or Tarazzuj (Persian: طرازوج) may refer to:

- Tarazuj, Ardabil
- Tarazuj, Zanjan
