= Chalian =

Chalian may refer to:

- Chalgan (Chālīān), a village in Iran
- Sergey Chalyan (born 1966), Republic of Armenia Military Commissar (2009-2012), major-general
- Yuri Chalyan (born 1933), colonel of the Armed Forces and Police of the Republic of Armenia
- David Chalian (born 1973), American political journalist
