= Kahnab, Zanjan =

Village in Zanjan province, Iran

Kahnab Persian: كهناب
- Village
- Location within Iran
- Coordinates: 36°38′34″N 48°40′20″E
- Country: Iran
- Province: Zanjan
- County: Zanjan
- District: Central
- Rural District: Bonab

Population (2016)
  - Total: 33
- Time zone: UTC+3:30 (IRST)

Kahnab (Persian: كهناب) (Note: Also romanized as Kahnāb; also known as Geyanī, Gīānū, Gīnū, Jīānū, and Kayno) is a village in Bonab Rural District of the Central District in Zanjan County, Zanjan province, Iran.

== Demographics ==
=== Population ===
At the time of the 2006 National Census, the village's population was 65 in 21 households. The following census in 2011 counted 50 people in 17 households. The 2016 census measured the population of the village as 33 people in 11 households.
