= Hajj Arash =

Village in Zanjan province, Iran

Hajj Arash Persian: حاج ارش
- Village
- Location within Iran
- Coordinates: 36°41′01″N 48°09′37″E
- Country: Iran
- Province: Zanjan
- County: Zanjan
- District: Central
- Rural District: Zanjanrud-e Bala

Population (2016)
  - Total: 321
- Time zone: UTC+3:30 (IRST)

Hajj Arash (Persian: حاج ارش) (Note: Also romanized as Ḩājj Arash; also known as Hājī Arash, Ḩājjī Ārash, Ḩājjī Arash, Ḩājjī Arsh, Hājrāsh, and Khadzhrash) is a village in Zanjanrud-e Bala Rural District of the Central District in Zanjan County, Zanjan province, Iran.

== Demographics ==
=== Population ===
At the time of the 2006 National Census, the village's population was 535 in 149 households. The following census in 2011 counted 438 people in 144 households. The 2016 census measured the population of the village as 321 people in 118 households.
