= Qaziabad, Zanjan =

Village in Zanjan province, Iran

Qaziabad Persian: قاضي اباد
- Village
- Location within Iran
- Coordinates: 36°31′55″N 48°26′59″E
- Country: Iran
- Province: Zanjan
- County: Zanjan
- District: Central
- Rural District: Mojezat

Population (2016)
  - Total: 53
- Time zone: UTC+3:30 (IRST)

Qaziabad (Persian: قاضي اباد) (Note: Also romanized as Qāẕīābād) is a village in Mojezat Rural District of the Central District of Zanjan County, Zanjan province, Iran.

== Demographics ==
=== Population ===
At the time of the 2006 National Census, the village's population was 70 in 19 households. The following census in 2011 counted 54 people in 13 households. The 2016 census measured the population of the village as 53 people in 14 households.
