= Bughda Kandi =

Village in Zanjan province, Iran

Bughda Kandi Persian: بوغداكندي
- Village
- Location within Iran
- Coordinates: 36°34′23″N 48°08′50″E
- Country: Iran
- Province: Zanjan
- County: Zanjan
- District: Central
- Rural District: Bughda Kandi

Population (2016)
  - Total: 1,086
- Time zone: UTC+3:30 (IRST)

Bughda Kandi (Persian: بوغداكندي) (Note: Also romanized as Būghdā Kandī; also known as Bugda-Kend and Bukda Kandi) is a village in, and the capital of, Bughda Kandi Rural District of the Central District of Zanjan County, Zanjan province, Iran.

== Demographics ==
=== Population ===
At the time of the 2006 National Census, the village's population was 1,036 in 258 households. The following census in 2011 counted 1,145 people in 328 households. The 2016 census measured the population of the village as 1,086 people in 346 households.
