= Aminabad, Zanjan =

Village in Zanjan province, Iran

Aminabad Persian: امين اباد
- Village
- Location within Iran
- Coordinates: 36°43′56″N 48°16′49″E
- Country: Iran
- Province: Zanjan
- County: Zanjan
- District: Central
- Rural District: Zanjanrud-e Bala

Population (2016)
  - Total: 1,121
- Time zone: UTC+3:30 (IRST)

Aminabad (Persian: امين اباد) (Note: Also romanized as Amīnābād) is a village in Zanjanrud-e Bala Rural District of the Central District in Zanjan County, Zanjan province, Iran.

== Demographics ==
=== Population ===
At the time of the 2006 National Census, the village's population was 1,101 in 259 households. The following census in 2011 counted 1,178 people in 333 households. The 2016 census measured the population of the village as 1,121 people in 348 households.
