= Esfajin =

Village in Zanjan province, Iran

Esfajin Persian: اسفجين
- Village
- Location within Iran
- Coordinates: 36°44′43″N 48°14′53″E
- Country: Iran
- Province: Zanjan
- County: Zanjan
- District: Central
- Rural District: Zanjanrud-e Bala

Population (2016)
  - Total: 927
- Time zone: UTC+3:30 (IRST)

Esfajin (Persian: اسفجين) (Note: Also romanized as Esfajīn and Esfejīn; also known as Isbadzhin and Isbājin) is a village in, and the capital of, Zanjanrud-e Bala Rural District in the Central District of Zanjan County, Zanjan province, Iran.

== Demographics ==
=== Population ===
At the time of the 2006 National Census, the village's population was 835 in 201 households. The following census in 2011 counted 1,026 people in 269 households. The 2016 census measured the population of the village as 927 people in 261 households.
