= Mehtar, Zanjan =

Village in Zanjan province, Iran

Mehtar Persian: مهتر
- Village
- Location within Iran
- Coordinates: 36°38′21″N 48°19′57″E
- Country: Iran
- Province: Zanjan
- County: Zanjan
- District: Central
- Rural District: Zanjanrud-e Bala

Population (2016)
  - Total: 125
- Time zone: UTC+3:30 (IRST)

Mehtar (Persian: مهتر) (Note: Also known as Mehmar and Metar) is a village in Zanjanrud-e Bala Rural District of the Central District in Zanjan County, Zanjan province, Iran.

== Demographics ==
=== Population ===
At the time of the 2006 National Census, the village's population was 246 in 67 households. The following census in 2011 counted 204 people in 56 households. The 2016 census measured the population of the village as 125 people in 38 households.
