= Yamchi, Zanjan =

Village in Zanjan province, Iran

Yamchi Persian: يامچي
- Village
- Location within Iran
- Coordinates: 36°46′43″N 48°12′54″E
- Country: Iran
- Province: Zanjan
- County: Zanjan
- District: Central
- Rural District: Zanjanrud-e Bala

Population (2016)
  - Total: 966
- Time zone: UTC+3:30 (IRST)

Yamchi (Persian: يامچي) (Note: Also romanized as Yāmchī; also known as Yāmcheh) is a village in Zanjanrud-e Bala Rural District of the Central District in Zanjan County, Zanjan province, Iran.

== Demographics ==
=== Population ===
At the time of the 2006 National Census, the village's population was 1,117 in 233 households. The following census in 2011 counted 1,185 people in 325 households. The 2016 census measured the population of the village as 966 people in 281 households.
