= Do Asb =

Village in Zanjan province, Iran

Do Asb Persian: دواسب
- Village
- Location within Iran
- Coordinates: 36°42′31″N 48°33′57″E
- Country: Iran
- Province: Zanjan
- County: Zanjan
- District: Central
- Rural District: Bonab

Population (2016)
  - Total: 2,726
- Time zone: UTC+3:30 (IRST)

Do Asb (Persian: دواسب) (Note: Also romanized as Dow Asb and Duasb; also known as Duvast) is a village in Bonab Rural District of the Central District in Zanjan County, Zanjan province, Iran.

== Demographics ==
=== Population ===
At the time of the 2006 National Census, the village's population was 708 in 154 households. The following census in 2011 counted 1,496 people in 396 households. The 2016 census measured the population of the village as 2,726 people in 774 households.
