= Qoli Kandi, Zanjan =

Village in Zanjan province, Iran

Qoli Kandi Persian: قلي كندي
- Village
- Location within Iran
- Coordinates: 36°36′51″N 48°16′19″E
- Country: Iran
- Province: Zanjan
- County: Zanjan
- District: Central
- Rural District: Mojezat

Population (2016)
  - Total: 146
- Time zone: UTC+3:30 (IRST)

Qoli Kandi (Persian: قلي كندي) (Note: Also romanized as Qolī Kandī; also known as Gulkandi) is a village in Mojezat Rural District of the Central District of Zanjan County, Zanjan province, Iran.

== Demographics ==
=== Population ===
At the time of the 2006 National Census, the village's population was 210 in 54 households. The following census in 2011 counted 185 people in 59 households. The 2016 census measured the population of the village as 146 people in 46 households.
