= Zaker, Zanjan =

Village in Zanjan province, Iran

Zaker Persian: ذاكر
- Village
- Location within Iran
- Coordinates: 36°38′45″N 48°43′08″E
- Country: Iran
- Province: Zanjan
- County: Zanjan
- District: Central
- Rural District: Bonab

Population (2016)
  - Total: 533
- Time zone: UTC+3:30 (IRST)

Zaker (Persian: ذاكر) (Note: Also romanized as Z̄āker; also known as Zakir) is a village in Bonab Rural District of the Central District in Zanjan County, Zanjan province, Iran.

== Demographics ==
=== Population ===
At the time of the 2006 National Census, the village's population was 556 in 122 households. The following census in 2011 counted 577 people in 170 households. The 2016 census measured the population of the village as 533 people in 174 households.
