= Chavarzaq, Zanjan =

Village in Zanjan province, Iran

Chavarzaq Persian: چورزق
- Village
- Location within Iran
- Coordinates: 36°36′05″N 48°20′00″E
- Country: Iran
- Province: Zanjan
- County: Zanjan
- District: Central
- Rural District: Mojezat

Population (2016)
  - Total: 1,262
- Time zone: UTC+3:30 (IRST)

Chavarzaq (Persian: چورزق; ) (Note: Also known as Chauriz and Chavarza) is a village in Mojezat Rural District of the Central District in Zanjan County, Zanjan province, Iran.

== Demographics ==
=== Population ===
At the time of the 2006 National Census, the village's population was 1,538 in 363 households. The following census in 2011 counted 1,574 people in 429 households. The 2016 census measured the population of the village as 1,262 people in 378 households.
