= Aqcheh Pireh =

Village in Zanjan province, Iran

Aqcheh Pireh Persian: اقچه پيره
- Village
- Location within Iran
- Coordinates: 36°38′22″N 48°22′27″E
- Country: Iran
- Province: Zanjan
- County: Zanjan
- District: Central
- Rural District: Mojezat

Population (2016)
  - Total: 63
- Time zone: UTC+3:30 (IRST)

Aqcheh Pireh (Persian: اقچه پيره) (Note: Also romanized as Āqcheh Pīreh; also known as Aghājapra and Āqjeh Pīreh) is a village in Mojezat Rural District of the Central District of Zanjan County, Zanjan province, Iran.

== Demographics ==
=== Population ===
At the time of the 2006 National Census, the village's population was 99 in 22 households. The following census in 2011 counted 68 people in 19 households. The 2016 census measured the population of the village as 63 people in 18 households.
