= Azhdahatu =

Village in Zanjan province, Iran

Azhdahatu Persian: اژدهاتو
- Village
- Location within Iran
- Coordinates: 36°36′07″N 48°24′33″E
- Country: Iran
- Province: Zanjan
- County: Zanjan
- District: Central
- Rural District: Mojezat

Population (2016)
  - Total: 1,276
- Time zone: UTC+3:30 (IRST)

Azhdahatu (Persian: اژدهاتو) (Note: Also romanized as Azhdahātū and Azhdehātū; also known as Adzhdikhatu, Āzdehsū, and Azhdasu) is a village in, and the capital of, Mojezat Rural District in the Central District of Zanjan County, Zanjan province, Iran.

== Demographics ==
=== Population ===
At the time of the 2006 National Census, the village's population was 1,276 in 364 households. The following census in 2011 counted 1,407 people in 453 households. The 2016 census measured the population of the village as 1,276 people in 421 households. It was the most populous village in its rural district.
