= Mollalar, Zanjan =

Village in Zanjan province, Iran

Mollalar Persian: ملالر
- Village
- Location within Iran
- Coordinates: 36°42′01″N 48°13′39″E
- Country: Iran
- Province: Zanjan
- County: Zanjan
- District: Central
- Rural District: Zanjanrud-e Bala

Population (2016)
  - Total: 459
- Time zone: UTC+3:30 (IRST)

Mollalar (Persian: ملالر) (Note: Also romanized as Mollālar; also known as Mullāhlar and Mullekhlar) is a village in Zanjanrud-e Bala Rural District of the Central District in Zanjan County, Zanjan province, Iran.

== Demographics ==
=== Population ===
At the time of the 2006 National Census, the village's population was 736 in 138 households. The following census in 2011 counted 649 people in 160 households. The 2016 census measured the population of the village as 459 people in 136 households.
