= Bayendar =

Village in Zanjan province, Iran

Bayendar Persian: بايندر
- Village
- Location within Iran
- Coordinates: 36°32′33″N 48°24′52″E
- Country: Iran
- Province: Zanjan
- County: Zanjan
- District: Central
- Rural District: Mojezat

Population (2016)
  - Total: 0
- Time zone: UTC+3:30 (IRST)

Bayendar (Persian: بايندر) (Note: Also romanized as Bāyendar and Bāyandor; also known as Rayindar) is a village in Mojezat Rural District of the Central District of Zanjan County, Zanjan province, Iran.

== Demographics ==
=== Population ===
At the time of the 2006 National Census, the village's population was 25 in seven households. The village did not appear in the following census of 2011. The 2016 census measured the population of the village as zero.
