= Dash Kasan, Zanjan =

Village in Zanjan province, Iran

Dash Kasan Persian: داش کسن
- Village
- Location within Iran
- Coordinates: 36°42′48″N 48°12′32″E
- Country: Iran
- Province: Zanjan
- County: Zanjan
- District: Central
- Rural District: Zanjanrud-e Bala

Population (2016)
  - Total: 102
- Time zone: UTC+3:30 (IRST)

Dash Kasan (Persian: داش کسن) (Note: Also romanized as Dāsh Kasan) is a village in Zanjanrud-e Bala Rural District of the Central District in Zanjan County, Zanjan province, Iran.

== Demographics ==
=== Population ===
At the time of the 2006 National Census, the village's population was 208 in 49 households. The following census in 2011 counted 156 people in 46 households. The 2016 census measured the population of the village as 102 people in 36 households.
