= Pambeh Juq =

Village in Zanjan province, Iran

Pambeh Juq Persian: پنبه جوق
- Village
- Location within Iran
- Coordinates: 36°38′33″N 48°26′57″E
- Country: Iran
- Province: Zanjan
- County: Zanjan
- District: Central
- Rural District: Mojezat

Population (2016)
  - Total: 273
- Time zone: UTC+3:30 (IRST)

Pambeh Juq (Persian: پنبه جوق) (Note: Also romanized as Pāmbeh Jūq; also known as Pābūqlujā, Pāmbeh Jūqeh, Pāmbū Qolūjā, Panbeh Jūqeh, Panbukilcha, and Panbuqulcha) is a village in Mojezat Rural District of the Central District of Zanjan County, Zanjan province, Iran.

== Demographics ==
=== Population ===
At the time of the 2006 National Census, the village's population was 242 in 58 households. The following census in 2011 counted 297 people in 80 households. The 2016 census measured the population of the village as 273 people in 79 households.
