= Sulichay =

Village in Zanjan province, Iran

Sulichay Persian: سولي چاي
- Village
- Location within Iran
- Coordinates: 36°43′49″N 48°47′19″E
- Country: Iran
- Province: Zanjan
- County: Zanjan
- District: Central
- Rural District: Bonab

Population (2016)
  - Total: 73
- Time zone: UTC+3:30 (IRST)

Sulichay (Persian: سولي چاي) (Note: Also romanized as Sūlīchāy; formerly known as Khan Chay (خان چای)) is a village in Bonab Rural District of the Central District in Zanjan County, Zanjan province, Iran.

== Demographics ==
=== Population ===
At the time of the 2006 National Census, the village's population was 107 in 26 households. The following census in 2011 counted 81 people in 24 households. The 2016 census measured the population of the village as 73 people in 25 households.
