= Ebrahimabad, Zanjan =

Village in Zanjan province, Iran

Ebrahimabad Persian: ابراهيم اباد
- Village
- Location within Iran
- Coordinates: 36°50′33″N 48°44′15″E
- Country: Iran
- Province: Zanjan
- County: Zanjan
- District: Central
- Rural District: Bonab

Population (2016)
  - Total: 150
- Time zone: UTC+3:30 (IRST)

Ebrahimabad (Persian: ابراهيم اباد) (Note: Also romanized as Ebrāhīmābād; also known as Abramabad, Ibrāhīmābād, and Ibrakhimabad) is a village in Bonab Rural District of the Central District in Zanjan County, Zanjan province, Iran.

== Demographics ==
=== Population ===
At the time of the 2006 National Census, the village's population was 166 in 34 households. The following census in 2011 counted 161 people in 40 households. The 2016 census measured the population of the village as 150 people in 35 households.
