= Badamestan, Zanjan =

Village in Zanjan province, Iran

Badamestan Persian: بادامستان
- Village
- Location within Iran
- Coordinates: 36°45′15″N 48°49′51″E
- Country: Iran
- Province: Zanjan
- County: Zanjan
- District: Central
- Rural District: Bonab

Population (2016)
  - Total: 43
- Time zone: UTC+3:30 (IRST)

Badamestan (Persian: بادامستان) (Note: Also romanized as Bādāmestān; also known as Badamistan) is a village in Bonab Rural District of the Central District in Zanjan County, Zanjan province, Iran.

== Demographics ==
=== Population ===
At the time of the 2006 National Census, the village's population was 97 in 21 households. The following census in 2011 counted 97 people in 23 households. The 2016 census measured the population of the village as 43 people in 10 households.
