= Qarah Tappeh, Zanjan =

Village in Zanjan province, Iran

Qarah Tappeh Persian: قره‌تپه
- Village
- Location within Iran
- Coordinates: 36°35′20″N 48°31′04″E
- Country: Iran
- Province: Zanjan
- County: Zanjan
- District: Central
- Rural District: Mojezat

Population (2016)
  - Total: 304
- Time zone: UTC+3:30 (IRST)

Qarah Tappeh (Persian: قره‌تپه) (Note: Also romanized as Qareh Tappeh; also known as Kara-Tappekh and Qaratepe) is a village in Mojezat Rural District of the Central District of Zanjan County, Zanjan province, Iran.

== Demographics ==
=== Population ===
At the time of the 2006 National Census, the village's population was 359 in 94 households. The following census in 2011 counted 347 people in 101 households. The 2016 census measured the population of the village as 104 people in 89 households.
