= Emam, Zanjan =

Village in Zanjan province, Iran

Emam Persian: امام
- Village
- Location within Iran
- Coordinates: 36°42′08″N 48°48′25″E
- Country: Iran
- Province: Zanjan
- County: Zanjan
- District: Central
- Rural District: Bonab

Population (2016)
  - Total: 433
- Time zone: UTC+3:30 (IRST)

Emam (Persian: امام) (Note: Also romanized as Emām and Imam; also known as Quzlu) is a village in Bonab Rural District of the Central District in Zanjan County, Zanjan province, Iran. Emam is a member of the villages of the Tarom region.

== Demographics ==
=== Population ===
At the time of the 2006 National Census, the village's population was 525 in 101 households. The following census in 2011 counted 467 people in 116 households. The 2016 census measured the population of the village as 433 people in 131 households.
