= Azad-e Olya =

Village in Zanjan province, Iran

Azad-e Olya Persian: ازادعليا
- Village
- Location within Iran
- Coordinates: 36°31′37″N 48°30′41″E
- Country: Iran
- Province: Zanjan
- County: Zanjan
- District: Central
- Rural District: Mojezat

Population (2016)
  - Total: 377
- Time zone: UTC+3:30 (IRST)

Azad-e-Olya (Persian: ازادعليا) (Note: Also romanized as Āzād-e-‘Olyā; also known as Azad, Āzād-e Bālā, and Āzadhar) is a village in Mojezat Rural District of the Central District of Zanjan County, Zanjan province, Iran.

== Demographics ==
=== Population ===
At the time of the 2006 National Census, the village's population was 432 in 92 households. The following census in 2011 counted 414 people in 118 households. The 2016 census measured the population of the village as 377 people in 112 households.
