= Mohsenabad, Zanjan =

Village in Zanjan province, Iran

Mohsenabad Persian: محسن اباد
- Village
- Location within Iran
- Coordinates: 36°40′35″N 48°15′29″E
- Country: Iran
- Province: Zanjan
- County: Zanjan
- District: Central
- Rural District: Zanjanrud-e Bala

Population (2016)
  - Total: 103
- Time zone: UTC+3:30 (IRST)

Mohsenabad (Persian: محسن اباد) (Note: Also romanized as Moḩsenābād) is a village in Zanjanrud-e Bala Rural District of the Central District in Zanjan County, Zanjan province, Iran.

== Demographics ==
=== Population ===
At the time of the 2006 National Census, the village's population was 233 in 71 households. The following census in 2011 counted 198 people in 54 households. The 2016 census measured the population of the village as 103 people in 32 households.
