= Mojezat Rural District =

Rural district in Zanjan province, Iran

Mojezat Rural District Persian: دهستان معجزات
- Rural District
- Location within Iran
- Coordinates: 36°34′N 48°26′E
- Country: Iran
- Province: Zanjan
- County: Zanjan
- District: Central
- Established: 1991
- Capital: Azhdahatu

Population (2016)
  - Total: 10,195
- Time zone: UTC+3:30 (IRST)

Mojezat Rural District (Persian: دهستان معجزات) is in the Central District of Zanjan County, Zanjan province, Iran. Its capital is the village of Azhdahatu.

== Demographics ==
=== Population ===
At the time of the 2006 National Census, the rural district's population was 12,448 in 3,000 households. There were 12,247 inhabitants in 3,464 households at the following census of 2011. The 2016 census measured the population of the rural district as 10,195 in 3,119 households. The most populous of its 30 villages was Azhdahatu, with 1,276 people.

=== Other villages in the rural district ===
- Aqcheh Pireh
- Azad-e Olya
- Azad-e Sofla
- Barut Aghaji
- Bayendar
- Chavarzaq
- Davran
- Dizaj-e Bala
- Gowjeh Qia
- Hasan Abdali
- Pambeh Juq
- Papai
- Qarah Tappeh
- Qaziabad
- Qinarjeh
- Qoli Kandi
- Ramin
- Razbin
- Reyhan
- Ruy Industrial Town
- Sahlah
- Salmanlu
- Saqal Tuli
- Suram Ali
- Zangolabad
