= Sheykh Jaber =

Village in Zanjan province, Iran

Sheykh Jaber Persian: شيخ جابر
- Village
- Location within Iran
- Coordinates: 36°32′23″N 47°59′29″E
- Country: Iran
- Province: Zanjan
- County: Zanjan
- District: Central
- Rural District: Qoltuq

Population (2016)
  - Total: 178
- Time zone: UTC+3:30 (IRST)

Sheykh Jaber (Persian: شيخ جابر) (Note: Also romanized as Sheykh Jāber) is a village in Qoltuq Rural District (Note: Formerly Saidabad Rural District) of the Central District in Zanjan County, Zanjan province, Iran.

== Demographics ==
=== Population ===
At the time of the 2006 National Census, the village's population was 311 in 67 households. The following census in 2011 counted 272 people in 70 households. The 2016 census measured the population of the village as 178 people in 63 households.
