= Chalgan =

Village in Zanjan province, Iran

Chalgan Persian: چلگان
- Village
- Location within Iran
- Coordinates: 36°47′05″N 48°39′46″E
- Country: Iran
- Province: Zanjan
- County: Zanjan
- District: Central
- Rural District: Taham

Population (2016)
  - Total: 262
- Time zone: UTC+3:30 (IRST)

Chalgan (Persian: چلگان) (Note: Also romanized as Chalegān and Chalgān; also known as Chālekān, Chālīān, and Chalpan) is a village in Taham Rural District of the Central District in Zanjan County, Zanjan province, Iran.

== Demographics ==
=== Population ===
At the time of the 2006 National Census, the village's population was 413 people in 86 households. The following census in 2011 counted 354 people in 88 households. The 2016 census measured the population of the village as 262 people in 76 households.
