= Gollijeh-ye Sofla =

Village in Zanjan province, Iran

Gollijeh-ye Sofla Persian: گلیجه سفلی
- Village
- Location within Iran
- Coordinates: 36°45′55″N 48°40′44″E
- Country: Iran
- Province: Zanjan
- County: Zanjan
- District: Central
- Rural District: Bonab

Population (2016)
  - Total: 187
- Time zone: UTC+3:30 (IRST)

Gollijeh-ye Sofla (Persian: گلیجه سفلی) (Note: Also romanized as Gollījeh-ye Soflá; also known as Goljeh, Gollījeh, Gulūjab, Gyul’dzya, and Kolūcheh) is a village in Bonab Rural District of the Central District in Zanjan County, Zanjan province, Iran.

== Demographics ==
=== Population ===
At the time of the 2006 National Census, the village's population was 280 in 57 households. The following census in 2011 counted 205 people in 59 households. The 2016 census measured the population of the village as 187 people in 52 households.
