= Bughda Kandi Rural District =

Rural district in Zanjan province, Iran

Bughda Kandi Rural District Persian: دهستان بوغداكندی
- Rural District
- Location within Iran
- Coordinates: 36°36′N 48°09′E
- Country: Iran
- Province: Zanjan
- County: Zanjan
- District: Central
- Established: 1987
- Capital: Bughda Kandi

Population (2016)
  - Total: 7,133
- Time zone: UTC+3:30 (IRST)

Bughda Kandi Rural District (Persian: دهستان بوغداكندی) is in the Central District of Zanjan County, Zanjan province, Iran. Its capital is the village of Bughda Kandi.

== Demographics ==
=== Population ===
At the time of the 2006 National Census, the rural district's population was 8,586 in 2,031 households. There were 8,442 inhabitants in 2,356 households at the following census of 2011. The 2016 census measured the population of the rural district as 7,133 in 2,227 households. The most populous of its 14 villages was Aq Kand, with 1,646 people.

=== Other villages in the rural district ===
- Dehshir-e Olya
- Gol Bodagh
- Gol Tappeh
- Golbolaghi
- Gollijeh
- Hoseynabad
- Jashn Sara
- Kavand
- Morassa
- Said Kandi
- Sonqor
- Talkhab
