= Papai, Iran =

Village in Zanjan province, Iran

Papai Persian: پاپائي
- Village
- Location within Iran
- Coordinates: 36°32′09″N 48°21′46″E
- Country: Iran
- Province: Zanjan
- County: Zanjan
- District: Central
- Rural District: Mojezat

Population (2016)
  - Total: 486
- Time zone: UTC+3:30 (IRST)

Papai (Persian: پاپائي) (Note: Also romanized as Pāpā’ī; also known as Papan) is a village in Mojezat Rural District of the Central District in Zanjan County, Zanjan province, Iran.

== Demographics ==
=== Population ===
At the time of the 2006 National Census, the village's population was 724 in 189 households. The following census in 2011 counted 634 people in 185 households. The 2016 census measured the population of the village as 486 people in 159 households.
