= Ebdal =

Village in Zanjan province, Iran

Ebdal Persian: ابدال
- Village
- Location within Iran
- Coordinates: 36°41′08″N 48°07′04″E
- Country: Iran
- Province: Zanjan
- County: Zanjan
- District: Central
- Rural District: Zanjanrud-e Bala

Population (2016)
  - Total: Below reporting threshold
- Time zone: UTC+3:30 (IRST)

Ebdal (Persian: ابدال) (Note: Also romanized as Abdāl and Ebdāl) is a village in Zanjanrud-e Bala Rural District of the Central District in Zanjan County, Zanjan province, Iran.

== Demographics ==
=== Population ===
At the time of the 2006 National Census, the village's population was 43 in eight households. The population in the following censuses of 2011 and 2016 was below the reporting threshold.
