= Bulamaji, Bonab =

Village in Zanjan province, Iran

Bulamaji Persian: بولاماجی
- Village
- Location within Iran
- Coordinates: 36°33′43″N 48°37′40″E
- Country: Iran
- Province: Zanjan
- County: Zanjan
- District: Central
- Rural District: Bonab

Population (2016)
  - Total: 300
- Time zone: UTC+3:30 (IRST)

Bulamaji (Persian: بولاماجی) (Note: Also romanized as Būlāmājī; also known as Balā Mājī, Bolāmājī, Bulamachi, and Būlāmājeh) is a village in Bonab Rural District of the Central District in Zanjan County, Zanjan province, Iran.

== Demographics ==
=== Population ===
At the time of the 2006 National Census, the village's population was 421 in 109 households. The following census in 2011 counted 387 people in 105 households. The 2016 census measured the population of the village as 300 people in 98 households.
