= Hasan Abdali =

Village in Zanjan province, Iran

Hasan Abdali Persian: حسن ابدالی
- Village
- Location within Iran
- Coordinates: 36°37′23″N 48°32′12″E
- Country: Iran
- Province: Zanjan
- County: Zanjan
- District: Central
- Rural District: Mojezat

Population (2016)
  - Total: 323
- Time zone: UTC+3:30 (IRST)

Hasan Abdali (Persian: حسن ابدالی) (Note: Also romanized as Ḩasan Abdālī; also known as Ḩasan ‘Abdāl, Hasanabdāl, and Khasanabdal) is a village in Mojezat Rural District of the Central District of Zanjan County, Zanjan province, Iran.

== Demographics ==
=== Population ===
At the time of the 2006 National Census, the village's population was 276 in 71 households. The following census in 2011 counted 300 people in 91 households. The 2016 census measured the population of the village as 323 people in 102 households.
