= Dehshir-e Olya =

Village in Zanjan province, Iran

Dehshir-e Olya Persian: ده شير عليا
- Village
- Location within Iran
- Coordinates: 36°34′00″N 48°05′03″E
- Country: Iran
- Province: Zanjan
- County: Zanjan
- District: Central
- Rural District: Bughda Kandi

Population (2016)
  - Total: 636
- Time zone: UTC+3:30 (IRST)

Dehshir-e Olya (Persian: ده شير عليا) (Note: Also romanized as Dehshīr-e ‘Olyā; also known as Ardh-i-Shīr, Deh Shīr-e Bālā, Deh-e Shīr-e Bālā, Dehshīr, Deshīr Bālā, Deshīr-e Bālā, Deshīr-e ‘Olyā, and Deyshir) is a village in Bughda Kandi Rural District of the Central District in Zanjan County, Zanjan province, Iran.

== Demographics ==
=== Population ===
At the time of the 2006 National Census, the village's population was 797 in 182 households. The following census in 2011 counted 782 people in 204 households. The 2016 census measured the population of the village as 636 people in 211 households.
