= Tarazuj, Zanjan =

Village in Zanjan province, Iran

Tarazuj Persian: طرازوج
- Village
- Location within Iran
- Coordinates: 36°48′11″N 48°45′34″E
- Country: Iran
- Province: Zanjan
- County: Zanjan
- District: Central
- Rural District: Bonab

Population (2016)
  - Total: 67
- Time zone: UTC+3:30 (IRST)

Tarazuj (Persian: طرازوج) (Note: Also romanized as Tarazooj, Ţarāzowj, Ţarāzūj, and Ţarāzzūj; also known as Marāzūj, Tazarvadzh, Tazarvaj, and Tāzarwaj) is a village in Bonab Rural District of the Central District in Zanjan County, Zanjan province, Iran.

== Demographics ==
=== Population ===
At the time of the 2006 National Census, the village's population was 140 in 25 households. The following census in 2011 counted 109 people in 26 households. The 2016 census measured the population of the village as 67 people in 18 households.
