= Qoltuq Rural District =

Rural district in Zanjan province, Iran

Qoltuq Rural District Persian: دهستان قلتوق
- Rural District
- Location within Iran
- Coordinates: 36°32′N 48°04′E
- Country: Iran
- Province: Zanjan
- County: Zanjan
- District: Central
- Established: 1987
- Capital: Qoltuq

Population (2016)
  - Total: 3,530
- Time zone: UTC+3:30 (IRST)

Qoltuq Rural District (Persian: دهستان قلتوق) (Note: Formerly Saidabad Rural District (دهستان سعيداباد)) is in the Central District of Zanjan County, Zanjan province, Iran. Its capital is the village of Qoltuq.

== Demographics ==
=== Population ===
At the time of the 2006 National Census, the rural district's population was 5,284 in 1,259 households. There were 4,632 inhabitants in 1,376 households at the following census of 2011. The 2016 census measured the population of the rural district as 3,530 in 1,269 households. The most populous of its 11 villages was Qoltuq, with 986 people.

=== Other villages in the rural district ===
- Chayerlu
- Dehshir-e Sofla
- Gugjeh Qeya
- Hajji Bachcheh
- Kaltekah
- Khatun Kandi
- Qareh Gowzlu
- Quzlu
- Sheykh Jaber
