= Taham, Zanjan =

Village in Zanjan province, Iran

Taham Persian: تهم
- Village
- Location within Iran
- Coordinates: 36°47′28″N 48°34′06″E
- Country: Iran
- Province: Zanjan
- County: Zanjan
- District: Central
- Rural District: Taham

Population (2016)
  - Total: 1,073
- Time zone: UTC+3:30 (IRST)

Taham (Persian: تهم) (Note: Also known as Tagam) is a village in Taham Rural District of the Central District in Zanjan County, Zanjan province, Iran.

== Demographics ==
=== Population ===
At the time of the 2006 National Census, the village's population was 1,075 in 279 households. The following census in 2011 counted 1,214 people in 318 households. The 2016 census measured the population of the village as 1,073 people in 348 households. It was the most populous village in its rural district.
