= Gol Tappeh, Zanjan =

Village in Zanjan province, Iran

Gol Tappeh Persian: گل تپه
- Village
- Location within Iran
- Coordinates: 36°35′10″N 48°06′30″E
- Country: Iran
- Province: Zanjan
- County: Zanjan
- District: Central
- Rural District: Bughda Kandi

Population (2016)
  - Total: 872
- Time zone: UTC+3:30 (IRST)

Gol Tappeh (Persian: گل تپه) (Note: Also known as Gul Tepe) is a village in Bughda Kandi Rural District of the Central District in Zanjan County, Zanjan province, Iran.

== Demographics ==
=== Population ===
At the time of the 2006 National Census, the village's population was 857 in 191 households. The following census in 2011 counted 891 people in 246 households. The 2016 census measured the population of the village as 872 people in 269 households.
