= Zanjanrud-e Bala Rural District =

Rural district in Zanjan province, Iran

Zanjanrud-e Bala Rural District Persian: دهستان زنجانرود بالا
- Rural District
- Location within Iran
- Coordinates: 36°43′N 48°12′E
- Country: Iran
- Province: Zanjan
- County: Zanjan
- District: Central
- Established: 1987
- Capital: Esfajin

Population (2016)
  - Total: 13,572
- Time zone: UTC+3:30 (IRST)

Zanjanrud-e Bala Rural District (Persian: دهستان زنجانرود بالا) is in the Central District of Zanjan County, Zanjan province, Iran. Its capital is the village of Esfajin.

== Demographics ==
=== Population ===
At the time of the 2006 National Census, the rural district's population was 11,912 in 2,922 households. There were 13,532 inhabitants in 3,139 households at the following census of 2011. The 2016 census measured the population of the rural district as 13,572 in 2,951 households. The most populous of its 31 villages was the University of Zanjan, with 3,881 people.

=== Other villages in the rural district ===
- Aminabad
- Amadegah-e Asli-ye Zanjan
- Aqbolagh-e Howmeh
- Baghlujeh-ye Bayat
- Chiyar
- Dash Kasan
- Ebdal
- Goljik
- Hajj Arash
- Hajji Kandi
- Kanavand
- Kushkan
- Majineh
- Mehtar
- Mohsenabad
- Mollalar
- Nezamabad
- Qarah Bulagh
- Qezel Tappeh-ye Ali Qoli
- Qezel Tappeh-ye Bayat
- Tazehkand-e Ziaabad
- Vala Rud
- Yamchi
- Yengijeh
