= Zarnan =

Zarnan (Persian: زرنان) may refer to:

- Zarnan, Lorestan
- Zarnan, Tehran
- Zarnan, Zanjan
