= Qezel Tappeh-ye Bayat =

Village in Zanjan province, Iran

Qezel Tappeh-ye Bayat Persian: قزل تپه بيات
- Village
- Location within Iran
- Coordinates: 36°43′29″N 48°08′18″E
- Country: Iran
- Province: Zanjan
- County: Zanjan
- District: Central
- Rural District: Zanjanrud-e Bala

Population (2016)
  - Total: 198
- Time zone: UTC+3:30 (IRST)

Qezel Tappeh-ye Bayat (Persian: قزل تپه بيات) (Note: Also romanized as Qezel Tappeh Bayāt and Qezel Tappeh-ye Bayāt) is a village in Zanjanrud-e Bala Rural District of the Central District in Zanjan County, Zanjan province, Iran.

== Demographics ==
=== Population ===
At the time of the 2006 National Census, the village's population was 299 in 67 households. The following census in 2011 counted 217 people in 60 households. The 2016 census measured the population of the village as 198 people in 60 households.
