= Bonab Rural District (Zanjan County) =

Rural district in Zanjan province, Iran

Bonab Rural District Persian: دهستان بناب
- Rural District
- Location within Iran
- Coordinates: 36°41′N 48°39′E
- Country: Iran
- Province: Zanjan
- County: Zanjan
- District: Central
- Established: 1987
- Capital: Binab

Population (2016)
  - Total: 14,146
- Time zone: UTC+3:30 (IRST)

Bonab Rural District (Persian: دهستان بناب) is in the Central District of Zanjan County, Zanjan province, Iran. Its capital is the village of Binab.

== Demographics ==
=== Population ===
At the time of the 2006 National Census, the rural district's population was 11,782 in 2,846 households. There were 13,665 inhabitants in 3,847 households at the following census of 2011. The 2016 census measured the population of the rural district as 14,146 in 4,299 households. The most populous of its 45 villages was Dizajabad, with 4,157 people.

=== Other villages in the rural district ===
- Aliabad-e Sharqi
- Ardin
- Badamestan
- Bulamaji
- Chureh Nab
- Do Asb
- Ebrahimabad
- Emam
- Eskand
- Golestaneh
- Gollijeh-ye Olya
- Gollijeh-ye Sofla
- Gow Ali
- Hajji Ahmad
- Jarchi
- Kahnab
- Kaj Kolah
- Kordeh Nab
- Lar
- Morvarid
- Nimavar
- Noqteh Bandi
- Pain Kuh
- Qaleh
- Quzleja
- Sulichay
- Tarazuj
- Yahyaabad
- Zaker
- Zarnan
