= Jarchi, Iran =

Village in Zanjan province, Iran

Jarchi Persian: جارچي
- Village
- Location within Iran
- Coordinates: 36°43′59″N 48°30′14″E
- Country: Iran
- Province: Zanjan
- County: Zanjan
- District: Central
- Rural District: Bonab

Population (2016)
  - Total: 20
- Time zone: UTC+3:30 (IRST)

Jarchi (Persian: جارچي) (Note: Also romanized as Jārchī) is a village in Bonab Rural District of the Central District in Zanjan County, Zanjan province, Iran.

== Demographics ==
=== Population ===
At the time of the 2006 National Census, the village's population was 39 in seven households. The following census in 2011 counted 38 people in 10 households. The 2016 census measured the population of the village as 20 people in seven households.
