= Dehshir-e Sofla =

Village in Zanjan province, Iran

Dehshir-e Sofla Persian: ده شير سفلي
- Village
- Location within Iran
- Coordinates: 36°32′31″N 48°05′06″E
- Country: Iran
- Province: Zanjan
- County: Zanjan
- District: Central
- Rural District: Qoltuq

Population (2016)
  - Total: 44
- Time zone: UTC+3:30 (IRST)

Deh-e Shir-e Sofla (Persian: ده شير سفلي) (Note: Also romanized as Deh Shīr-e Soflá and Deh-e Shīr-e Soflá; also known as Ardh-i-Shīr, Deh Shīr-e Pā’īn, Dehshīr, Deshīr Pā’īn, Deshīr Soflā, Dehshīr-e Soflá, and Karagez) is a village in Qoltuq Rural District (Note: Formerly Saidabad Rural District) of the Central District in Zanjan County, Zanjan province, Iran.

== Demographics ==
=== Population ===
At the time of the 2006 National Census, the village's population was 81 in 20 households. The following census in 2011 counted 43 people in 12 households. The 2016 census measured the population of the village as 44 people in 17 households.
