= Gollijeh, Zanjan =

Village in Zanjan province, Iran

Gollijeh Persian: گليجه
- Village
- Location within Iran
- Coordinates: 36°35′10″N 48°10′38″E
- Country: Iran
- Province: Zanjan
- County: Zanjan
- District: Central
- Rural District: Bughda Kandi

Population (2016)
  - Total: 63
- Time zone: UTC+3:30 (IRST)

Gollijeh (Persian: گليجه) (Note: Also romanized as Gollījeh) is a village in Bughda Kandi Rural District of the Central District in Zanjan County, Zanjan province, Iran.

== Demographics ==
=== Population ===
At the time of the 2006 National Census, the village's population was 178 in 37 households. The following census in 2011 counted 127 people in 29 households. The 2016 census measured the population of the village as 63 people in 20 households.
