= Qezel Tappeh-ye Ali Qoli =

Village in Zanjan province, Iran

Qezel Tappeh Persian: قزل تپه عليقلي
- Village
- Location within Iran
- Country: Iran
- Province: Zanjan
- County: Zanjan
- District: Central
- Rural District: Zanjanrud-e Bala

Population (2016)
  - Total: 374
- Time zone: UTC+3:30 (IRST)

Qezel Tappeh-ye Ali Qoli (Persian: قزل تپه عليقلي) (Note: Also romanized as Qezel Tappeh Alī Qolī and Qezel Tappeh-ye ‘Alī Qolī; also known as Kyzyltappekh, Qezel Tappeh, and Qiziltepe) is a village in Zanjanrud-e Bala Rural District of the Central District in Zanjan County, Zanjan province, Iran.

== Demographics ==
=== Population ===
At the time of the 2006 National Census, the village's population was 524 in 116 households. The following census in 2011 counted 425 people in 125 households. The 2016 census measured the population of the village as 374 people in 110 households.
