= Gollijeh-ye Olya =

Village in Zanjan province, Iran

Gollijeh-ye Olya Persian: گليجه عليا
- Village
- Location within Iran
- Coordinates: 36°40′12″N 48°48′22″E
- Country: Iran
- Province: Zanjan
- County: Zanjan
- District: Central
- Rural District: Bonab

Population (2016)
  - Total: 90
- Time zone: UTC+3:30 (IRST)

Gollijeh-ye Olya (Persian: گليجه عليا) (Note: Also romanized as Gollījeh-ye ‘Olyā; also known as Golījeh, Goljeh, Gollījeh, Gollījeh-ye Emām (گليجه امام), Gollūjeh, Guludzhan, and Gulūja) is a village in Bonab Rural District of the Central District in Zanjan County, Zanjan province, Iran.

== Demographics ==
=== Population ===
At the time of the 2006 National Census, the village's population was 41 in 13 households. The following census in 2011 counted 78 people in 30 households. The 2016 census measured the population of the village as 90 people in 30 households.
