= Barut Aghaji, Zanjan =

Village in Zanjan province, Iran

Barut Aghaji Persian: باروت اغاجي
- Village
- Location within Iran
- Coordinates: 36°34′01″N 48°19′34″E
- Country: Iran
- Province: Zanjan
- County: Zanjan
- District: Central
- Rural District: Mojezat

Population (2016)
  - Total: 335
- Time zone: UTC+3:30 (IRST)

Barut Aghaji (Persian: باروت اغاجي) (Note: Also romanized as Bārūt Āghājī; also known as Balūţ Āqājī, Baraalu, and Bārūţ Āqājī) is a village in Mojezat Rural District of the Central District in Zanjan County, Zanjan province, Iran.

== Demographics ==
=== Population ===
At the time of the 2006 National Census, the village's population was 577 in 139 households. The following census in 2011 counted 556 people in 146 households. The 2016 census measured the population of the village as 335 people in 101 households.
