= Kaj Kolah, Zanjan =

Village in Zanjan province, Iran

Kaj Kolah Persian: كج كلاه
- Village
- Location within Iran
- Coordinates: 36°39′48″N 48°41′23″E
- Country: Iran
- Province: Zanjan
- County: Zanjan
- District: Central
- Rural District: Bonab

Population (2016)
  - Total: 21
- Time zone: UTC+3:30 (IRST)

Kaj Kolah (Persian: كج كلاه) (Note: Also romanized as Kaj Kolāh; also known as Gach Kolāh, Kush Kalekh, and Kūsh Qal‘eh) is a village in Bonab Rural District of the Central District in Zanjan County, Zanjan province, Iran.

== Demographics ==
=== Population ===
At the time of the 2006 National Census, the village's population was 46 in 13 households. The following census in 2011 counted 24 people in eight households. The 2016 census measured the population of the village as 21 people in eight households.
