= Deh Sir =

Deh Sir ده‌سیر
- Village
- Location within Iran
- Coordinates: 32°57′30″N 48°16′04″E
- Country: Iran
- Province: Khuzestan
- County: Andimeshk
- Bakhsh: Alvar-e Garmsiri
- Rural District: Qilab

Population (2006)
  - Total: 23
- Time zone: UTC+3:30 (IRST)
  - Summer (DST): UTC+4:30 (IRDT)

Deh Sir (Persian: ده‌سیر, also Romanized as Deh Sīr; also known as Deh-e Shīr and Deh Zīr) is a village in Qilab Rural District, Alvar-e Garmsiri District, Andimeshk County, Khuzestan Province, Iran. At the 2006 census, its population was 23, in 4 families.
