= Golujeh, Meyaneh =

Golujeh گلوجه
- Village
- Location within Iran
- Coordinates: 37°24′30″N 47°59′40″E
- Country: Iran
- Province: East Azerbaijan
- County: Meyaneh
- Bakhsh: Kaghazkonan
- Rural District: Kaghazkonan-e Shomali

Population (2006)
  - Total: 78
- Time zone: UTC+3:30 (IRST)
  - Summer (DST): UTC+4:30 (IRDT)

Golujeh (Persian: گلوجه, also Romanized as Golūjeh; also known as Golījeh) is a village in Kaghazkonan-e Shomali Rural District, Kaghazkonan District, Meyaneh County, East Azerbaijan Province, Iran. At the 2006 census, its population was 78, in 23 families.
