= Qara Shemsi Abdal =

Turkish poet (1828–1886)

Qara Shemsi Abdal (Ottoman Turkish: قارا شمسی عبدال; born 1828 – died 22 September 1886), was a Turkish poet of the Ottoman era. He wrote in Turkish and Persian.

Abdal was born in Konya into a poor family, and did not receive institutional education. He became a member of the Mevlevi Order and was tutored by Emir Şah Kaygusuz, the custodian (türbedar) of Rumi's mausoleum. After his studies under Kaygusuz, he took the name "Abdal" as pen name. Prior to this, he apparently has used the pen names "Shemi", "Nuri", "Shemsi", and "Niazi". Abdal later went to Crete, where he became the shaykh of the retreat of the Mevlevis in Hanya (Chania). He died in Crete as well.

Abdal's son Aref published his father's poems; the first part of the work contains his Persian poems, about the Islamic prophet, the first four caliphs, and the Islamic saints. The last part of the work contains material about the Battle of Karbala, condemnation of Yazid, and other such texts (e.g. an "elegy for the martyrs of Karbala").

== Sources ==
- Yazici, T. (1982). "ABDĀL, QARA ŠEMSĪ". In Yarshater, Ehsan (ed.). Encyclopædia Iranica. Vol. I/2: ʿAbd-al-Hamīd–ʿAbd-al-Hamīd. London and New York: Routledge & Kegan Paul. p. 174. ISBN 978-0-71009-091-1.
