= Zarnan, Zanjan =

Village in Zanjan province, Iran

Zarnan Persian: زرنان
- Village
- Location within Iran
- Coordinates: 36°40′58″N 48°37′13″E
- Country: Iran
- Province: Zanjan
- County: Zanjan
- District: Central
- Rural District: Bonab

Population (2016)
  - Total: 294
- Time zone: UTC+3:30 (IRST)

Zarnan (Persian: زرنان) (Note: Also romanized as Zarnān; also known as Gol Bāgh, Zaran, and Zarlān) is a village in Bonab Rural District of the Central District in Zanjan County, Zanjan province, Iran.

== Demographics ==
=== Population ===
At the time of the 2006 National Census, the village's population was 321 in 72 households. The following census in 2011 counted 368 people in 90 households. The 2016 census measured the population of the village as 294 people in 86 households.

== Attractions ==
Local competitions such as wrestling and horseback riding are held every year in the village, attracting enthusiasts from around the city of Zanjan.

Mount Dushan and Zaranan Castle are also in this area.

== Notable people ==
Among the prominent personalities of the village are Meysam Nassiri, a wrestler of the Iranian national wrestling team, Hajj Abdullah Hasani, and Haj Mansur Hasani and Karbala'i Majid Hasani.
