= Gollujeh-ye Abellu =

Gollujeh-ye Abellu گلوجه ابللو
- Village
- Location within Iran
- Coordinates: 38°35′12″N 46°53′48″E
- Country: Iran
- Province: East Azerbaijan
- County: Ahar
- Bakhsh: Central
- Rural District: Azghan

Population (2006)
  - Total: 77
- Time zone: UTC+3:30 (IRST)
  - Summer (DST): UTC+4:30 (IRDT)

Gollujeh-ye Abellu (Persian: گلوجه ابللو, also Romanized as Gollūjeh-ye Abellū; also known as Goljeh, Gollūjeh, Golujeh, and Gyulyudzha) is a village in Azghan Rural District, in the Central District of Ahar County, East Azerbaijan Province, Iran. At the 2006 census, its population was 77, in 23 families.
