= Qezel Tappeh =

Qezel Tappeh قزل تپه
- Village
- Location within Iran
- Coordinates: 36°22′22″N 47°40′48″E
- Country: Iran
- Province: Kurdistan
- County: Bijar
- Bakhsh: Korani
- Rural District: Korani

Population (2006)
  - Total: 210
- Time zone: UTC+3:30 (IRST)
  - Summer (DST): UTC+4:30 (IRDT)

Qezel Tappeh (Persian: قزل تپه) is a village in Korani Rural District, Korani District, Bijar County, Kurdistan Province, Iran. At the 2006 census its population was 210, in 44 families. The village is populated by Azerbaijanis.
