= Abdal, Azerbaijan =

Abdal
- Village
- Location within Azerbaijan
- Coordinates: 39°51′54″N 46°55′15″E
- Country: Azerbaijan
- District: Aghdam
- Time zone: UTC+4 (AZT)

Abdal is a village in the Aghdam District of Azerbaijan.

== History ==
The village was captured by Armenian forces during the First Nagorno-Karabakh war and all of its original Azerbaijani inhabitants were driven out. It was administrated as part of the Askeran Province of the self-proclaimed Republic of Artsakh under the same name (Աբդալ). The village was returned to Azerbaijan on 20 November 2020 per the 2020 Nagorno-Karabakh ceasefire agreement following the 2020 Nagorno-Karabakh war.
