= Abdal, Gurdaspur, Punjab =

Abdal
- Village
- Interactive map of Abdal
- Coordinates: 31°59′38.12″N 75°00′42.68″E
- Country: India
- State: Punjab
- District: Gurdaspur

Languages
  - Official: Punjabi
- Time zone: UTC+5:30 (IST)

Abdal is a village in Gurdaspur. Gurdaspur is a district in the Indian state of Punjab.
