= Jim Papai =

Canadian gridiron football player

Profile
- Position: Guard

Personal information
- Born: c. 1949 (age 76–77); Brantford, Ontario
- Listed height: 6 ft 0 in (1.83 m)
- Listed weight: 215 lb (98 kg)

Career information
- College: North Carolina

Career history
- 1972: Edmonton Eskimos
- 1972: Hamilton Tiger-Cats

Awards and highlights
- Grey Cup champion (1972)

Jim Papai (born c. 1949) was a Canadian professional football player who played for the Hamilton Tiger-Cats and Edmonton Eskimos. He won the Grey Cup with Hamilton in 1972. He played college football on a football scholarship at the University of North Carolina at Chapel Hill.
