= Kaj Kolah, Khuzestan =

Kaj Kolah كج كلاه
- Village
- Country: Iran
- Province: Khuzestan
- County: Izeh
- Bakhsh: Central
- Rural District: Margha

Population (2006)
  - Total: 52
- Time zone: UTC+3:30 (IRST)
  - Summer (DST): UTC+4:30 (IRDT)

Kaj Kolah (Persian: كج كلاه, also Romanized as Kaj Kolāh) is a village in Margha Rural District, in the Central District of Izeh County, Khuzestan Province, Iran. At the 2006 census, its population was 52, in 9 families.
