= Barut Aghaji, East Azerbaijan =

ghaleh arzehkhoran قلعه ارزه خوران
- Village
- Location within Iran
- Coordinates: 36°55′18″N 47°18′39″E
- Country: Iran
- Province: East Azerbaijan
- County: Charuymaq
- Bakhsh: Shadian
- Rural District: Charuymaq-e Sharqi

Population (2006)
  - Total: 277
- Time zone: UTC+3:30 (IRST)
  - Summer (DST): UTC+4:30 (IRDT)

ghaleh arzehkhoran (Persian: قلعه ارزه خوران, also Romanized as ghaleh arzehkhoran; also known as ghaleh arzehkhoran) is a village in Charuymaq-e Sharqi Rural District, Shadian District, Charuymaq County, East Azerbaijan Province, Iran. At the 2006 census, its population was 277, in 35 families.
