= Dehshir, Yazd =

Village in Yazd province, Iran

Dehshir Persian: ده شير
- Village
- Location within Iran
- Coordinates: 31°27′19″N 53°44′51″E
- Country: Iran
- Province: Yazd
- County: Taft
- District: Central
- Rural District: Dehshir

Population (2016)
  - Total: 1,320
- Time zone: UTC+3:30 (IRST)

Dehshir (Persian: ده شير) (Note: Also romanized as Dehshīr) is a village in, and the capital of, Dehshir Rural District of the Central District of Taft County, Yazd province, Iran.

== Demographics ==
=== Population ===
At the time of the 2006 National Census, the village's population was 1,332 in 377 households. The following census in 2011 counted 1,028 people in 309 households. The 2016 census measured the population of the village as 1,320 people in 437 households. It was the most populous village in its rural district.
