= Jarchi Mosque =

Shia mosque in Isfahan, Iran

- مسجد جارچی
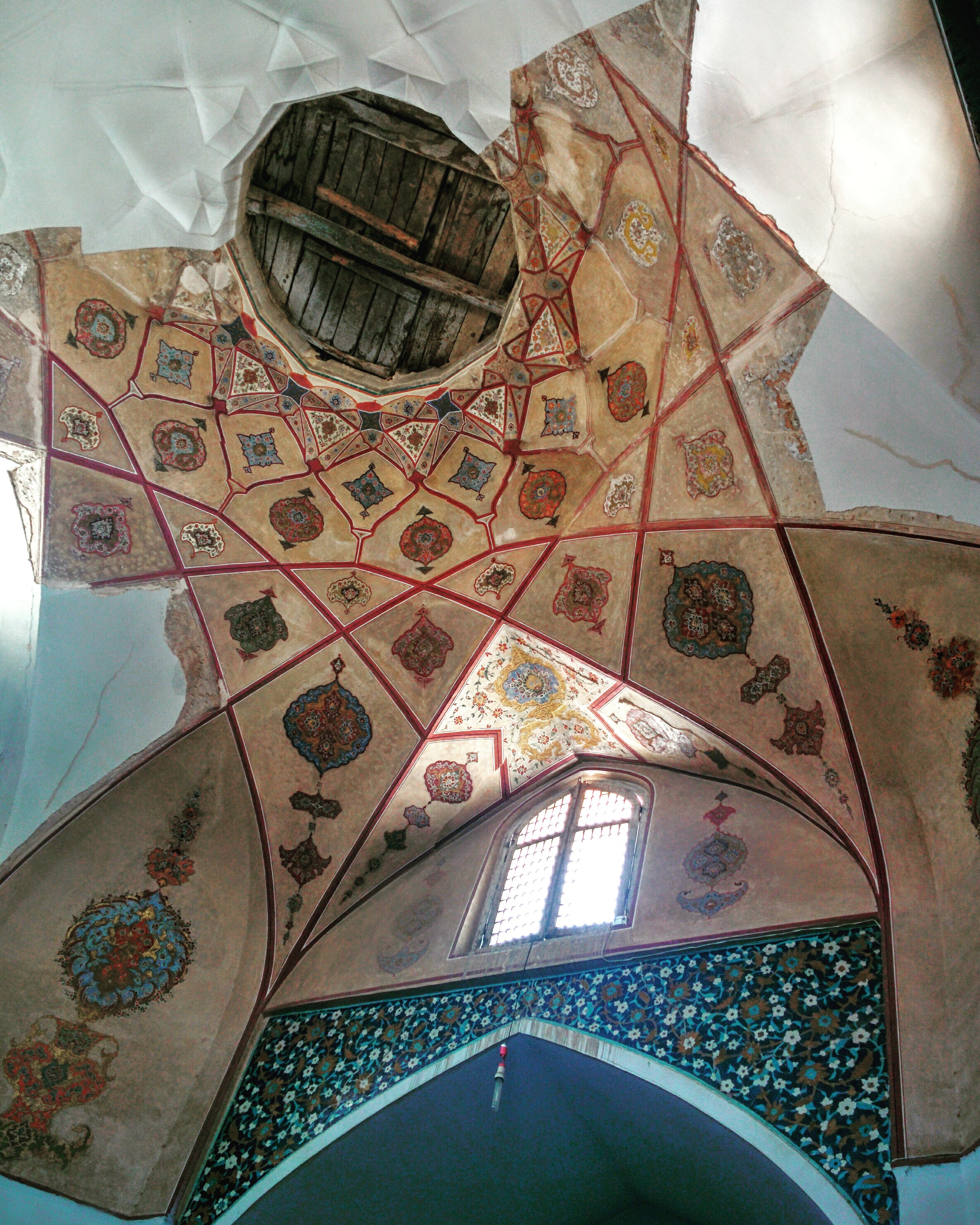
- The interior of the dome in 2014

- Location of the mosque in Iran

Religion
- Affiliation: Shia Islam
- Ecclesiastical or organisational status: Mosque
- Status: Active

Location
- Location: Bazaar of Isfahan, Esfahan, Isfahan Province
- Country: Iran
- Coordinates: 32°39′39″N 51°40′32″E

Architecture
- Type: Mosque architecture
- Style: Isfahani / Safavid
- Founder: Malek Soltan Jarchi Bashi
- Completed: 1610 CE

Specifications
- Dome: One
- Materials: Bricks; stone; tiles; plaster; timber

Iran National Heritage List
- Official name: Jarchi Mosque
- Type: Mosque
- Designated: 1937
- Reference no.: 292
- Conservation organization: Cultural Heritage, Handicrafts and Tourism Organization of Iran

The Jarchi Mosque (Persian: مسجد جارچی) (Note: Also known as the Jarchi Bashi Mosque, the Jarchibashi Mosque, the Malek Soltan Jarchi Bashi Mosque, the Malek Soltan Jarchibashi Mosque, and the Malik Sultan Jarchi Bashi Mosque.) is a Shi'ite mosque located in the Great Bazaar (Bazaar-e-Bozorg) of Esfahan, in the province of Isfahan, Iran.

The mosque was added to the Iran National Heritage List on 20 December 1937, administered by the Cultural Heritage, Handicrafts and Tourism Organization of Iran.

The mosque was built according to a Thuluth inscription above its spandrel in 1610 CE under the supervision of Shah Abbas' herald. In Azeri and Persian languages, the word Jarchi means herald. The mosque has a shabestan and the decorations of the mosque are mainly destroyed.

== See also ==
- Shia Islam in Iran
- List of mosques in Iran
- List of historical structures in Isfahan
