= Abdal, Punjab =

Abdal
- Village
- Location in Punjab, India Abdal (India)
- Coordinates: 31°44′34″N 75°04′45″E
- Country: India
- State: Punjab
- District: Amritsar

Population (2011)
  - Total: 3,170

Languages
  - Official: Punjabi
- Time zone: UTC+5:30 (IST)
- PIN: 143502

Abdal is a village in Amritsar. Amritsar is a district in the Indian state of Punjab. Abdal is located in Amritsar-I tehsil of Amritsar district. As per census 2011, population of this village is 3,170 persons. There are 579 households in Abdal.
