= Abdali, Al Jahra =

Abdali العبدلي
- Village
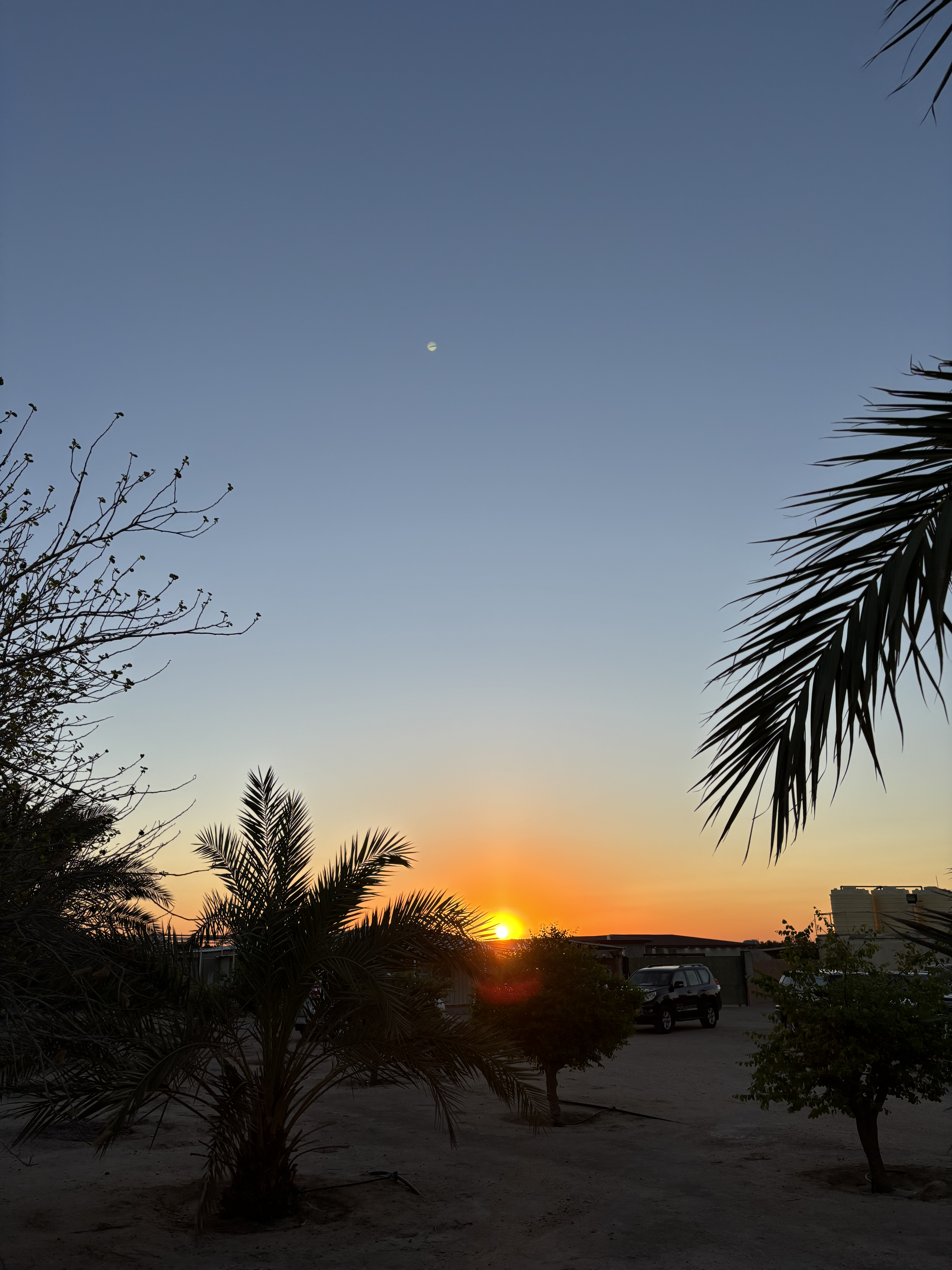
- Sunrise at abdali farm

- Location in Kuwait
- Coordinates: 30.0000°N 47.6833°E
- Country: Kuwait
- Governorate: Al Jahra
- Elevation: 20 m (66 ft)

Population (2025)
  - Total: 6,840
- Time zone: UTC+3 (AST)

Abdali (Arabic: العبدلي) is a village in the Al Jahra Governorate in northern Kuwait, near the border with Iraq. It is known for its agricultural productivity, strategic location, and its role in Kuwait's economic development.

== Geography ==
Abdali is located approximately 90 kilometers north of Kuwait City, at an elevation of about 20 meters (66 feet) above sea level. The village has a population of around 6,840 residents. It lies near Highway 80, historically referred to as the “Highway of Death” due to its significance during the 1991 Gulf War.

== History ==
Due to its proximity to the Iraqi border, Abdali has held strategic importance, especially during regional conflicts. During the 2003 Iraq War, the area was designated a closed military zone, and nearby oil fields such as Abdali and Ratqa were temporarily shut down for security reasons.

== Economy ==
Abdali is part of Kuwait's Economic Zones initiative. The Abdali Economic Zone (AEZ) is being developed as a smart city and logistics hub, with plans to attract over one billion Kuwaiti Dinars in investment and create more than 26,000 jobs. The project is aligned with Kuwait's national vision to diversify its economy and enhance trade connectivity.

== Agriculture ==
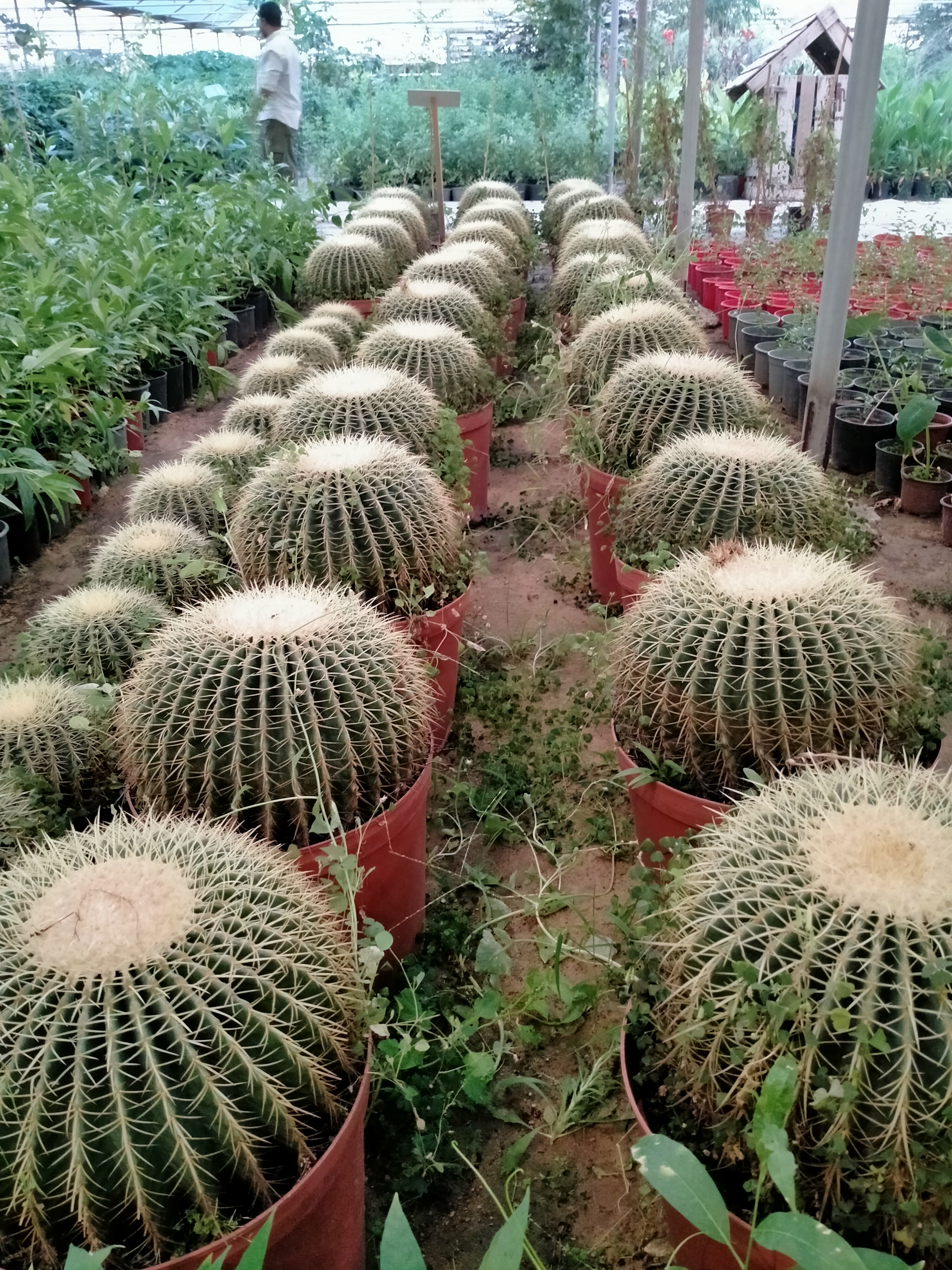

Abdali is one of Kuwait's primary agricultural regions, alongside Wafra and Sulaibiya. It hosts over 1,900 farms producing vegetables, fruits, and flowers. The area is also known for its biodiversity, attracting birdwatchers to species like the Afghan Babbler and Red-wattled Lapwing.

== Tourism and culture ==
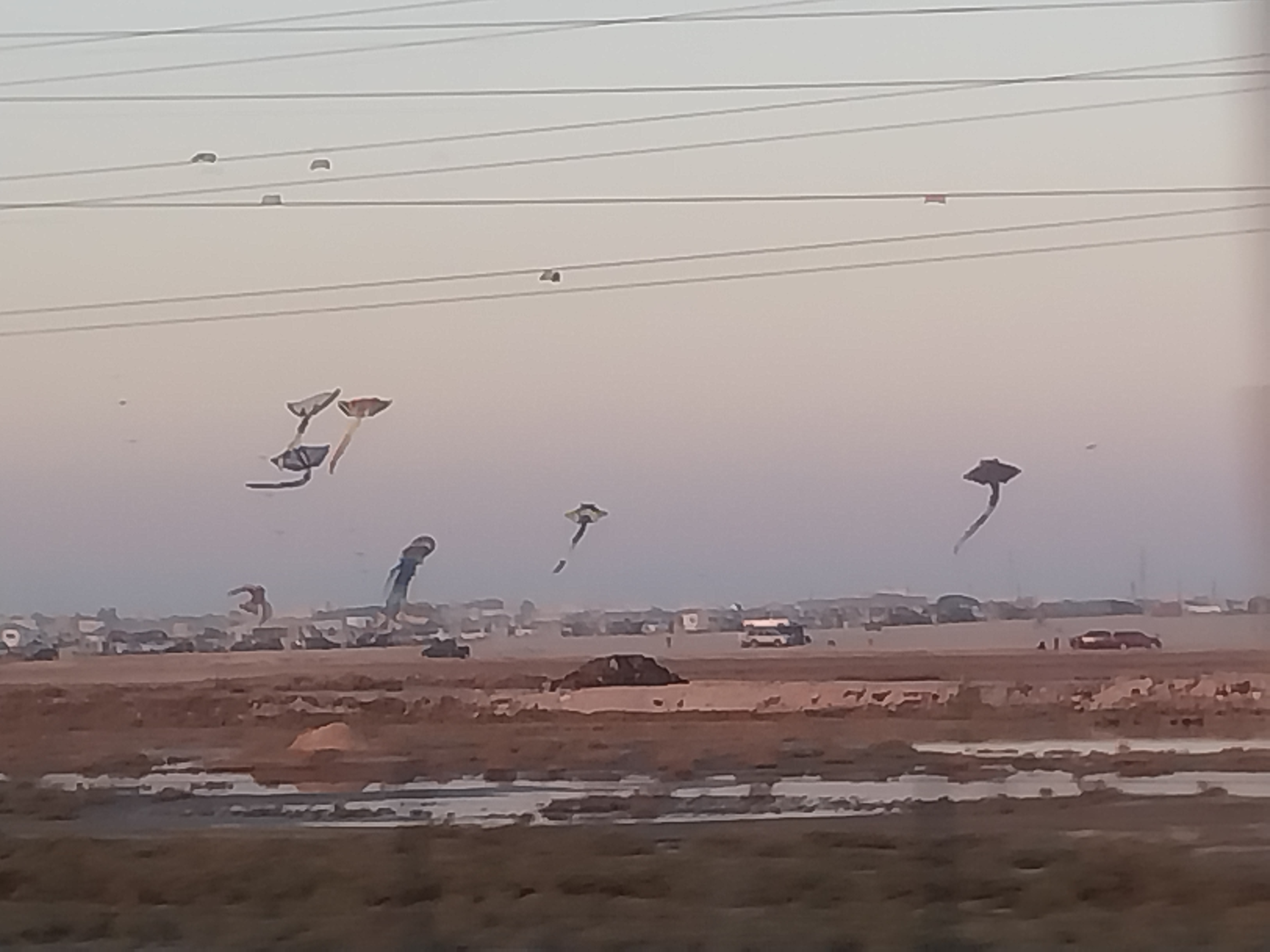
Kite flying by locals during winter season

Abdali has become a popular weekend destination for locals and expatriates. Attractions include Blue Lake Farm, Al Boharya Farm, petting zoos, and seasonal flower gardens. Visitors enjoy fresh produce, sugarcane juice, and scenic countryside views.

== Transportation ==
The village is accessible via Highway 80, connecting Kuwait City to the Iraqi border. Future infrastructure projects like the GCC Railway and Mubarak Al Kabeer Port are expected to enhance Abdali's role as a trade gateway.
