= Dehshir Rural District =

Rural district in Yazd province, Iran

Dehshir Rural District Persian: دهستان دهشير
- Rural District
- Location within Iran
- Coordinates: 31°23′57″N 53°33′08″E
- Country: Iran
- Province: Yazd
- County: Taft
- District: Central
- Capital: Dehshir

Population (2016)
  - Total: 2,855
- Time zone: UTC+3:30 (IRST)

Dehshir Rural District (Persian: دهستان دهشير) is in the Central District of Taft County, Yazd province, Iran. Its capital is the village of Dehshir.

== Demographics ==
=== Population ===
At the time of the 2006 National Census, the rural district's population was 3,173 in 1,047 households. There were 2,567 inhabitants in 911 households at the following census of 2011. The 2016 census measured the population of the rural district as 2,855 in 1,022 households. The most populous of its 238 villages was Dehshir, with 1,320 people.
