= Taham Rural District =

Rural district in Zanjan province, Iran

Taham Rural District Persian: دهستان تهم
- Rural District
- Location within Iran
- Coordinates: 36°49′N 48°34′E
- Country: Iran
- Province: Zanjan
- County: Zanjan
- District: Central
- Established: 1987
- Capital: Homayun

Population (2016)
  - Total: 2,578
- Time zone: UTC+3:30 (IRST)

Taham Rural District (Persian: دهستان تهم) is in the Central District of Zanjan County, Zanjan province, Iran. Its capital is the village of Homayun.

== Demographics ==
=== Population ===
At the time of the 2006 National Census, the rural district's population was 3,336 in 827 households. There were 3,555 inhabitants in 909 households at the following census of 2011. The 2016 census measured the population of the rural district as 2,578 in 811 households. The most populous of its 13 villages was Taham, with 1,073 people.

=== Other villages in the rural district ===
- Aliabad-e Moini
- Chalgan
- Galeh Rud
- Kalkash
- Khoshkeh Rud
- Shilandar
- Taherabad
