= Deh Shirak =

Deh Shirak ده شيرك
- Village
- Location within Iran
- Coordinates: 29°51′30″N 55°49′15″E
- Country: Iran
- Province: Kerman
- County: Sirjan
- Bakhsh: Pariz
- Rural District: Pariz

Population (2006)
  - Total: 176
- Time zone: UTC+3:30 (IRST)
  - Summer (DST): UTC+4:30 (IRDT)

Deh Shirak (Persian: ده شيرك, also Romanized as Deh Shīrak and Deh-e Shīrak; also known as Deh Shīr) is a village in Pariz Rural District, Pariz District, Sirjan County, Kerman Province, Iran. At the 2006 census, its population was 176, in 47 families.
