= Central District (Zanjan County) =

District in Zanjan province, Iran

Central District (Zanjan County) Persian: بخش مرکزی شهرستان زنجان
- District
- Location within Iran
- Coordinates: 36°42′N 48°25′E
- Country: Iran
- Province: Zanjan
- County: Zanjan
- Capital: Zanjan

Population (2016)
  - Total: 482,025
- Time zone: UTC+3:30 (IRST)

The Central District of Zanjan County (Persian: بخش مرکزی شهرستان زنجان) is in Zanjan province, Iran. Its capital is the city of Zanjan.

== Demographics ==
=== Population ===
At the time of the 2006 National Census, the district's population was 395,149 in 102,714 households. The following census in 2011 counted 442,924 people in 126,034 households. The 2016 census measured the population of the district as 482,025 inhabitants in 147,145 households.

=== Administrative divisions ===
Central District (Zanjan County) Population
Administrative Divisions	2006	2011	2016
Bonab RD	11,782	13,665	14,146
Bughda Kandi RD	8,586	8,442	7,133
Mojezat RD	12,448	12,247	10,195
Qoltuq RD (Note: Formerly Saidabad Rural District)	5,284	4,632	3,530
Taham RD	3,336	3,555	2,578
Zanjanrud-e Bala RD	11,912	13,532	13,572
Zanjan (city)	341,801	386,851	430,871
Total	395,149	442,924	482,025
RD = Rural District
