= Mangeli =

Mangeli or Mangali or Mangili (Persian: منگلي) may refer to:

- Mangeli, Bushehr
- Mangeli, Hormozgan
- Mangeli-ye Olya, North Khorasan Province
- Mangeli-ye Sofla, North Khorasan Province
