= Kushkandar =

Village in North Khorasan province, Iran

Kushkandar Persian: كوشكندر
- Village
- Location within Iran
- Coordinates: 36°55′20″N 57°54′42″E
- Country: Iran
- Province: North Khorasan
- County: Bam and Safiabad
- District: Bam
- Rural District: Sarigol

Population (2016)
  - Total: 138
- Time zone: UTC+3:30 (IRST)

Kushkandar (Persian: كوشكندر) (Note: Also romanized as Kūshk Andar and Kūshkandar; also known as Koshkandar) is a village in Sarigol Rural District of Bam District in Bam and Safiabad County, North Khorasan province, Iran.

== Demographics ==
=== Population ===
At the time of the 2006 National Census, the village's population was 201 in 69 households, when it was in Bam Rural District of Bam and Safiabad District (Note: Renamed the Central District of Bam and Safiabad County) in Esfarayen County. The following census in 2011 counted 188 people in 67 households. The 2016 census measured the population of the village as 138 people in 61 households.

In 2023, the district was separated from the county in the establishment of Bam and Safiabad County and renamed the Central District. The rural district was transferred to the new Bam District, and Kushkandar was transferred to Sarigol Rural District created in the same district.
