= Khorramdarreh (disambiguation) =

Khorramdarreh is a city in Zanjan Province, Iran.

Khorramdarreh or Khorram Darreh (Persian: خرمدره) may also refer to:

- Khorramdarreh, Isfahan
- Khorramdarreh, Kerman
- Khorram Darreh, Razavi Khorasan
- Khorram Darreh, Abhar, Zanjan Province
- Khorramdarreh County, in Zanjan Province
- Khorramdarreh Rural District, in Zanjan Province
