= Isa Bagh =

Village in North Khorasan province, Iran

Isa Bagh Persian: عيسي باغ
- Village
- Location within Iran
- Coordinates: 36°55′32″N 57°54′15″E
- Country: Iran
- Province: North Khorasan
- County: Bam and Safiabad
- District: Bam
- Rural District: Sarigol

Population (2016)
  - Total: 45
- Time zone: UTC+3:30 (IRST)

Isa Bagh (Persian: عيسي باغ) (Note: Also romanized as ‘Īsá Bāgh) is a village in Sarigol Rural District of Bam District in Bam and Safiabad County, North Khorasan province, Iran.

== Demographics ==
=== Population ===
At the time of the 2006 National Census, the village's population was 65 in 22 households, when it was in Bam Rural District of Bam and Safiabad District (Note: Renamed the Central District of Bam and Safiabad County) in Esfarayen County. The following census in 2011 counted 56 people in 24 households. The 2016 census measured the population of the village as 45 people in 22 households.

In 2023, the district was separated from the county in the establishment of Bam and Safiabad County and renamed the Central District. The rural district was transferred to the new Bam District, and Isa Bagh was transferred to Sarigol Rural District created in the same district.
