= Dahaneh-ye Ojaq =

Village in North Khorasan province, Iran

Dahaneh-ye Ojaq Persian: دهنه اجاق
- Village
- Location within Iran
- Coordinates: 36°54′58″N 57°46′53″E
- Country: Iran
- Province: North Khorasan
- County: Bam and Safiabad
- District: Bam
- Rural District: Sarigol

Population (2016)
  - Total: 1,046
- Time zone: UTC+3:30 (IRST)

Dahaneh-ye Ojaq (Persian: دهنه اجاق) (Note: Also romanized as Dahaneh Ojāq and Dahaneh-ye Ojāq; also known as Dehāneh-i-Ujāgat and Dahaneh-yē Ūjāq) is a village in, and the capital of, Sarigol Rural District in Bam District of Bam and Safiabad County, North Khorasan province, Iran.

== Demographics ==
=== Population ===
At the time of the 2006 National Census, the village's population was 1,160 in 328 households, when it was in Bam Rural District of Bam and Safiabad District (Note: Renamed the Central District of Bam and Safiabad County) in Esfarayen County. The following census in 2011 counted 1,218 people in 384 households. The 2016 census measured the population of the village as 1,046 people in 345 households.

In 2023, the district was separated from the county in the establishment of Bam and Safiabad County and renamed the Central District. The rural district was transferred to the new Bam District, and Dahaneh-ye Ojaq was transferred to Sarigol Rural District created in the same district.
