= Zali, North Khorasan =

Village in North Khorasan province, Iran

Zali Persian: زالي
- Village
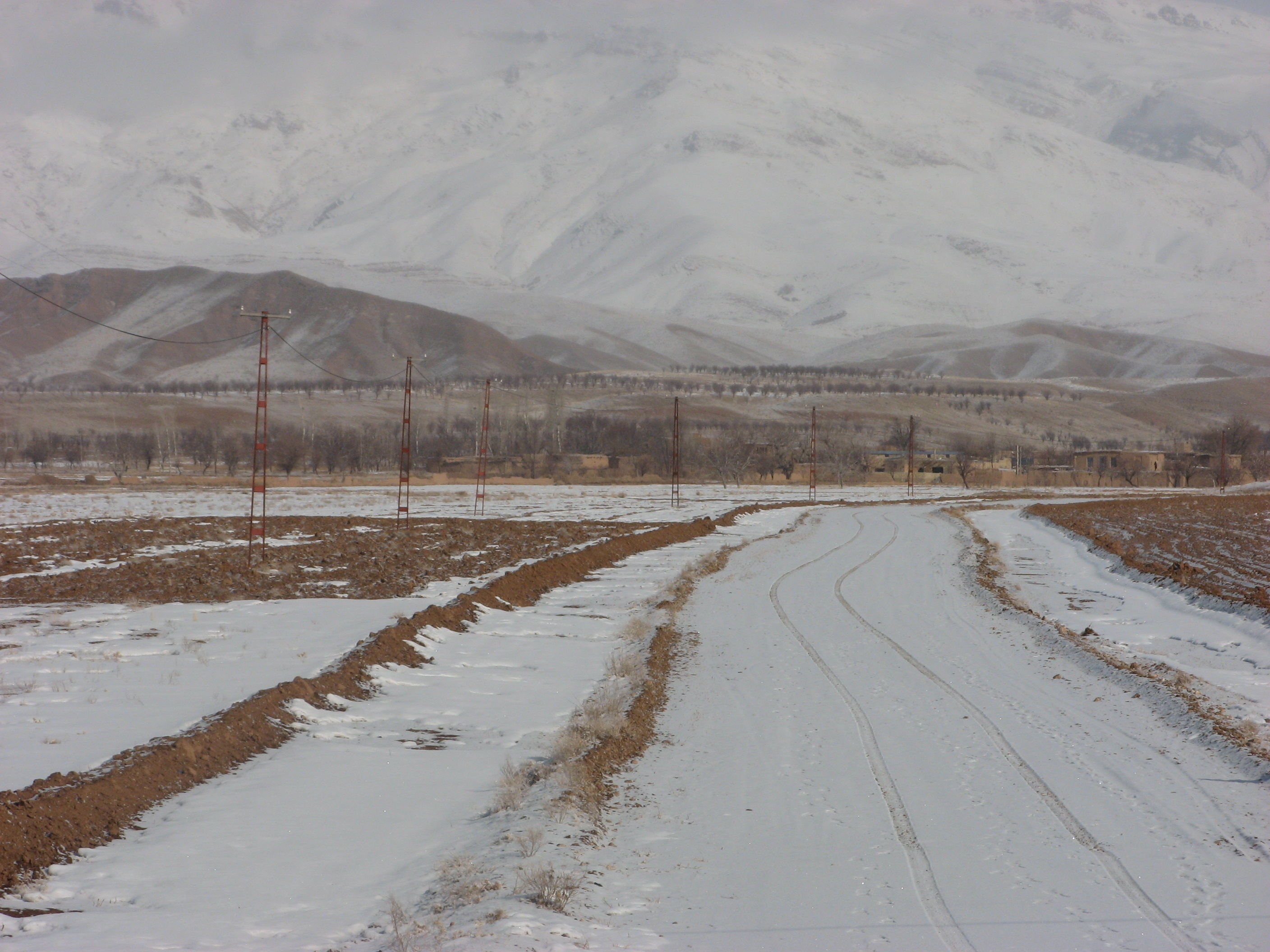
- The village of Zali

- Location within Iran
- Coordinates: 36°54′36″N 57°52′31″E
- Country: Iran
- Province: North Khorasan
- County: Bam and Safiabad
- District: Bam
- Rural District: Sarigol

Population (2016)
  - Total: 56
- Time zone: UTC+3:30 (IRST)

Zali (Persian: زالي) (Note: Also romanized as Zālī) is a village in Sarigol Rural District of Bam District in Bam and Safiabad County, North Khorasan province, Iran.

== Pre-history and archaeology ==
Documented historical name of the village has been called the Nahamod that happens to the Timurid period. AH of the 12 villages mentioned Arghyan Arghyan pass to the world one of these villages are listed: Rueen village and functions، Ardin village and functions،Dastger village and functions ،Karizdar village،Bekrabad village،Nahamod village،Jahan village and functions ،Ban village and functions ،Sfanj village and functions ،Khargh village and functions.....

== Demographics ==
=== Population ===
At the time of the 2006 National Census, the village's population was 81 in 18 households, when it was in Bam Rural District of Bam and Safiabad District (Note: Renamed the Central District of Bam and Safiabad County) in Esfarayen County. The following census in 2011 counted 77 people in 23 households. The 2016 census measured the population of the village as 56 people in 21 households.

In 2023, the district was separated from the county in the establishment of Bam and Safiabad County and renamed the Central District. The rural district was transferred to the new Bam District, and Zali was transferred to Sarigol Rural District created in the same district.

== Geography ==
=== Climate ===
Zali has a humid climate with hot summers and relatively wet cold winters. Temperatures during the hottest time of year (August and September) are up to 35 C and rainfall is sparse in the May until December, respectively.

=== Rivers ===
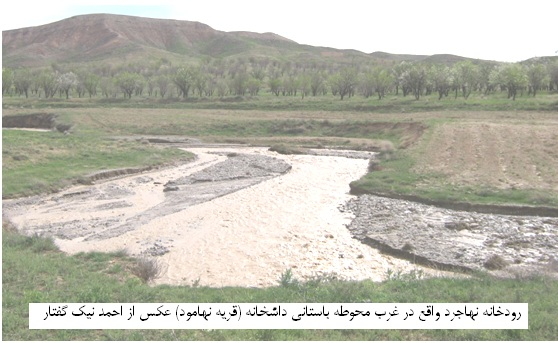
Nhajrd Cal river 1km north of the village of Zali.

The 'Nhajrd Cal' River, with a catchment area of 62 square kilometers, can be normal for torrential flows to happen. During the river Grdydhast an estimated 5% cubic meters per second can accour. Dashkhaneh, Khoshab also known as Cal.

== Aqueducts ==
Subterranean Dashkhaneh,: The aqueduct is located in the northern area of the mother Dashkhaneh, Khoshab ancient wells because there is no closure. The Subterranean In the village of village drinking water supply has Nhamvd. Subterranean zali,: Zali village 5 km long canal in a ring that embodies it as a canal is the mother in the village wells to 9 feet in some places.
