= Baba Qodrat =

Village in North Khorasan province, Iran

Baba Qodrat Persian: باباقدرت
- Village
- Location within Iran
- Coordinates: 36°55′40″N 57°44′10″E
- Country: Iran
- Province: North Khorasan
- County: Bam and Safiabad
- District: Bam
- Rural District: Sarigol

Population (2016)
  - Total: Below reporting threshold
- Time zone: UTC+3:30 (IRST)

Baba Qodrat (Persian: باباقدرت) (Note: Also romanized as Bābā Qodrat; also known as Emāmzādeh Bābā Qodrat) is a village in Sarigol Rural District of Bam District in Bam and Safiabad County, North Khorasan province, Iran.

The village is located next to the Baba Ghodrat Shrine, the mausoleum of Baba Hossein. The tomb is located in a converted cave. Its chapel has a 9-meter dome visible in an excavated trench on top of the hill above the shrine.

== Demographics ==
=== Population ===
At the time of the 2006 National Census, the village's population was 16 in five households, when it was in Bam Rural District of Bam and Safiabad District (Note: Renamed the Central District of Bam and Safiabad County) in Esfarayen County. The following censuses in 2011 and 2016 counted a population below the reporting threshold.

In 2023, the district was separated from the county in the establishment of Bam and Safiabad County and renamed the Central District. The rural district was transferred to the new Bam District, and Baba Qodrat was transferred to Sarigol Rural District created in the same district.
