= Dastjerd, North Khorasan =

Village in North Khorasan province, Iran

Dastjerd Persian: دستجرد
- Village
- Location within Iran
- Coordinates: 36°52′55″N 57°50′34″E
- Country: Iran
- Province: North Khorasan
- County: Bam and Safiabad
- District: Bam
- Rural District: Sarigol

Population (2016)
  - Total: 463
- Time zone: UTC+3:30 (IRST)

Dastjerd (Persian: دستجرد) is a village in Sarigol Rural District of Bam District in Bam and Safiabad County, North Khorasan province, Iran.

== Demographics ==
=== Population ===
At the time of the 2006 National Census, the village's population was 569 in 162 households, when it was in Bam Rural District of Bam and Safiabad District (Note: Renamed the Central District of Bam and Safiabad County) in Esfarayen County. The following census in 2011 counted 469 people in 157 households. The 2016 census measured the population of the village as 463 people in 174 households.

In 2023, the district was separated from the county in the establishment of Bam and Safiabad County and renamed the Central District. The rural district was transferred to the new Bam District, and Dastjerd was transferred to Sarigol Rural District created in the same district.
