= Chahar Mast =

Village in North Khorasan province, Iran

Chahar Mast Persian: چهارمست
- Village
- Location within Iran
- Coordinates: 36°55′16″N 57°50′26″E
- Country: Iran
- Province: North Khorasan
- County: Bam and Safiabad
- District: Bam
- Rural District: Sarigol

Population (2016)
  - Total: 80
- Time zone: UTC+3:30 (IRST)

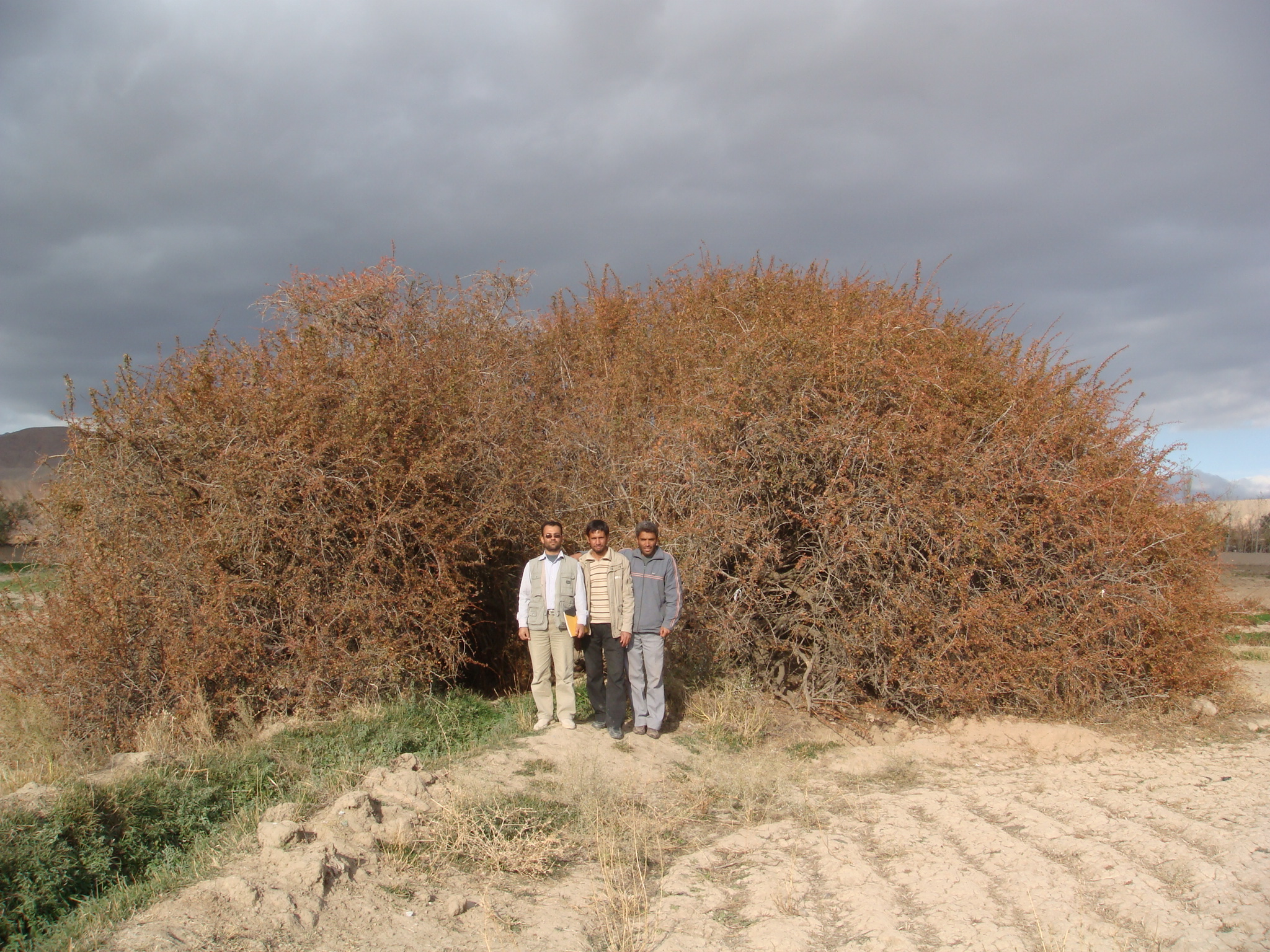
Landscape view in Chahar Mast

Chahar Mast (Persian: چهارمست) (Note: Also romanized as Chahār Mast; also known as Chahār Faṣel) is a village in Sarigol Rural District of Bam District in Bam and Safiabad County, North Khorasan province, Iran.

== Demographics ==
=== Population ===
At the time of the 2006 National Census, the village's population was 82 in 21 households, when it was in Bam Rural District of Bam and Safiabad District (Note: Renamed the Central District of Bam and Safiabad County) in Esfarayen County. The following census in 2011 counted 69 people in 18 households. The 2016 census measured the population of the village as 80 people in 26 households.

In 2023, the district was separated from the county in the establishment of Bam and Safiabad County and renamed the Central District. The rural district was transferred to the new Bam District, and Chahar Mast was transferred to Sarigol Rural District created in the same district.
