= Karizdar =

Village in North Khorasan province, Iran

Karizdar Persian: كاريزدر
- Village
- Location within Iran
- Coordinates: 36°53′10″N 57°49′37″E
- Country: Iran
- Province: North Khorasan
- County: Bam and Safiabad
- District: Bam
- Rural District: Sarigol

Population (2016)
  - Total: 145
- Time zone: UTC+3:30 (IRST)

Karizdar (Persian: كاريزدر) (Note: Also romanized as Kārīzdar) is a village in Sarigol Rural District of Bam District in Bam and Safiabad County, North Khorasan province, Iran.

== Demographics ==
=== Population ===
At the time of the 2006 National Census, the village's population was 204 in 53 households, when it was in Bam Rural District of Bam and Safiabad District (Note: Renamed the Central District of Bam and Safiabad County) in Esfarayen County. The following census in 2011 counted 161 people in 48 households. The 2016 census measured the population of the village as 145 people in 54 households.

In 2023, the district was separated from the county in the establishment of Bam and Safiabad County and renamed the Central District. The rural district was transferred to the new Bam District, and Karizdar was transferred to Sarigol Rural District created in the same district.
