= Now Deh-e Bam =

Village in North Khorasan province, Iran

Now Deh-e Bam Persian: نوده بام
- Village
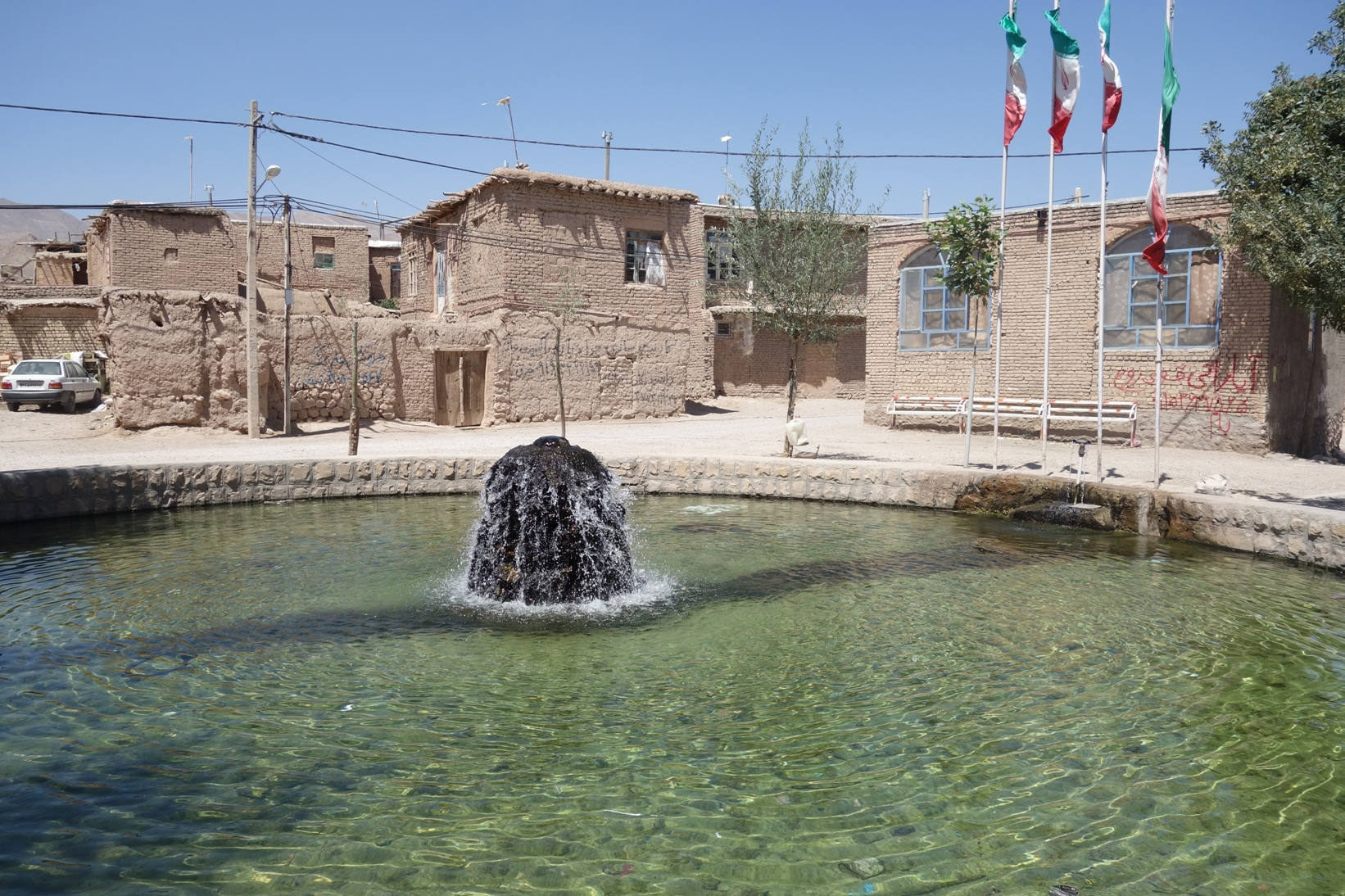
- The village of Now Deh-e Bam

- Location within Iran
- Coordinates: 36°57′28″N 57°56′15″E
- Country: Iran
- Province: North Khorasan
- County: Bam and Safiabad
- District: Bam
- Rural District: Bam

Population (2016)
  - Total: 825
- Time zone: UTC+3:30 (IRST)

Now Deh-e Bam (Persian: نوده بام) (Note: Also romanized as Now Deh Bām and Now Deh-e Bām; also known as Nodeh Bam, Nodeh Bām, and Now Deh) is a village in Bam Rural District of Bam District in Bam and Safiabad County, North Khorasan province, Iran.

== Demographics ==
=== Population ===
At the time of the 2006 National Census, the village's population was 985 in 296 households, when it was in Bam and Safiabad District (Note: Renamed the Central District of Bam and Safiabad County) of Esfarayen County. The following census in 2011 counted 860 people in 306 households. The 2016 census measured the population of the village as 825 people in 322 households.

In 2023, the district was separated from the county in the establishment of Bam and Safiabad County and renamed the Central District. The rural district was transferred to the new Bam District.
