= Khalifehlu, Khorramdarreh =

Village in Zanjan province, Iran

Khalifehlu Persian: خليفه لو
- Village
- Location within Iran
- Coordinates: 36°17′27″N 49°12′03″E
- Country: Iran
- Province: Zanjan
- County: Khorramdarreh
- District: Central
- Rural District: Alvand

Population (2016)
  - Total: 48
- Time zone: UTC+3:30 (IRST)

Khalifehlu (Persian: خليفه لو) (Note: Also romanized as Khalīfehlū; also known as Khalaf ‘Alī and Khal’falu) is a village in Alvand Rural District of the Central District in Khorramdarreh County, Zanjan province, Iran.

Located about 7 km north of Khorramdarreh, in the central part of the Tarom magmatic zone, Khalifehlu is the site of significant epithermal ore deposits including copper and gold. hydrothermal alteration, extensive breccia formation, and silicic veins are among the significant characteristics of the Khalifehlu deposit. The ores found at Khalifehlu include pyrite, chalcopyrite, bornite, covolite, chalcocite, hematite, and native gold.

== Demographics ==
=== Population ===
At the time of the 2006 National Census, the village's population was 80 in 22 households. The following census in 2011 counted 49 people in 14 households. The 2016 census measured the population of the village as 48 people in 13 households.
