= Kalateh-ye Bam =

Village in North Khorasan province, Iran

Kalateh-ye Bam Persian: كلاته بام
- Village
- Location within Iran
- Coordinates: 36°55′24″N 58°01′16″E
- Country: Iran
- Province: North Khorasan
- County: Bam and Safiabad
- District: Bam
- Rural District: Bam

Population (2016)
  - Total: 168
- Time zone: UTC+3:30 (IRST)

Kalateh-ye Bam (Persian: كلاته بام) (Note: Also romanized as Kalāteh-ye Bām) is a village in Bam Rural District of Bam District in Bam and Safiabad County, North Khorasan province, Iran.

== Demographics ==
=== Population ===
At the time of the 2006 National Census, the village's population was 274 in 81 households, when it was in Bam and Safiabad District (Note: Renamed the Central District of Bam and Safiabad County) of Esfarayen County. The following census in 2011 counted 211 people in 68 households. The 2016 census measured the population of the village as 168 people in 72 households.

In 2023, the district was separated from the county in the establishment of Bam and Safiabad County and renamed the Central District. The rural district was transferred to the new Bam District.
