= Bagheshjerd =

Village in North Khorasan province, Iran

Bagheshjerd Persian: باغشجرد
- Village
- Location within Iran
- Coordinates: 36°49′14″N 58°02′09″E
- Country: Iran
- Province: North Khorasan
- County: Bam and Safiabad
- District: Central
- Rural District: Dahaneh-ye Shirin

Population (2016)
  - Total: 265
- Time zone: UTC+3:30 (IRST)

Bagheshjerd (Persian: باغشجرد) (Note: Also romanized as Bāgheshjerd; also known as Bāgheshgerd) is a village in Dahaneh-ye Shirin Rural District of the Central District (Note: Formerly Bam and Safiabad District of Esfarayen County) in Bam and Safiabad County, North Khorasan province, Iran.

== Demographics ==
=== Population ===
At the time of the 2006 National Census, the village's population was 471 in 101 households, when it was in Safiabad Rural District of Bam and Safiabad District (Note: Renamed the Central District of Bam and Safiabad County) in Esfarayen County. The following census in 2011 counted 411 people in 98 households. The 2016 census measured the population of the village as 265 people in 82 households.

In 2023, the district was separated from the county in the establishment of Bam and Safiabad County and renamed the Central District. Bagheshjerd was transferred to Dahaneh-ye Shirin Rural District created in the same district.
