= Quch Qar =

Village in North Khorasan province, Iran

Quch Qar Persian: قوچقر
- Village
- Location within Iran
- Coordinates: 36°55′46″N 58°02′16″E
- Country: Iran
- Province: North Khorasan
- County: Bam and Safiabad
- District: Bam
- Rural District: Bam

Population (2016)
  - Total: 43
- Time zone: UTC+3:30 (IRST)

Quch Qar (Persian: قوچقر) (Note: Also romanized as Qūch Qar) is a village in Bam Rural District of Bam District in Bam and Safiabad County, North Khorasan province, Iran.

== Demographics ==
=== Population ===
At the time of the 2006 National Census, the village's population was 84 in 24 households, when it was in Bam and Safiabad District (Note: Renamed the Central District of Bam and Safiabad County) of Esfarayen County. The following census in 2011 counted 67 people in 22 households. The 2016 census measured the population of the village as 43 people in 20 households.

In 2023, the district was separated from the county in the establishment of Bam and Safiabad County and renamed the Central District. The rural district was transferred to the new Bam District.
