= Dahaneh-ye Shirin =

Village in North Khorasan province, Iran

Dahaneh-ye Shirin Persian: دهنه شيرين
- Village
- Location within Iran
- Coordinates: 36°39′39″N 58°01′46″E
- Country: Iran
- Province: North Khorasan
- County: Bam and Safiabad
- District: Central
- Rural District: Dahaneh-ye Shirin

Population (2016)
  - Total: 551
- Time zone: UTC+3:30 (IRST)

Dahaneh-ye Shirin (Persian: دهنه شيرين) (Note: Also romanized as Dahneh-ye Shīrīn) is a village in, and the capital of, Dahaneh-ye Shirin Rural District in the Central District (Note: Formerly Bam and Safiabad District of Esfarayen County) of Bam and Safiabad County, North Khorasan province, Iran.

== Demographics ==
=== Population ===
At the time of the 2006 National Census, the village's population was 559 in 151 households, when it was in Safiabad Rural District of Bam and Safiabad District (Note: Renamed the Central District of Bam and Safiabad County) in Esfarayen County. The following census in 2011 counted 613 people in 173 households. The 2016 census measured the population of the village as 551 people in 175 households.

In 2023, the district was separated from the county in the establishment of Bam and Safiabad County and renamed the Central District. Dahaneh-ye Shirin was transferred to Dahaneh-ye Shirin Rural District created in the same district.
