= Ardin =

Ardin may refer to:

- Ardin, Deux-Sèvres, France
- Ardin, North Khorasan, Iran
- Ardin, Zanjan, Iran
- Ardin, Khorramdarreh, Zanjan Province, Iran
- Ardin (harp), a musical instrument of Mauritania
- Mattias Ardin (born 1969), Swedish officer
