= Alwand =

Alwand may refer to:

- Alwand Quli, a village in Kurdistan Province, Iran
- Alwand River, in eastern Iraq and western Iran

== See also ==
- Alvand (disambiguation)
- Alwandi, a village in Karnataka, India
