= Aq Qaleh, Bam and Safiabad =

Village in North Khorasan province, Iran

Aq Qaleh Persian: اق قلعه
- Village
- Location within Iran
- Coordinates: 36°56′02″N 58°03′18″E
- Country: Iran
- Province: North Khorasan
- County: Bam and Safiabad
- District: Bam
- Rural District: Bam

Population (2016)
  - Total: 219
- Time zone: UTC+3:30 (IRST)

Aq Qaleh (Persian: اق قلعه) (Note: Also romanized as Āq Qal‘eh) is a village in Bam Rural District of Bam District in Bam and Safiabad County, North Khorasan province, Iran.

== Demographics ==
=== Population ===
At the time of the 2006 National Census, the village's population was 446 in 117 households, when it was in Bam and Safiabad District (Note: Renamed the Central District of Bam and Safiabad County) of Esfarayen County. The following census in 2011 counted 350 people in 93 households. The 2016 census measured the population of the village as 219 people in 77 households.

In 2023, the district was separated from the county in the establishment of Bam and Safiabad County and renamed the Central District. The rural district was transferred to the new Bam District.
