= Vistan =

Vistan or Veyestan or Wistan (Persian: ويستان) may refer to:

- Vistən, Azerbaijan
- Vistan-e Bala, Iran
- Vistan-e Pain, Iran
