= Ghuzeh Zan =

Village in North Khorasan province, Iran

Ghuzeh Zan Persian: غوزه زن
- Village
- Location within Iran
- Coordinates: 36°54′34″N 58°03′47″E
- Country: Iran
- Province: North Khorasan
- County: Bam and Safiabad
- District: Bam
- Rural District: Bam

Population (2016)
  - Total: 149
- Time zone: UTC+3:30 (IRST)

Ghuzeh Zan (Persian: غوزه زن) (Note: Also romanized as Ghūzeh Zan; also known as Geyūeh Jān (گيوه جان) and Qūzeh Zan) is a village in Bam Rural District of Bam District in Bam and Safiabad County, North Khorasan province, Iran.

== Demographics ==
=== Population ===
At the time of the 2006 National Census, the village's population was 209 in 47 households, when it was in Bam and Safiabad District (Note: Renamed the Central District of Bam and Safiabad County) of Esfarayen County. The following census in 2011 counted 197 people in 46 households. The 2016 census measured the population of the village as 149 people in 45 households.

In 2023, the district was separated from the county in the establishment of Bam and Safiabad County and renamed the Central District. The rural district was transferred to the new Bam District.
