= Bishabad =

Village in North Khorasan province, Iran

Bishabad Persian: بيش اباد
- Village
- Location within Iran
- Coordinates: 36°58′04″N 57°58′54″E
- Country: Iran
- Province: North Khorasan
- County: Bam and Safiabad
- District: Bam
- Rural District: Bam

Population (2016)
  - Total: 112
- Time zone: UTC+3:30 (IRST)

Bishabad (Persian: بيش اباد) (Note: Also romanized as Bīshābād; also known as Bashābād) is a village in Bam Rural District of Bam District in Bam and Safiabad County, North Khorasan province, Iran.

== Demographics ==
=== Population ===
At the time of the 2006 National Census, the village's population was 190 in 50 households, when it was in Bam and Safiabad District (Note: Renamed the Central District of Bam and Safiabad County) of Esfarayen County. The following census in 2011 counted 106 people in 45 households. The 2016 census measured the population of the village as 112 people in 49 households.

In 2023, the district was separated from the county in the establishment of Bam and Safiabad County and renamed the Central District. The rural district was transferred to the new Bam District.
