= Ardin, Iran =

Ardin (Persian: اردين) may refer to:

- Ardin, North Khorasan
- Ardin, Zanjan
- Ardin, Khorramdarreh, Zanjan Province
