= Anbarabad, North Khorasan =

Village in North Khorasan province, Iran

Anbarabad Persian: عنبراباد
- Village
- Location within Iran
- Coordinates: 36°51′22″N 58°03′02″E
- Country: Iran
- Province: North Khorasan
- County: Bam and Safiabad
- District: Bam
- Rural District: Bam

Population (2016)
  - Total: 98
- Time zone: UTC+3:30 (IRST)

Anbarabad (Persian: عنبراباد) (Note: Also romanized as ‘Anbarābād) is a village in Bam Rural District of Bam District in Bam and Safiabad County, North Khorasan province, Iran.

== Demographics ==
=== Population ===
At the time of the 2006 National Census, the village's population was 144 in 46 households, when it was in Bam and Safiabad District (Note: Renamed the Central District of Bam and Safiabad County) of Esfarayen County. The following census in 2011 counted 135 people in 52 households. The 2016 census measured the population of the village as 98 people in 38 households.

In 2023, the district was separated from the county in the establishment of Bam and Safiabad County and renamed the Central District. The rural district was transferred to the new Bam District.
