= Bagh Darreh =

Village in Zanjan province, Iran

Bagh Darreh Persian: باغ دره
- Village
- Location within Iran
- Coordinates: 36°12′56″N 48°59′20″E
- Country: Iran
- Province: Zanjan
- County: Khorramdarreh
- District: Central
- Rural District: Khorramdarreh

Population (2016)
  - Total: 188
- Time zone: UTC+3:30 (IRST)

Bagh Darreh (Persian: باغ دره) (Note: Also romanized as Bāgh Darreh; also known as Bag-Darrekh) is a village in Khorramdarreh Rural District of the Central District in Khorramdarreh County, Zanjan province, Iran.

== Demographics ==
=== Population ===
At the time of the 2006 National Census, the village's population was 294 in 61 households. The following census in 2011 counted 250 people in 78 households. The 2016 census measured the population of the village as 188 people in 62 households.
