= Khalaj, Khorramdarreh =

Village in Zanjan province, Iran

Khalaj Persian: خلج
- Village
- Location within Iran
- Coordinates: 36°16′25″N 49°16′11″E
- Country: Iran
- Province: Zanjan
- County: Khorramdarreh
- District: Central
- Rural District: Khorramdarreh

Population (2016)
  - Total: 32
- Time zone: UTC+3:30 (IRST)

Khalaj (Persian: خلج) (Note: Also known as Khalach) is a village in Khorramdarreh Rural District of the Central District in Khorramdarreh County, Zanjan province, Iran.

== Demographics ==
=== Population ===
At the time of the 2006 National Census, the village's population was 30 in 11 households. The following census in 2011 counted 24 people in 11 households. The 2016 census measured the population of the village as 32 people in nine households.
