= Alvand (disambiguation) =

Alvand is a mountain in Iran.

Alvand may also refer to:

- Əlvənd, a village in Azerbaijan
- Alvand, Iran, a city in Qazvin Province, Iran
- Alvand, Kohgiluyeh and Boyer-Ahmad, a village in Kohgiluyeh and Boyer-Ahmad Province, Iran
- Alvand, South Khorasan, a village in South Khorasan Province, Iran
- Alvand, Zanjan, a village in Zanjan Province, Iran
- Alvand Rural District (disambiguation), administrative subdivisions of Iran
- Iranian frigate Alvand
- Alvand-class frigate
