= Dulchah =

Village in North Khorasan province, Iran

Dulchah Persian: دول چاه
- Village
- Location within Iran
- Coordinates: 36°49′47″N 57°40′49″E
- Country: Iran
- Province: North Khorasan
- County: Bam and Safiabad
- District: Central
- Rural District: Safiabad

Population (2016)
  - Total: 203
- Time zone: UTC+3:30 (IRST)

Dulchah (Persian: دول چاه) (Note: Also romanized as Dūlchāh) is a village in Safiabad Rural District of the Central District (Note: Formerly Bam and Safiabad District of Esfarayen County) in Bam and Safiabad County, North Khorasan province, Iran.

== Demographics ==
=== Population ===
At the time of the 2006 National Census, the village's population was 231 in 43 households, when it was in Bam and Safiabad District (Note: Renamed the Central District of Bam and Safiabad County) of Esfarayen County. The following census in 2011 counted 231 people in 51 households. The 2016 census measured the population of the village as 203 people in 56 households.

In 2023, the district was separated from the county in the establishment of Bam and Safiabad County and renamed the Central District.
