= Abhar and Khorramdarreh (electoral district) =

Constituency of the Iranian parliament

- Electoral district constituency for the Zanjan
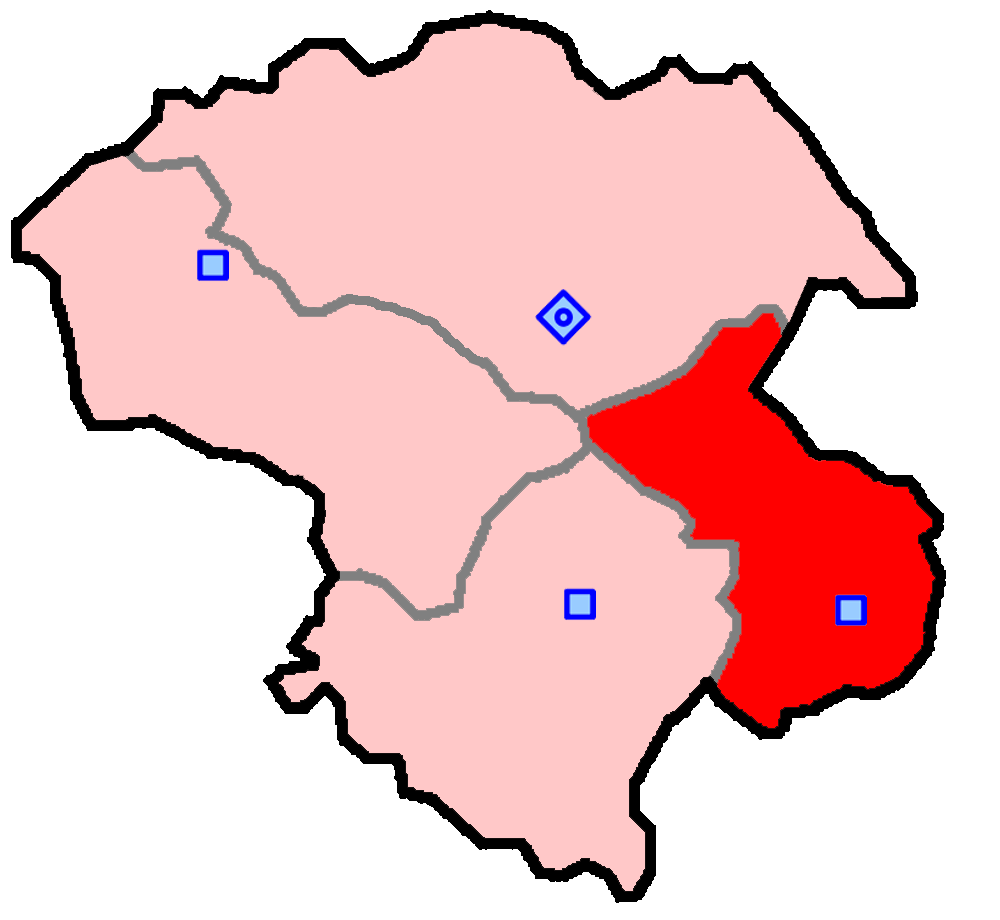
- Abhar and Khorramdarreh shown within Zanjan Province
- Zanjan Province: Abhar County and Khorramdarreh County

Current constituency
- Assembly Members: Mohammad Azizi

Abhar and Khorramdarreh (electoral district) is the 2nd electoral district in the Zanjan Province of Iran. It has a population of 234,342 and elects 1 member of parliament.

== 1980 ==
MP in 1980 from the electorate of Abhar. (1st)

- Farajollah Vaezi

== 1984 ==
MP in 1984 from the electorate of Abhar. (2nd)

- Hassan Mousavipour

== 1988 ==
MP in 1988 from the electorate of Abhar. (3rd)

- Mostafa Morsali

== 1992 ==
MP in 1992 from the electorate of Abhar. (4th)

- Fazel Amir-Jahani

== 1996 ==
MP in 1996 from the electorate of Abhar. (5th)

- Ahmad Mahdavi Abhari

== 2000 ==
MP in 2000 from the electorate of Abhar and Khorramdarreh. (6th)

- Fazel Amir-Jahani

== 2004 ==
MP in 2004 from the electorate of Abhar and Khorramdarreh. (7th)

- Ahmad Mahdavi Abhari

== 2008 ==
MP in 2008 from the electorate of Abhar and Khorramdarreh. (8th)

- Ahmad Mahdavi Abhari

== 2012 ==
MP in 2012 from the electorate of Abhar and Khorramdarreh. (9th)

- Mohammad Reza Khanmohammadi

== 2016 ==
2016 Iranian legislative election
#	Candidate	List(s)	Votes	Run-offs
↓ Run-offs ↓
1	Mohammad Azizi	Independent politician	25,324	37,693
