= Qarzi, North Khorasan =

Village in North Khorasan province, Iran

Qarzi Persian: قارضي
- Village
- Location within Iran
- Coordinates: 36°43′39″N 57°58′44″E
- Country: Iran
- Province: North Khorasan
- County: Bam and Safiabad
- District: Central
- Rural District: Dahaneh-ye Shirin

Population (2016)
  - Total: 203
- Time zone: UTC+3:30 (IRST)

Qarzi (Persian: قارضي) (Note: Also romanized as Qārẕī and Qārzī) is a village in Dahaneh-ye Shirin Rural District of the Central District (Note: Formerly Bam and Safiabad District of Esfarayen County) in Bam and Safiabad County, North Khorasan province, Iran.

== Demographics ==
=== Population ===
At the time of the 2006 National Census, the village's population was 196 in 47 households, when it was in Safiabad Rural District of Bam and Safiabad District (Note: Renamed the Central District of Bam and Safiabad County) in Esfarayen County. The following census in 2011 counted 189 people in 56 households. The 2016 census measured the population of the village as 203 people in 60 households.

In 2023, the district was separated from the county in the establishment of Bam and Safiabad County and renamed the Central District. Qarzi was transferred to Dahaneh-ye Shirin Rural District created in the same district.
