= Qanbar Baghi =

Village in North Khorasan province, Iran

Qanbar Baghi Persian: قنبرباغي
- Village
- Location within Iran
- Coordinates: 36°43′29″N 58°01′58″E
- Country: Iran
- Province: North Khorasan
- County: Bam and Safiabad
- District: Central
- Rural District: Dahaneh-ye Shirin

Population (2016)
  - Total: 704
- Time zone: UTC+3:30 (IRST)

Qanbar Baghi (Persian: قنبرباغي) (Note: Also romanized as Qanbar Bāghī) is a village in Dahaneh-ye Shirin Rural District of the Central District (Note: Formerly Bam and Safiabad District of Esfarayen County) in Bam and Safiabad County, North Khorasan province, Iran.

== Demographics ==
=== Population ===
At the time of the 2006 National Census, the village's population was 817 in 223 households, when it was in Safiabad Rural District of Bam and Safiabad District (Note: Renamed the Central District of Bam and Safiabad County) in Esfarayen County. The following census in 2011 counted 847 people in 268 households. The 2016 census measured the population of the village as 704 people in 245 households, the most populous in its rural district.

In 2023, the district was separated from the county in the establishment of Bam and Safiabad County and renamed the Central District. Qanbar Baghi was transferred to Dahaneh-ye Shirin Rural District created in the same district.
