= Qaleh-ye Hoseyniyeh =

Village in Zanjan province, Iran

Qaleh-ye Hoseyniyeh Persian: قلعه حسينيه
- Village
- Location within Iran
- Coordinates: 36°14′48″N 49°10′07″E
- Country: Iran
- Province: Zanjan
- County: Khorramdarreh
- District: Central
- Rural District: Khorramdarreh

Population (2016)
  - Total: 2,534
- Time zone: UTC+3:30 (IRST)

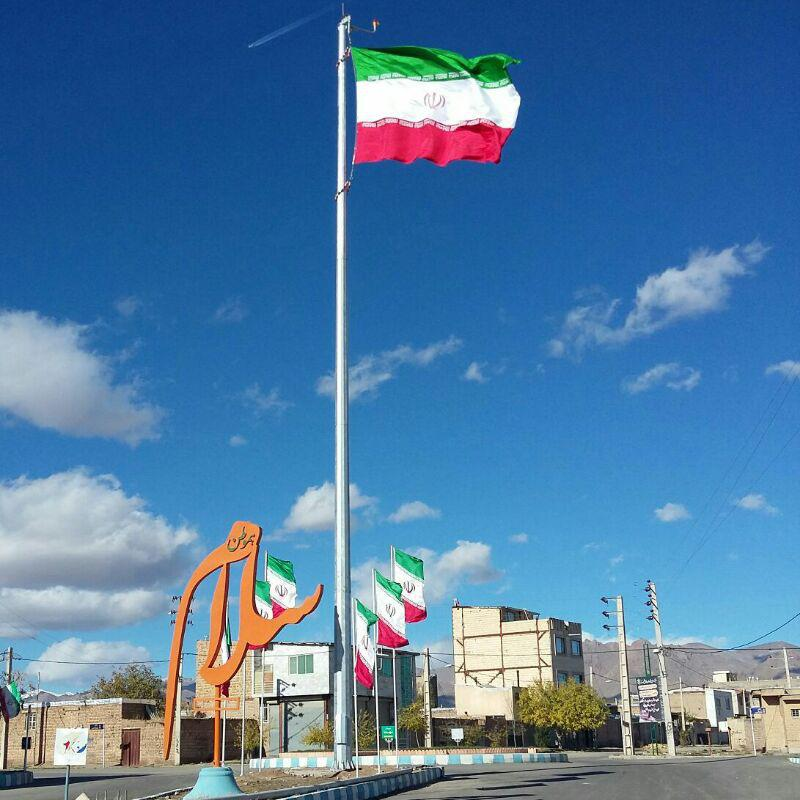
Husseini Castle

Qaleh-ye Hoseyniyeh (Persian: قلعه حسينيه) (Note: Also romanized as Qal‘eh-ye Ḩoseynīyeh) is a village in, and the capital of, Khorramdarreh Rural District in the Central District of Khorramdarreh County, Zanjan province, Iran.

== Demographics ==
=== Population ===
At the time of the 2006 National Census, the village's population was 1,963 in 490 households. The following census in 2011 counted 2,468 people in 698 households. The 2016 census measured the population of the village as 2,534 people in 787 households.
