= Esfid, North Khorasan =

Village in North Khorasan province, Iran

Esfid Persian: اسفيد
- Village
- Location within Iran
- Coordinates: 36°49′07″N 58°05′02″E
- Country: Iran
- Province: North Khorasan
- County: Bam and Safiabad
- District: Central
- Rural District: Dahaneh-ye Shirin

Population (2016)
  - Total: 625
- Time zone: UTC+3:30 (IRST)

Esfid (Persian: اسفيد) (Note: Also romanized as Esfīd) is a village in Dahaneh-ye Shirin Rural District of the Central District (Note: Formerly Bam and Safiabad District of Esfarayen County) in Bam and Safiabad County, North Khorasan province, Iran.

== Demographics ==
=== Population ===
At the time of the 2006 National Census, the village's population was 756 in 203 households, when it was in Safiabad Rural District of Bam and Safiabad District (Note: Renamed the Central District of Bam and Safiabad County) in Esfarayen County. The following census in 2011 counted 734 people in 203 households. The 2016 census measured the population of the village as 629 people in 197 households.

In 2023, the district was separated from the county in the establishment of Bam and Safiabad County and renamed the Central District. Esfid was transferred to Dahaneh-ye Shirin Rural District created in the same district.
