= Qarzi =

Qarzi or Qarezi (Persian: قارضي) may refer to:

- Qarzi, North Khorasan
- Qarzi Karji, North Khorasan Province

== See also ==
- Karz (disambiguation)
