= Nasirabad, Khorramdarreh =

Village in Zanjan province, Iran

Nasirabad Persian: نصيراباد
- Village
- Location within Iran
- Coordinates: 36°16′49″N 49°07′18″E
- Country: Iran
- Province: Zanjan
- County: Khorramdarreh
- District: Central
- Rural District: Khorramdarreh

Population (2016)
  - Total: 2,042
- Time zone: UTC+3:30 (IRST)

Nasirabad (Persian: نصيراباد) (Note: Also romanized as Naşīrābād; also known as Nāşerābād) is a village in Khorramdarreh Rural District of the Central District in Khorramdarreh County, Zanjan province, Iran.

== Demographics ==
=== Population ===
At the time of the 2006 National Census, the village's population was 2,044 in 473 households. The following census in 2011 counted 2,191 people in 609 households. The 2016 census measured the population of the village as 2,042 people in 613 households.
