= Qarzi Karji =

Village in North Khorasan province, Iran

Qarzi Karji Persian: قارضي كرجي
- Village
- Location within Iran
- Coordinates: 36°54′18″N 57°59′31″E
- Country: Iran
- Province: North Khorasan
- County: Bam and Safiabad
- District: Bam
- Rural District: Bam

Population (2016)
  - Total: 366
- Time zone: UTC+3:30 (IRST)

Qarzi Karji (Persian: قارضي كرجي) (Note: Also romanized as Qārẕī Karjī; also known as Qārẕī, Qārzī, and Qārzī Bām) is a village in Bam Rural District of Bam District in Bam and Safiabad County, North Khorasan province, Iran.

== Demographics ==
=== Population ===
At the time of the 2006 National Census, the village's population was 614 in 161 households, when it was in Bam and Safiabad District (Note: Renamed the Central District of Bam and Safiabad County) of Esfarayen County. The following census in 2011 counted 446 people in 144 households. The 2016 census measured the population of the village as 366 people in 134 households.

In 2023, the district was separated from the county in the establishment of Bam and Safiabad County and renamed the Central District. The rural district was transferred to the new Bam District.
