= Anjalin =

Village in Zanjan province, Iran

Anjalin Persian: انجلين
- Village
- Location within Iran
- Coordinates: 36°23′08″N 49°12′23″E
- Country: Iran
- Province: Zanjan
- County: Khorramdarreh
- District: Central
- Rural District: Alvand

Population (2016)
  - Total: 84
- Time zone: UTC+3:30 (IRST)

Anjalin (Persian: انجلين) (Note: Also romanized as Anjalīn and Anjelīn; also known as Anjalin Tarom Sofla, Anjīleyn, Anjīlīn, Īn Jal Īn, Indzhleun, Īnjel-e Īn, Īnjel Īn, and Injlein) is a village in Alvand Rural District of the Central District in Khorramdarreh County, Zanjan province, Iran.

== Demographics ==
=== Population ===
At the time of the 2006 National Census, the village's population was 148 in 33 households. The following census in 2011 counted 113 people in 29 households. The 2016 census measured the population of the village as 84 people in 21 households.
