= Neyab, North Khorasan =

Village in North Khorasan province, Iran

Neyab Persian: نياب
- Village
- Location within Iran
- Coordinates: 36°51′09″N 57°42′55″E
- Country: Iran
- Province: North Khorasan
- County: Bam and Safiabad
- District: Central
- Rural District: Safiabad

Population (2016)
  - Total: 87
- Time zone: UTC+3:30 (IRST)

Neyab (Persian: نياب) (Note: Also romanized as Neyāb) is a village in Safiabad Rural District of the Central District (Note: Formerly Bam and Safiabad District of Esfarayen County) in Bam and Safiabad County, North Khorasan province, Iran.

== Demographics ==
=== Population ===
At the time of the 2006 National Census, the village's population was 121 in 24 households, when it was in Bam and Safiabad District (Note: Renamed the Central District of Bam and Safiabad County) of Esfarayen County. The following census in 2011 counted 126 people in 25 households. The 2016 census measured the population of the village as 87 people in 21 households.

In 2023, the district was separated from the county in the establishment of Bam and Safiabad County and renamed the Central District.
