= Qarah Chah =

Village in North Khorasan province, Iran

Qarah Chah Persian: قره چاه
- Village
- Location within Iran
- Coordinates: 36°48′31″N 57°43′37″E
- Country: Iran
- Province: North Khorasan
- County: Bam and Safiabad
- District: Central
- Rural District: Safiabad

Population (2016)
  - Total: 351
- Time zone: UTC+3:30 (IRST)

Qarah Chah (Persian: قره چاه) (Note: Also romanized as Qarah Chāh) is a village in Safiabad Rural District of the Central District (Note: Formerly Bam and Safiabad District of Esfarayen County) in Bam and Safiabad County, North Khorasan province, Iran.

== Demographics ==
=== Population ===
At the time of the 2006 National Census, the village's population was 357 in 72 households, when it was in Bam and Safiabad District (Note: Renamed the Central District of Bam and Safiabad County) of Esfarayen County. The following census in 2011 counted 390 people in 89 households. The 2016 census measured the population of the village as 351 people in 103 households.

In 2023, the district was separated from the county in the establishment of Bam and Safiabad County and renamed the Central District.
