= Rahmatabad, Khorramdarreh =

Village in Zanjan province, Iran

Rahmatabad Persian: رحمت اباد
- Village
- Location within Iran
- Coordinates: 36°10′19″N 49°06′41″E
- Country: Iran
- Province: Zanjan
- County: Khorramdarreh
- District: Central
- Rural District: Khorramdarreh

Population (2016)
  - Total: 854
- Time zone: UTC+3:30 (IRST)

Rahmatabad (Persian: رحمت اباد) (Note: Also romanized as Raḩmatābād; also known as Kalekh-Rakhmatabad, Qal‘eh Raḩmatābād, and Qal‘eh-ye Raḩmatābād) is a village in Khorramdarreh Rural District of the Central District in Khorramdarreh County, Zanjan province, Iran.

== Demographics ==
=== Population ===
At the time of the 2006 National Census, the village's population was 872 in 208 households. The following census in 2011 counted 889 people in 254 households. The 2016 census measured the population of the village as 854 people in 267 households.
