= Eslamabad, Khorramdarreh =

Village in Zanjan province, Iran

Eslamabad Persian: اسلام اباد
- Village
- Location within Iran
- Coordinates: 36°22′22″N 49°14′41″E
- Country: Iran
- Province: Zanjan
- County: Khorramdarreh
- District: Central
- Rural District: Alvand

Population (2016)
  - Total: 63
- Time zone: UTC+3:30 (IRST)

Eslamabad (Persian: اسلام اباد) (Note: Also romanized as Eslāmābād; formerly known as Moghulabad (مغول‌آباد)) is a village in Alvand Rural District of the Central District in Khorramdarreh County, Zanjan province, Iran.

== Demographics ==
=== Population ===
At the time of the 2006 National Census, the village's population was 96 in 21 households. The following census in 2011 counted 57 people in 17 households. The 2016 census measured the population of the village as 63 people in 24 households.
