= Alast =

Alast (Persian: الست and Arabic) may refer to:

- Alast-e Olya
- Alast-e Sofla
- The "day of Alast" ("Am I not your Lord?” (a-lastu bi-rabbikum)), verse 172 of Sura 7 of the Quran: see Covenant (religion)#Islam
