= Su Kahriz =

Village in Zanjan province, Iran

Su Kahriz Persian: سوكهريز
- Village
- Location within Iran
- Coordinates: 36°12′25″N 49°05′00″E
- Country: Iran
- Province: Zanjan
- County: Khorramdarreh
- District: Central
- Rural District: Khorramdarreh

Population (2016)
  - Total: 2,560
- Time zone: UTC+3:30 (IRST)

Su Kahriz (Persian: سوكهريز) (Note: Also romanized as Sukahriz and Sūkahrīz; also known as Sokārīz, Sūkahrez, Sukakhrez, and Sūkārīz) is a village in Khorramdarreh Rural District of the Central District in Khorramdarreh County, Zanjan province, Iran.

== Demographics ==
=== Population ===
According to the 2006 National Census, the village had a population of 2,206 across 536 households. The 2011 census recorded 2,396 residents in 710 households, and the 2016 census further increased to 2,560 residents in 786 households. As of the latest census, it was the most populous village in its rural district.
