= Aghazadeh (disambiguation) =

Aghazadeh is a colloquialism in Iran and the Kurdistan region to describe the children of elite people.

Aghazadeh may also refer to:

== Locations ==
- Aqazadeh, Esfarayen County, North Khorasan Province, Iran
- Kalateh-ye Aqazadeh, Sabzevar County, Razavi Khorasan Province, Iran
- Aghazadeh Mansion, a mansion located in Abarkooh, Iran

== Other ==
- Aghazadeh (TV series), an Iranian TV series
- Gholam Reza Aghazadeh, Iranian politician
