= Bam, Bam and Safiabad =

Village in North Khorasan province, Iran

Bam Persian: بام
- Village
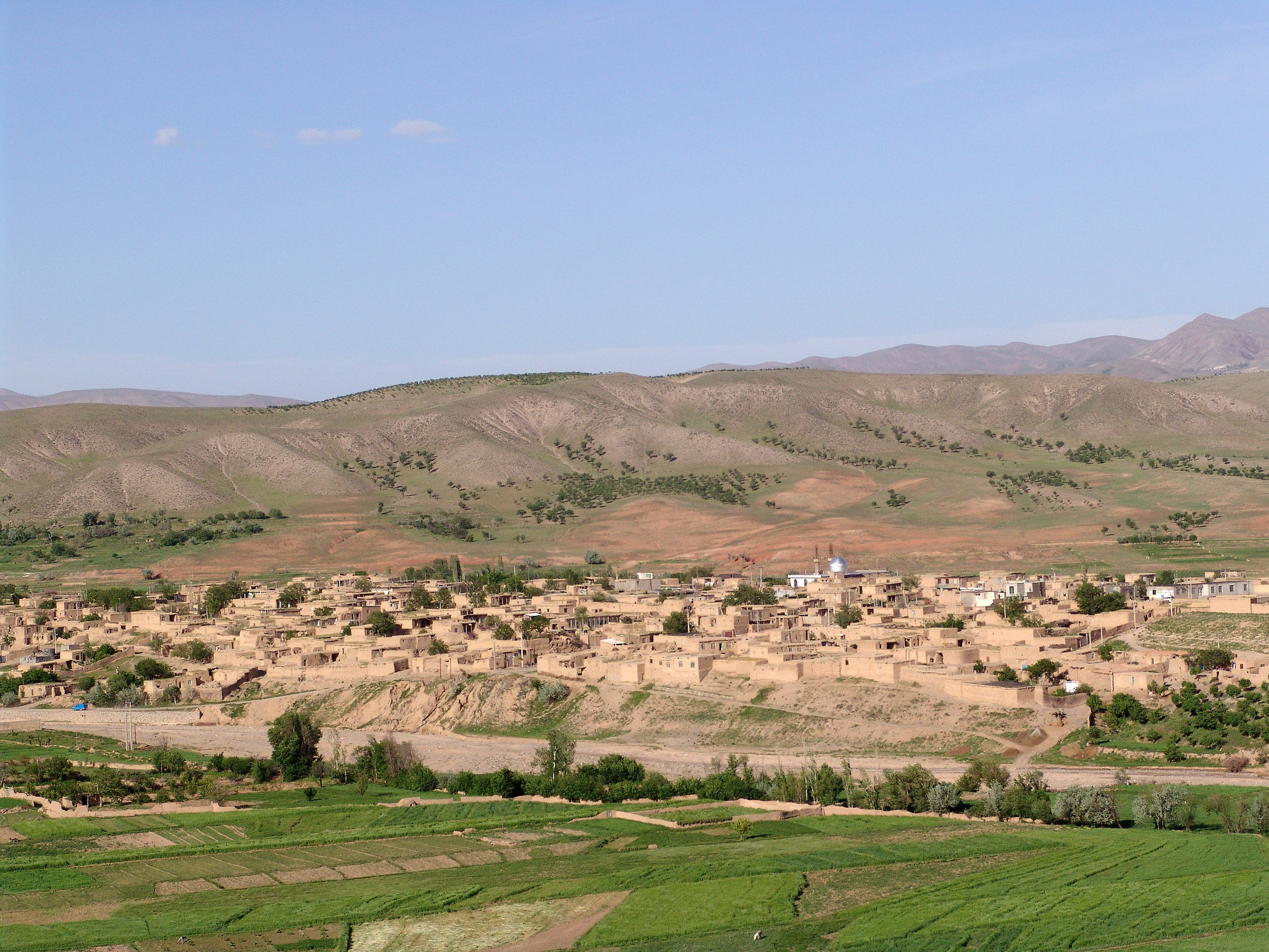
- The village of Bam

- Location within Iran
- Coordinates: 36°54′18″N 57°56′16″E
- Country: Iran
- Province: North Khorasan
- County: Bam and Safiabad
- District: Bam
- Rural District: Bam

Population (2016)
  - Total: 1,368
- Time zone: UTC+3:30 (IRST)

Bam (Persian: بام) (Note: Also romanized as Bām) is a village in Bam Rural District of Bam District in Bam and Safiabad County, North Khorasan province, Iran, serving as capital of both the district and the rural district.

== Demographics ==
=== Population ===
At the time of the 2006 National Census, the village's population was 1,474 in 481 households, when it was in Bam and Safiabad District (Note: Renamed the Central District of Bam and Safiabad County) of Esfarayen County. The following census in 2011 counted 1,582 people in 507 households. The 2016 census measured the population of the village as 1,368 people in 492 households, the most populous in its rural district.

In 2022, a routine road construction project led to the accidental discovery of an extensive network of underground corridors in Bam village. Archaeologists have linked the discovery to the nearby fortress of Shahr-e Belqeys (City of Belqeys). Shahr-e Belqeys was prosperous during a period from the late Sassanid era to early Islamic times. The total length of those corridors is 18 km, and there is a bathroom and a mill on the way, which has not been opened yet.

In 2023, the district was separated from the county in the establishment of Bam and Safiabad County and renamed the Central District. The rural district was transferred to the new Bam District.
