= Gombardi =

Village in North Khorasan province, Iran

Gombardi Persian: گمبردي
- Village
- Location within Iran
- Coordinates: 36°48′11″N 57°47′26″E
- Country: Iran
- Province: North Khorasan
- County: Bam and Safiabad
- District: Central
- Rural District: Safiabad

Population (2016)
  - Total: 12
- Time zone: UTC+3:30 (IRST)

Gombardi (Persian: گمبردي) (Note: Also romanized as Gombardī) is a village in Safiabad Rural District of the Central District (Note: Formerly Bam and Safiabad District of Esfarayen County) in Bam and Safiabad County, North Khorasan province, Iran.

== Demographics ==
=== Population ===
The village did not appear in the 2006 and 2011 National Censuses, when it was in Bam and Safiabad District (Note: Renamed the Central District of Bam and Safiabad County) of Esfarayen County. The 2016 census measured the population of the village as 12 people in four households.

In 2023, the district was separated from the county in the establishment of Bam and Safiabad County and renamed the Central District.
