= Shevir, Zanjan =

Village in Zanjan province, Iran

Shevir Persian: شوير
- Village
- Location within Iran
- Coordinates: 36°14′21″N 49°05′20″E
- Country: Iran
- Province: Zanjan
- County: Khorramdarreh
- District: Central
- Rural District: Khorramdarreh

Population (2016)
  - Total: 1,850
- Time zone: UTC+3:30 (IRST)

Shevir (Persian: شوير) (Note: Also romanized as Shavīr and Shevīr; also known as Chavir and Javīr) is a village in Khorramdarreh Rural District of the Central District in Khorramdarreh County, Zanjan province, Iran.

== Demographics ==
=== Population ===
At the time of the 2006 National Census, the village's population was 1,631 in 305 households. The following census in 2011 counted 1,816 people in 487 households. The 2016 census measured the population of the village as 1,850 people in 545 households.
