= Esfid =

Esfid (Persian: اسفيد) may refer to:

- Esfid, North Khorasan
- Esfid, Qom
