= Mangeli-ye Sofla =

Village in North Khorasan province, Iran

Mangeli-ye Sofla Persian: منگلي سفلي
- Village
- Location within Iran
- Coordinates: 36°44′30″N 57°42′58″E
- Country: Iran
- Province: North Khorasan
- County: Bam and Safiabad
- District: Central
- Rural District: Safiabad

Population (2016)
  - Total: 37
- Time zone: UTC+3:30 (IRST)

Mangeli-ye Sofla (Persian: منگلي سفلي) (Note: Also romanized as Mangelī-ye Soflá; also known as Aḩmadābād Mangelī, Aḩmadābād-e Mangelīābād-e Pā’īn, Aḩmadābād Mangelī Pā’īn, Aḩmadābād Mangelī-ye Pā’īn, and Mangalī-ye Pā’īn) is a village in Safiabad Rural District of the Central District (Note: Formerly Bam and Safiabad District of Esfarayen County) in Bam and Safiabad County, North Khorasan province, Iran.

== Demographics ==
=== Population ===
At the time of the 2006 National Census, the village's population was 59 in 10 households, when it was in Bam and Safiabad District (Note: Renamed the Central District of Bam and Safiabad County) of Esfarayen County. The following census in 2011 counted 69 people in 16 households. The 2016 census measured the population of the village as 37 people in 13 households.

In 2023, the district was separated from the county in the establishment of Bam and Safiabad County and renamed the Central District.
