= Mangeli-ye Olya =

Village in North Khorasan province, Iran

Mangeli-ye Olya Persian: منگلي عليا
- Village
- Location within Iran
- Coordinates: 36°45′54″N 57°44′26″E
- Country: Iran
- Province: North Khorasan
- County: Bam and Safiabad
- District: Central
- Rural District: Safiabad

Population (2016)
  - Total: 151
- Time zone: UTC+3:30 (IRST)

Mangeli-ye Olya (Persian: منگلي عليا) (Note: Also romanized as Mangelī-ye ‘Olyā; also known as Abād Mangelī, Esmā‘īlābād-e Mangalī, Esmā‘īlābād-e Mangalī-ye Bālā, Esmātl Ābād-e Mang Alī, Mangalī-ye Bālā, Mangelī, and Mangili) is a village in Safiabad Rural District of the Central District (Note: Formerly Bam and Safiabad District of Esfarayen County) in Bam and Safiabad County, North Khorasan province, Iran.

== Demographics ==
=== Population ===
At the time of the 2006 National Census, the village's population was 227 in 54 households, when it was in Bam and Safiabad District (Note: Renamed the Central District of Bam and Safiabad County) of Esfarayen County. The following census in 2011 counted 206 people in 53 households. The 2016 census measured the population of the village as 151 people in 49 households.

In 2023, the district was separated from the county in the establishment of Bam and Safiabad County and renamed the Central District.
