= Palas, Iran =

Village in Zanjan province, Iran

Palas Persian: پلاس
- Village
- Location within Iran
- Coordinates: 36°17′59″N 49°11′10″E
- Country: Iran
- Province: Zanjan
- County: Khorramdarreh
- District: Central
- Rural District: Alvand

Population (2016)
  - Total: 116
- Time zone: UTC+3:30 (IRST)

Palas (Persian: پلاس) (Note: Also romanized as Palās, Pālās, Pelās, and Pelas; also known as Pakas and Pilās) is a village in Alvand Rural District of the Central District in Khorramdarreh County, Zanjan province, Iran.

== Demographics ==
=== Population ===
At the time of the 2006 National Census, the village's population was 119 in 27 households. The following census in 2011 counted 117 people in 28 households. The 2016 census measured the population of the village as 116 people in 30 households.
