= Sarigol Rural District =

Rural district in North Khorasan province, Iran

Sarigol Rural District Persian: دهستان ساریگل
- Rural District
- Location within Iran
- Coordinates: 36°54′N 57°48′E
- Country: Iran
- Province: North Khorasan
- County: Bam and Safibad
- District: Bam
- Established: 2023
- Capital: Dahaneh-ye Ojaq
- Time zone: UTC+3:30 (IRST)

Sarigol Rural District (Persian: دهستان ساریگل) is in Bam District of Bam and Safiabad County, North Khorasan province, Iran. Its capital is the village of Dahaneh-ye Ojaq, whose population at the time of the 2016 National Census was 1,046 people in 345 households.

== History ==
In 2023, Bam and Safiabad District (Note: Renamed the Central District of Bam and Safiabad County) was separated from Esfarayen County in the establishment of Bam and Safiabad County and renamed the Central District. Sarigol Rural District was created in the new Bam District.

== Other villages in the rural district ==
- Ardin
- Baba Qodrat
- Bani Dar
- Bekrabad
- Chahar Mast
- Dastjerd
- Isa Bagh
- Jahan
- Karizdar
- Kushkandar
- Zali
