= Mohammad Reza Khanmohammadi =

Iranian academic and politician

Mohammad Reza Khanmohammadi Khorrami
- محمدرضا خان محمدی خرمی

member of Islamic Consultative Assembly
- In office 2012–2016
- Constituency: Abhar and Khorramdarreh (electoral district)

Personal details
- Born: 1964 (age 61–62) Khorramdarreh, Iran
- Party: People's Voice
- Education: PHD from Shahid Beheshti University

Mohammad Reza Khanmohammadi Khorrami (Persian: ‌‌محمدرضا خان محمدی خرمی; born 1964) is an Iranian academic and politician.

Khanmohammadi Khorrami was born in Khorramdarreh, Zanjan Province. He is a member of the present Islamic Consultative Assembly from the electorate of Khorramdarreh and Abhar. Khanmohammadi Khorrami won with 52,339 (44.36%) votes.
