= Falaj, Zanjan =

Village in Zanjan province, Iran

Falaj Persian: فلج
- Village
- Location within Iran
- Coordinates: 36°11′32″N 49°02′39″E
- Country: Iran
- Province: Zanjan
- County: Khorramdarreh
- District: Central
- Rural District: Khorramdarreh

Population (2016)
  - Total: 654
- Time zone: UTC+3:30 (IRST)

Falaj (Persian: فلج) (Note: Also romanized as Falaj and Falj; also known as Pal, Palḩ, and Palk) is a village in Khorramdarreh Rural District of the Central District in Khorramdarreh County, Zanjan province, Iran.

== Demographics ==
=== Population ===
At the time of the 2006 National Census, the village's population was 722 in 149 households. The following census in 2011 counted 709 people in 212 households. The 2016 census measured the population of the village as 654 people in 206 households.
