= Alast-e Sofla =

Village in North Khorasan province, Iran

Alast-e Sofla Persian: الست سفلي
- Village
- Location within Iran
- Coordinates: 36°44′41″N 57°51′03″E
- Country: Iran
- Province: North Khorasan
- County: Bam and Safiabad
- District: Central
- Rural District: Safiabad

Population (2016)
  - Total: 399
- Time zone: UTC+3:30 (IRST)

Alast-e Sofla (Persian: الست سفلي) (Note: Also romanized as Alast-e Soflá; also known as Alast Pā’īn and Alast-e Pā’īn) is a village in Safiabad Rural District of the Central District (Note: Formerly Bam and Safiabad District of Esfarayen County) in Bam and Safiabad County, North Khorasan province, Iran.

== Demographics ==
=== Population ===
At the time of the 2006 National Census, the village's population was 448 in 116 households, when it was in Bam and Safiabad District (Note: Renamed the Central District of Bam and Safiabad County) of Esfarayen County. The following census in 2011 counted 492 people in 129 households. The 2016 census measured the population of the village as 399 people in 120 households.

In 2023, the district was separated from the county in the establishment of Bam and Safiabad County and renamed the Central District.
