= Falaj (disambiguation) =

Falaj is a type of irrigation system in Oman.

Falaj or Falj may also refer to:

- Falaj, Zanjan, a village in Iran
