= Pilas =

Pilas can refer to:

- Las Pilas, volcano in Nicaragua
- Pilas Island in the Sulu Archipelago, Philippines
- Pilas, Iran, Zanjan Province, Iran
- Pilas, Seville, Andalucia, Spain
