= Elvend =

Elvend may refer to:

- Əlvənd, Azerbaijan
- Elvend, Iran
