= Vistan-e Pain =

Village in Zanjan province, Iran

Vistan-e Pain Persian: ويستان پائين
- Village
- Location within Iran
- Coordinates: 36°16′16″N 49°14′34″E
- Country: Iran
- Province: Zanjan
- County: Khorramdarreh
- District: Central
- Rural District: Khorramdarreh

Population (2016)
  - Total: 59
- Time zone: UTC+3:30 (IRST)

Vistan-e Pain (Persian: ويستان پائين) (Note: Also romanized as Veyestān-e Pā’īn, Vīstān-e Pā’īn, and Wistān Pāīn; also known as Wistān) is a village in Khorramdarreh Rural District of the Central District in Khorramdarreh County, Zanjan province, Iran.

== Demographics ==
=== Population ===
At the time of the 2006 National Census, the village's population was 32 in 12 households. The following census in 2011 counted 46 people in 15 households. The 2016 census measured the population of the village as 59 people in 21 households.
