= Alast-e Olya =

Village in North Khorasan province, Iran

Alast-e Olya Persian: الست عليا
- Village
- Location within Iran
- Coordinates: 36°45′35″N 57°50′32″E
- Country: Iran
- Province: North Khorasan
- County: Bam and Safiabad
- District: Central
- Rural District: Safiabad

Population (2016)
  - Total: 559
- Time zone: UTC+3:30 (IRST)

Alast-e Olya (Persian: الست عليا) (Note: Also Romanized as Alast-e ‘Olyā; also known as ‘Alās, Alast, Alast Bālā, and Alast-e Bālā) is a village in, and the capital of, Safiabad Rural District in the Central District (Note: Formerly Bam and Safiabad District of Esfarayen County) of Bam and Safiabad County, North Khorasan province, Iran. The previous capital of the rural district was the village of Safiabad, now a city.

== Demographics ==
=== Population ===
At the time of the 2006 National Census, the village's population was 673 in 148 households, when it was in Bam and Safiabad District (Note: Renamed the Central District of Bam and Safiabad County) of Esfarayen County. The following census in 2011 counted 652 people in 178 households. The 2016 census measured the population of the village as 559 people in 175 households.

In 2023, the district was separated from the county in the establishment of Bam and Safiabad County and renamed the Central District.
