= Estakhr-e Deraz =

Estakhr-e Deraz (Persian: استخردراز) may refer to:

- Estakhr-e Deraz, Kerman
- Estakhr-e Deraz, South Khorasan
