= Vistan-e Bala =

Village in Zanjan province, Iran

Vistan-e Bala Persian: ويستان بالا
- Village
- Location within Iran
- Coordinates: 36°17′09″N 49°14′46″E
- Country: Iran
- Province: Zanjan
- County: Khorramdarreh
- District: Central
- Rural District: Khorramdarreh

Population (2016)
  - Total: 107
- Time zone: UTC+3:30 (IRST)

Vistan-e Bala (Persian: ويستان بالا) (Note: Also romanized as Veyestān-e Bālā, Vistan-Bala, Vīstān-e Bālā, and Wistān Bāla; also known as Veyestān) is a village in Khorramdarreh Rural District of the Central District in Khorramdarreh County, Zanjan province, Iran.

== Demographics ==
=== Population ===
At the time of the 2006 National Census, the village's population was 103 in 29 households. The following census in 2011 counted 48 people in 17 households. The 2016 census measured the population of the village as 107 people in 34 households.
