= Karz =

Karz or KARZ may refer to:

== Films ==
- Karz (film), a 1980 Indian Hindi-language thriller film by Subhash Ghai, starring Rishi Kapoor and Simi Garewal
- Karz: The Burden of Truth, a 2002 Indian Hindi-language drama film by Harry Baweja, starring Sunny Deol and Shilpa Shetty
- Karzzzz, a 2008 Indian Hindi-language thriller film by Satish Kuashik starring Himesh Reshamiya and Urmila Matondkar, remake of the 1980 film

== Places ==
- Karz, Kandahar, a village in Kandahar Province, Afghanistan

== Radio and TV stations ==
- KARZ (FM), a radio station (99.7 FM) licensed to Marshall, Minnesota, United States
- KARZ-TV, a television station (channel 28, virtual 42) licensed to Little Rock, Arkansas, United States
- KKCK, a radio station (94.7 FM) licensed to Springfield, Minnesota, which held the call sign KARZ from 2017 to 2019
- KNSG (FM), a radio station (107.5 FM) licensed to Marshall, Minnesota, which held the call sign KARZ from 1997 to 2017

== See also ==
- Qarzi (disambiguation)
