= Alvand, Zanjan =

Village in Zanjan province, Iran

Alvand Persian: الوند
- Village
- Location within Iran
- Coordinates: 36°19′06″N 49°10′04″E
- Country: Iran
- Province: Zanjan
- County: Khorramdarreh
- District: Central
- Rural District: Alvand

Population (2016)
  - Total: 380
- Time zone: UTC+3:30 (IRST)

Alvand (Persian: الوند) (Note: Also romanized as Alwand and El’vend; also known as Alband) is a village in, and the capital of, Alvand Rural District in the Central District of Khorramdarreh County, Zanjan province, Iran.

== Demographics ==
=== Population ===
At the time of the 2006 National Census, the village's population was 430 in 85 households. The following census in 2011 counted 362 people in 101 households. The 2016 census measured the population of the village as 380 people in 126 households. It was the most populous village in its rural district.
