= Alvand Rural District =

Alvand Rural District (Persian: دهستان الوند) may refer to:

- Alvand Rural District (Qasr-e Shirin County), West Azerbaijan province
- Alvand Rural District (Khorramdarreh County), Zanjan province
