= Ardajin =

Village in Zanjan province, Iran

Ardajin Persian: اردجين
- Village
- Location within Iran
- Coordinates: 36°13′23″N 49°00′56″E
- Country: Iran
- Province: Zanjan
- County: Khorramdarreh
- District: Central
- Rural District: Khorramdarreh

Population (2016)
  - Total: 1,008
- Time zone: UTC+3:30 (IRST)

Ardajin (Persian: اردجين) (Note: Also romanized as Ardajīn and Ardjīn; also known as Ardahīn and Ardin) is a village in Khorramdarreh Rural District of the Central District in Khorramdarreh County, Zanjan province, Iran.

== Demographics ==
=== Population ===
At the time of the 2006 National Census, the village's population was 1,177 in 286 households. The following census in 2011 counted 1,047 people in 308 households. The 2016 census measured the population of the village as 1,008 people in 325 households.
