= Dahaneh-ye Shirin Rural District =

Rural district in North Khorasan province, Iran

Dahaneh-ye Shirin Rural District Persian: دهستان دهنه شیرین
- Rural District
- Location within Iran
- Coordinates: 36°44′N 58°03′E
- Country: Iran
- Province: North Khorasan
- County: Bam and Safiabad
- District: Central
- Established: 2023
- Capital: Dahaneh-ye Shirin
- Time zone: UTC+3:30 (IRST)

Dahaneh-ye Shirin Rural District (Persian: دهستان دهنه شیرین) is in the Central District (Note: Formerly Bam and Safiabad District of Esfarayen County) of Bam and Safiabad County, North Khorasan province, Iran. Its capital is the village of Dahaneh-ye Shirin, whose population at the time of the 2016 National Census was 551 people in 175 households.

== History ==
In 2023, Bam and Safiabad District (Note: Renamed the Central District of Bam and Safiabad County) was separated from Esfarayen County in the establishment of Bam and Safiabad County and renamed the Central District. Dahaneh-ye Shirin Rural District was created in the same district.

== Other villages in the rural district ==
- Abbasabad
- Bagheshjerd
- Esfid
- Gesk
- Jowzaqeh
- Maqsudabad
- Qanbar Baghi
- Qarzi
- Ravokh
- Zanaft
