= Alvand Rural District (Khorramdarreh County) =

Rural district in Zanjan province, Iran

Alvand Rural District Persian: دهستان الوند
- Rural District
- Location within Iran
- Coordinates: 36°21′N 49°13′E
- Country: Iran
- Province: Zanjan
- County: Khorramdarreh
- District: Central
- Established: 1997
- Capital: Alvand

Population (2016)
  - Total: 691
- Time zone: UTC+3:30 (IRST)

Alvand Rural District (Persian: دهستان الوند) is in the Central District of Khorramdarreh County, Zanjan province, Iran. Its capital is the village of Alvand.

== Demographics ==
=== Population ===
At the time of the 2006 National Census, the rural district's population was 873 in 188 households. There were 698 inhabitants in 189 households at the following census of 2011. The 2016 census measured the population of the rural district as 691 in 214 households. The most populous of its seven villages was Alvand, with 380 people.

=== Other villages in the rural district ===
- Anjalin
- Eslamabad
- Khalifehlu
- Palas
