= Mangeli, Hormozgan =

Mangeli منگلي
- Village
- Location within Iran
- Coordinates: 26°07′42″N 57°13′36″E
- Country: Iran
- Province: Hormozgan
- County: Minab
- Bakhsh: Byaban
- Rural District: Byaban

Population (2006)
  - Total: 155
- Time zone: UTC+3:30 (IRST)
  - Summer (DST): UTC+4:30 (IRDT)

Mangeli (Persian: منگلي, also Romanized as Mangelī) is a village in Byaban Rural District, Byaban District, Minab County, Hormozgan Province, Iran. At the 2006 census, its population was 155, in 28 families.
