= Alwandi =

- village
- Country: India
- State: Karnataka
- District: Koppal
- Talukas: Koppal

Government
  - Body: Gram panchayat

Population (2018)
  - Total: 11,200

Languages Kannada
  - Official: Kannada
- Time zone: UTC+5:30 (IST)
- PIN: 583226
- ISO 3166 code: IN-KA
- Vehicle registration: KA 37
- Website: karnataka.gov.in

Alwandi is a village in the southern state of Karnataka, India. It is located in the Koppal taluk of Koppal district in Karnataka.

== Demographics ==
As of 2001 India census, Alwandi had a population of 11200 with 5980 males and 5220 females.

== See also ==
- Koppal
- Districts of Karnataka
