= Kalateh-ye Aqazadeh =

Kalateh-ye Aqazadeh كلاته اقازاده
- Village
- Location within Iran
- Coordinates: 36°13′56″N 57°38′40″E
- Country: Iran
- Province: Razavi Khorasan
- County: Sabzevar
- Bakhsh: Central
- Rural District: Qasabeh-ye Gharbi

Population (2006)
  - Total: 113
- Time zone: UTC+3:30 (IRST)
  - Summer (DST): UTC+4:30 (IRDT)

Kalateh-ye Aqazadeh (Persian: كلاته اقازاده, also Romanized as Kalāteh-ye Āqāzādeh) is a village in Qasabeh-ye Gharbi Rural District, in the Central District of Sabzevar County, Razavi Khorasan Province, Iran. At the 2006 census, its population was 113, in 35 families.
