= Safiabad, North Khorasan =

City in North Khorasan province, Iran

Safiabad Persian: صفی‌آباد
- City
- Location within Iran
- Coordinates: 36°41′46″N 57°55′41″E
- Country: Iran
- Province: North Khorasan
- County: Bam and Safiabad
- District: Central
- Established as a city: 2000

Population (2016)
  - Total: 3,427
- Time zone: UTC+3:30 (IRST)

Safiabad (Persian: صفی‌آباد) (Note: Also romanized as Safīābād) is a city in the Central District (Note: Formerly Bam and Safiabad District of Esfarayen County) of Bam and Safiabad County, North Khorasan province, Iran, serving as capital of both the county and the district. It was the administrative center for Safiabad Rural District until its capital was transferred to the village of Alast-e Olya. Safiabad was converted to a city in 2000.

== Demographics ==
=== Population ===
At the time of the 2006 National Census, the city's population was 3,047 in 885 households, when it was in Bam and Safiabad District (Note: Renamed the Central District of Bam and Safiabad County) of Esfarayen County. The following census in 2011 counted 3,527 people in 995 households. The 2016 census measured the population of the city as 3,427 people in 1,020 households.

In 2023, the district was separated from the county in the establishment of Bam and Safiabad County and renamed the Central District, with Safiabad as the new county's capital.
