= Vistən =

- Municipality
- Location within Azerbaijan
- Coordinates: 38°49′39″N 48°29′45″E
- Country: Azerbaijan
- Rayon: Lerik

Population
  - Total: 926
- Time zone: UTC+4 (AZT)
  - Summer (DST): UTC+5 (AZT)

Vistən (also, Vistan) is a village and municipality in the Lerik Rayon of Azerbaijan. It has a population of 926.
