= Khorramdarreh Rural District =

Rural district in Zanjan province, Iran

Khorramdarreh Rural District Persian: دهستان خرمدره
- Rural District
- Location within Iran
- Coordinates: 36°14′N 49°06′E
- Country: Iran
- Province: Zanjan
- County: Khorramdarreh
- District: Central
- Established: 1987
- Capital: Qaleh-ye Hoseyniyeh

Population (2016)
  - Total: 11,892
- Time zone: UTC+3:30 (IRST)

Khorramdarreh Rural District (Persian: دهستان خرمدره) is in the Central District of Khorramdarreh County, Zanjan province, Iran. Its capital is the village of Qaleh-ye Hoseyniyeh.

== Demographics ==
=== Population ===
At the time of the 2006 National Census, the rural district's population was 11,099 in 2,567 households. There were 11,920 inhabitants in 3,414 households at the following census of 2011. The 2016 census measured the population of the rural district as 11,892 in 3,656 households. The most populous of its 19 villages was Su Kahriz, with 2,560 people.

=== Other villages in the rural district ===
- Ardajin
- Bagh Darreh
- Falaj
- Khalaj
- Nasirabad
- Rahmatabad
- Shevir
- Vistan-e Bala
- Vistan-e Pain
