= Alvand, South Khorasan =

Alvand الوند
- village
- Location within Iran
- Coordinates: 31°45′00″N 59°52′44″E
- Country: Iran
- Province: South Khorasan
- County: Nehbandan
- Bakhsh: Central
- Rural District: Neh

Population (2016)
  - Total: 61
- Time zone: UTC+3:30 (IRST)
  - Summer (DST): UTC+4:30 (IRDT)

Alvand (Persian: الوند, also Romanized as Alwand) is a village in Neh Rural District, in the Central District of Nehbandan County, South Khorasan Province, Iran. At the 2016 census, its population was 61, in 26 families.
