= Alvand Qoli =

Alvand Qoli الوندقلي
- Village
- Location within Iran
- Coordinates: 35°56′40″N 47°31′30″E
- Country: Iran
- Province: Kurdistan
- County: Bijar
- Bakhsh: Central
- Rural District: Howmeh

Population (2006)
  - Total: 117
- Time zone: UTC+3:30 (IRST)
  - Summer (DST): UTC+4:30 (IRDT)

Alvand Qoli (Persian: الوندقلي, also Romanized as Alvand Qolī; also known as Alvanq Quli and Alwand Quli) is a village in Howmeh Rural District, in the Central District of Bijar County, Kurdistan province, Iran. At the 2006 census, its population was 117, in 26 families. The village is populated by Kurds.
