= Ardin, Zanjan =

Village in Zanjan province, Iran

Ardin Persian: اردين
- Village
- Location within Iran
- Coordinates: 36°31′42″N 48°36′36″E
- Country: Iran
- Province: Zanjan
- County: Zanjan
- District: Central
- Rural District: Bonab

Population (2016)
  - Total: 127
- Time zone: UTC+3:30 (IRST)

Ardin (Persian: اردين) (Note: Also romanized as Ardīn) is a village in Bonab Rural District of the Central District in Zanjan County, Zanjan province, Iran.

== Demographics ==
=== Population ===
At the time of the 2006 National Census, the village's population was 154 in 33 households. The following census in 2011 counted 138 people in 35 households. The 2016 census measured the population of the village as 127 people in 40 households.
