= Khorramdarreh, Kerman =

Khorramdarreh, Iran خرمدره
- Village
- Location within Iran
- Coordinates: 30°24′45″N 55°00′01″E
- Country: Iran
- Province: Kerman
- County: Shahr-e Babak
- Bakhsh: Central
- Rural District: Madvarat

Population (2006)
  - Total: 13
- Time zone: UTC+3:30 (IRST)

Khorramdarreh (Persian: خرمدره; also known as Estakhr-e Derāz, Khowrmowdīyeh, and Khowrmowdūyeh) is a village in Madvarat Rural District, in the Central District of Shahr-e Babak County, Kerman Province, Iran. According to the 2006 census, its population was 13, in 6 families.
