= Khorramdarreh =

City in Zanjan province, Iran

Khorramdarreh Persian: خرمدره
- City
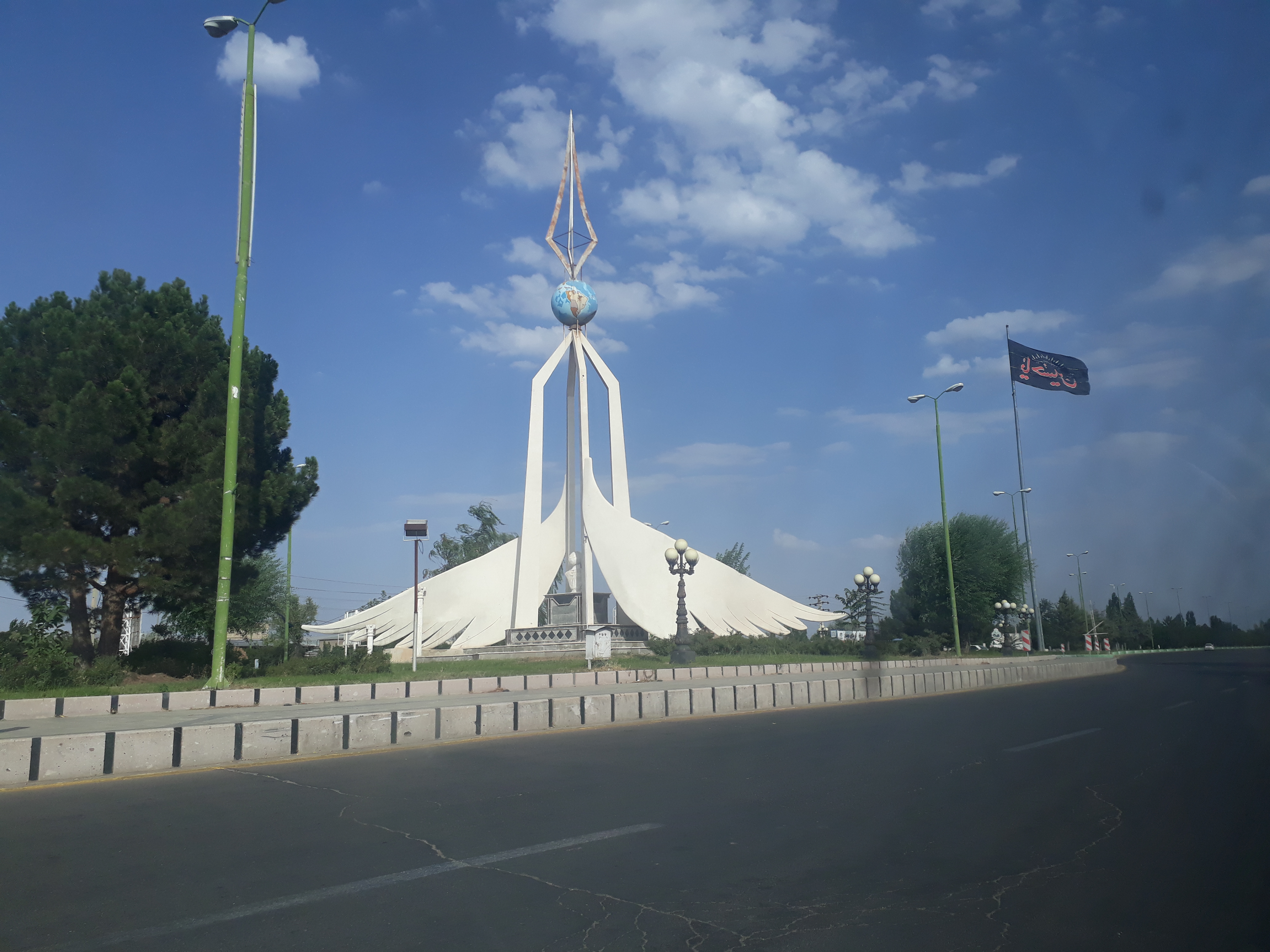
- Moallem Square in the city of Khorramdarreh

- Location within Iran
- Coordinates: 36°12′22″N 49°12′01″E
- Country: Iran
- Province: Zanjan
- County: Khorramdarreh
- District: Central

Population (2016)
  - Total: 68,121
- Time zone: UTC+3:30 (IRST)

Khorramdarreh (Persian: خرمدره) (Note: Also romanized as Khorram Darreh, Khorramdareh, and Khorramdarreh; also known as Khorramdarrekh) is a city in the Central District of Khorramdarreh County, Zanjan province, Iran, serving as capital of both the county and the district. The city has the highest literacy rate in Zanjan province.

Khorramdarreh is the home of Minoo Industrial Group (Food Holding) which was founded by Ali Khosroshahi, grandfather of Dara Khosroshahi. The people of Khorramdarreh are mainly active in the agriculture sector, and the city has an industrial estate located near the Qazvin–Zanjan highway.

== Climate ==
Climate data for Khorramdareh (elevation:1,575.0 m (5,167.3 ft)), 1986-2010 normals
Month	Jan	Feb	Mar	Apr	May	Jun	Jul	Aug	Sep	Oct	Nov	Dec	Year
Daily mean °C (°F)	−0.8 (30.6)	1.1 (34.0)	6.1 (43.0)	11.8 (53.2)	16.2 (61.2)	21.1 (70.0)	23.8 (74.8)	23.6 (74.5)	19.5 (67.1)	14.0 (57.2)	7.3 (45.1)	2.0 (35.6)	12.1 (53.9)
Mean daily minimum °C (°F)	−5.3 (22.5)	−3.7 (25.3)	0.4 (32.7)	5.4 (41.7)	9.2 (48.6)	13.3 (55.9)	16.1 (61.0)	15.7 (60.3)	11.3 (52.3)	6.9 (44.4)	1.7 (35.1)	−2.6 (27.3)	5.7 (42.3)
Average precipitation mm (inches)	30.3 (1.19)	32.5 (1.28)	47.1 (1.85)	48.3 (1.90)	31.0 (1.22)	5.8 (0.23)	2.9 (0.11)	3.0 (0.12)	1.7 (0.07)	21.4 (0.84)	37.9 (1.49)	33.9 (1.33)	295.8 (11.63)
Source: IRIMO

== Demographics ==
=== Population ===
At the time of the 2006 National Census, the city's population was 48,055 in 12,562 households. The following census in 2011 counted 52,548 people in 15,307 households. The 2016 census measured the population of the city as 68,121 people in 20,345 households.

== Archaeology ==
Khorramdarreh has the province's oldest and most significant human civilization remainders in Tappe-Khalese (Khalese Hill) from 6000 B.C. located on the south side of the city within gardens.

== Economy ==
=== Agricultural products ===
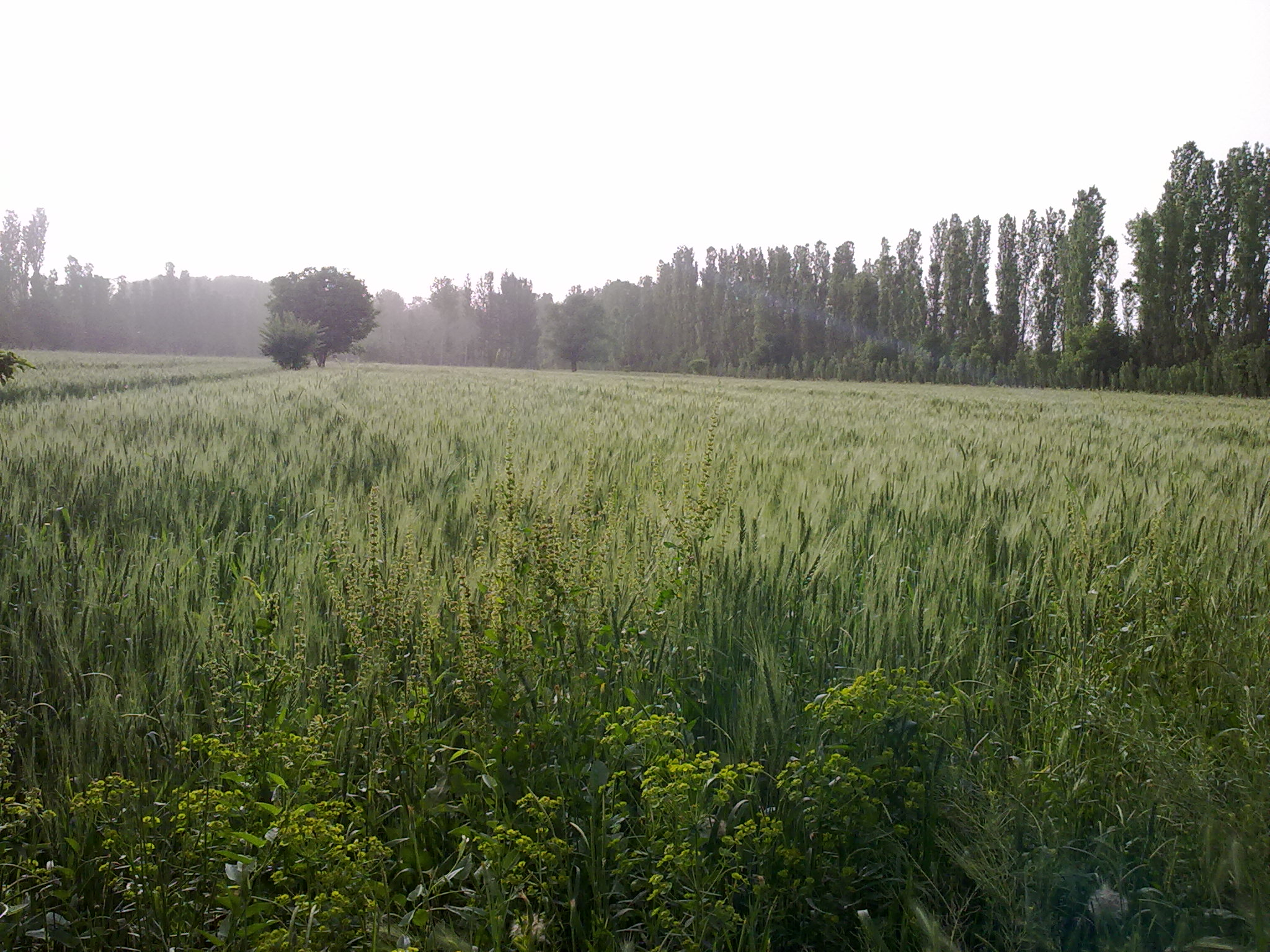
Khorramdarreh wheat farms

Agricultural products and fruits that are exported abroad and also distributed all over country are included and white pinto beans; varieties of grapes, raisins and grape syrup; walnuts, wheat; varieties of apple, pear, apricot, cherry, and sour cherry; cow's milk, oily seeds and meat.

=== Tourism ===
Khorramdarreh is called "The Green Jewel of Zanjan" because of its gardens and green fields. Its gastronomy and restaurants (especially kabab and ab-goosht) are loved by transit drivers from Turkey, Eastern Europe, Armenia, Georgia and Azerbaijan. Hiking and camping in the mountains are very common activities of its locals and tourists. Khorramdarreh's garden alleys (Koucheh-Bagh) in spring and summer host visitors from all over Iran. Family night gatherings in private gardens are a tradition among both elderly and youth.
