= Safiabad Rural District =

Rural district in North Khorasan province, Iran

Safiabad Rural District Persian: دهستان صفی‌آباد
- Rural District
- Location within Iran
- Coordinates: 36°46′N 57°51′E
- Country: Iran
- Province: North Khorasan
- County: Bam and Safiabad
- District: Central
- Established: 1987
- Capital: Alast-e Olya

Population (2016)
  - Total: 6,558
- Time zone: UTC+3:30 (IRST)

Safiabad Rural District (Persian: دهستان صفی‌آباد) is in the Central District (Note: Formerly Bam and Safiabad District of Esfarayen County) of Bam and Safiabad County, North Khorasan province, Iran. Its capital is the village of Alast-e Olya. The previous capital of the rural district was the village of Safiabad, now a city.

== Demographics ==
=== Population ===
At the time of the 2006 National Census, the rural district's population (as a part of Bam and Safiabad District (Note: Renamed the Central District of Bam and Safiabad County) in Esfarayen County) was 7,683 in 1,882 households. There were 7,718 inhabitants in 2,113 households at the following census of 2011. The 2016 census measured the population of the rural district as 6,558 in 2,098 households. The most populous of its 67 villages was Qanbar Baghi (now in Dahaneh-ye Shirin Rural District), with 704 people.

In 2023, the district was separated from the county in the establishment of Bam and Safiabad County and renamed the Central District.

=== Other villages in the rural district ===
- Alast-e Sofla
- Aqazadeh
- Dulchah
- Gappaz
- Gombardi
- Mangeli-ye Olya
- Mangeli-ye Sofla
- Mohammadabad
- Neyab
- Qarah Chah
