= Bam Rural District =

Rural district in North Khorasan province, Iran

Bam Rural District Persian: دهستان بام
- Rural District
- Location within Iran
- Coordinates: 36°54′N 57°56′E
- Country: Iran
- Province: North Khorasan
- County: Bam and Safibad
- District: Bam
- Established: 1987
- Capital: Bam

Population (2016)
  - Total: 6,902
- Time zone: UTC+3:30 (IRST)

Bam Rural District (Persian: دهستان بام) is in Bam District of Bam and Safiabad County, North Khorasan province, Iran. Its capital is the village of Bam.

== Demographics ==
=== Population ===
At the time of the 2006 National Census, the rural district's population (as a part of Bam and Safiabad District (Note: Renamed the Central District of Bam and Safiabad County) in Esfarayen County) was 9,041 in 2,595 households. There were 7,888 inhabitants in 2,537 households at the following census of 2011. The 2016 census measured the population of the rural district as 6,902 in 2,524 households. The most populous of its 42 villages was Bam, with 1,368 people.

In 2023, the district was separated from the county in the establishment of Bam and Safiabad County and renamed the Central District. The rural district was transferred to the new Bam District.

=== Other villages in the rural district ===
- Aghesh
- Anbarbad
- Aq Qaleh
- Bishabad
- Fathabad
- Ghuzeh Zan
- Kalateh-ye Bam
- Now Deh-e Bam
- Qarzi Karji
- Quch Qar
- Tarkheh
