= Central District (Khorramdarreh County) =

District in Zanjan province, Iran

Central District (Khorramdarreh County) Persian: بخش مرکزی شهرستان خرمدره
- District
- Location within Iran
- Coordinates: 36°17′N 49°07′E
- Country: Iran
- Province: Zanjan
- County: Khorramdarreh
- Established: 1997
- Capital: Khorramdarreh

Population (2016)
  - Total: 67,951
- Time zone: UTC+3:30 (IRST)

The Central District of Khorramdarreh County (Persian: بخش مرکزی شهرستان خرمدره) is in Zanjan province, Iran. Its capital is the city of Khorramdarreh.

== Demographics ==
=== Population ===
At the time of the 2006 National Census, the district's population was 60,027 in 15,317 households. The following census in 2011 counted 65,166 people in 18,888 households. The 2016 census measured the population of the district as 67,951 inhabitants in 21,215 households.

=== Administrative divisions ===
Central District (Khorramdarreh County) Population
Administrative Divisions	2006	2011	2016
Alvand RD	873	698	691
Khorramdarreh RD	11,099	11,920	11,892
Khorramdarreh (city)	48,055	52,548	55,368
Total	60,027	65,166	67,951
RD = Rural District
