= Khorramdarreh County =

County in Zanjan province, Iran

Khorramdarreh County Persian: شهرستان خرمدره
- County
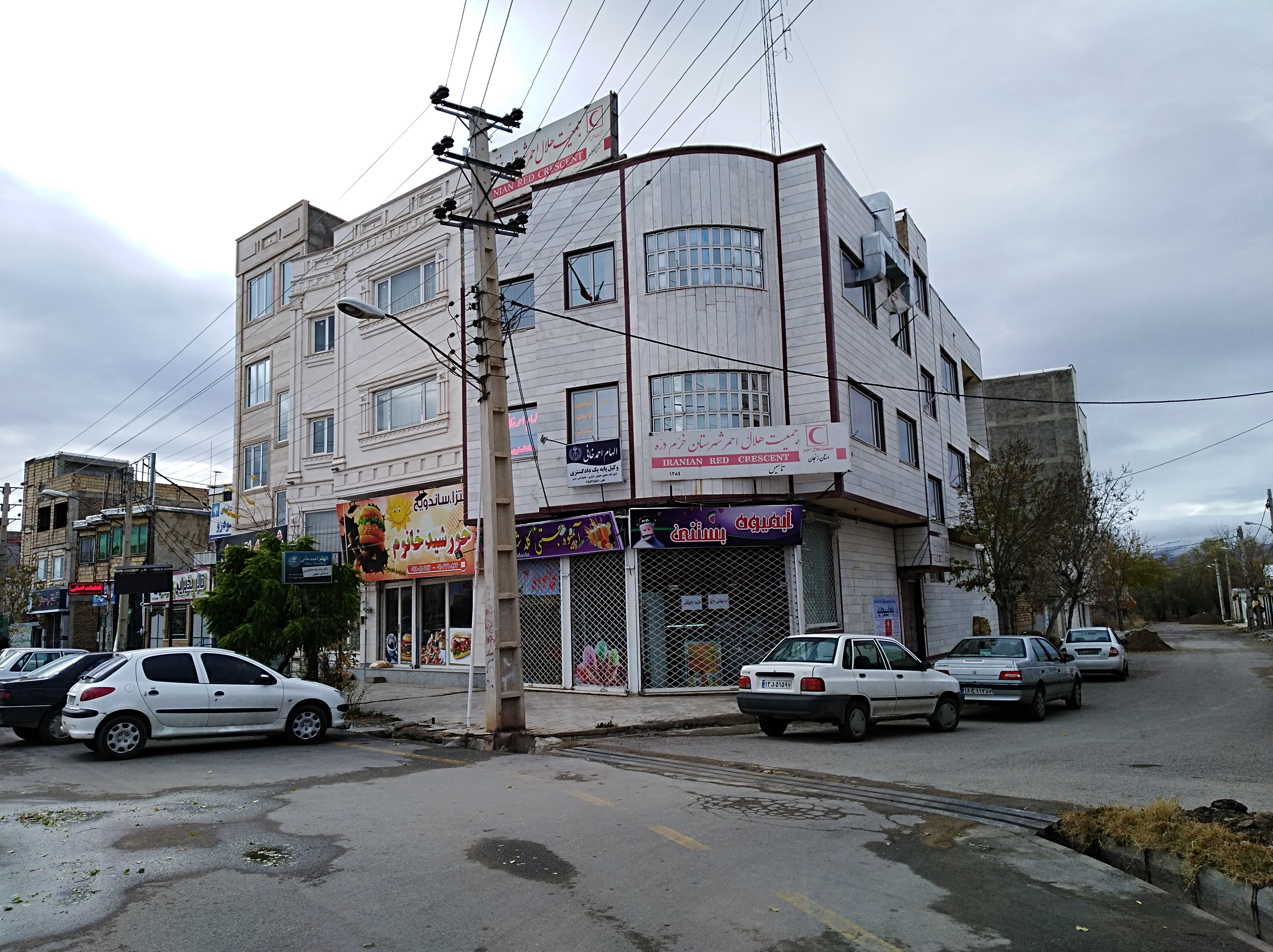
- Red Crescent Building in the city of Khorramdarreh

- Location of Khorramdarreh County in Zanjan province (right, purple)

- Location of Zanjan province in Iran
- Coordinates: 36°17′N 49°07′E
- Country: Iran
- Province: Zanjan
- Established: 1997
- Capital: Khorramdarreh
- Districts: Central

Population (2016)
  - Total: 86,123
- Time zone: UTC+3:30 (IRST)

Khorramdarreh County (Persian: شهرستان خرمدره) is in Zanjan province, Iran. Its capital is the city of Khorramdarreh.

== Demographics ==
=== Population ===
At the time of the 2006 National Census, the county's population was 60,027 in 15,317 households. The following census in 2011 counted 65,166 people in 18,888 households. The 2016 census measured the population of the county as 86,123 in 27,215 households.

=== Administrative divisions ===
Khorramdarreh County's population history and administrative structure over three consecutive censuses are shown in the following table.

Khorramdarreh County Population
Administrative Divisions	2006	2011	2016
Central District	60,027	65,166	67,951
Alvand RD	873	698	699
Khorramdarreh RD	11,099	11,920	16,892
Khorramdarreh (city)	48,055	55,368	68,121
Total	60,027	65,166	86,123
RD = Rural District

== See also ==
Media related to Khorramdarreh County at Wikimedia Commons
