= Bam District =

District in North Khorasan province, Iran

Bam District Persian: بخش بام
- District
- Location within Iran
- Coordinates: 36°56′N 57°55′E
- Country: Iran
- Province: North Khorasan
- County: Bam and Safiabad
- Established: 2023
- Capital: Bam
- Time zone: UTC+3:30 (IRST)

Bam District (Persian: بخش بام) is in Bam and Safiabad County of North Khorasan province, Iran. Its capital is the village of Bam, whose population at the time of the 2016 National Census was 1,368 people in 492 households.

In 2023, Bam and Safiabad District (Note: Renamed the Central District of Bam and Safiabad County) was separated from Esfarayen County in the establishment of Bam and Safiabad County and renamed the Central District. The new county was divided into two districts of two rural districts each, with Safiabad as its capital and only city at the time.

== Demographics ==
=== Administrative divisions ===
Bam District
Administrative Divisions
Bam RD
Sarigol RD
RD: Rural District
