= Bam and Safiabad County =

County in North Khorasan province, Iran

Bam and Safiabad County Persian: شهرستان بام و صفی‌آباد
- County
- Location of Bam and Safiabad County in North Khorasan province (bottom right, purple)

- Location of North Khorasan province in Iran
- Coordinates: 36°48′N 57°53′E
- Country: Iran
- Province: North Khorasan
- Established: 2023
- Capital: Safiabad
- Districts: Central, Bam
- Time zone: UTC+3:30 (IRST)

Bam and Safiabad County (Persian: شهرستان بام و صفی‌آباد) is in North Khorasan province, Iran. Its capital is the city of Safiabad, whose population at the time of the 2016 National Census was 3,427 people in 1,020 households.

== History ==
In 2023, Bam and Safiabad District (Note: Renamed the Central District of Bam and Safiabad County) was separated from Esfarayen County in the establishment of Bam and Safiabad County and renamed the Central District. The new county was divided into two districts of two rural districts each, with Safiabad as its capital and only city at the time.

== Demographics ==
=== Administrative divisions ===
Bam and Safiabad County's administrative structure is shown in the following table.

Bam and Safiabad County
Administrative Divisions
Central District (Note: Formerly Bam and Safiabad District of Esfarayen County)
Dahaneh-ye Shirin RD
Safiabad RD
Safiabad (city)
Bam District
Bam RD
Sarigol RD
RD: Rural District

== See also ==
Media related to Bam and Safiabad County at Wikimedia Commons
