= Central District (Bam and Safiabad County) =

District in North Khorasan province, Iran

Central District (Bam and Safiabad County) Persian: بخش مرکزی شهرستان بام و صفی‌آباد
- District
- Location within Iran
- Coordinates: 36°44′N 57°53′E
- Country: Iran
- Province: North Khorasan
- County: Bam and Safiabad
- Capital: Safiabad

Population (2016)
  - Total: 16,887 (Note: As Bam and Safiabad District of Esfarayen County)
- Time zone: UTC+3:30 (IRST)

The Central District of Bam and Safiabad County (Persian: بخش مرکزی شهرستان بام و صفی‌آباد) (Note: Formerly Bam and Safiabad District (بخش بام و صفی‌آباد) of Esfarayen County) is in North Khorasan province, Iran. Its capital is the city of Safiabad.

== History ==
In 2023, Bam and Safiabad District (Note: Renamed the Central District of Bam and Safiabad County) was separated from Esfarayen County in the establishment of Bam and Safiabad County and renamed the Central District. The new county was divided into two districts of two rural districts each, with Safiabad as its capital and only city at the time.

== Demographics ==
=== Population ===
At the time of the 2006 National Census, the district's population (as Bam and Safiabad District of Esfarayen County) was 19,771 in 5,362 households. The following census in 2011 counted 19,133 people in 5,645 households. The 2016 census measured the population of the district as 16,887 inhabitants in 5,642 households.

=== Administrative divisions ===
Central District (Bam and Safiabad County) (Note: As Bam and Safiabad District of Esfarayen County at the 2006, 2011, and 2016 censuses)
Administrative Divisions	2006	2011	2016
Bam RD (Note: Transferred to Bam District after the 2016 census)	9,041	7,888	6,902
Dahaneh-ye Shirin RD (Note: Established after the 2016 census)			
Safiabad RD	7,683	7,718	6,558
Safiabad (city)	3,047	3,527	3,427
Total	19,771	19,133	16,887
RD = Rural District
