= Shekarabad =

Shekarabad or Shokrabad or Shakrabad (Persian: شکرآباد or شكراباد) may refer to:

- Shekarabad, Ardal, Chaharmahal and Bakhtiari Province
- Shokrabad, Miankuh, Chaharmahal and Bakhtiari Province
- Shokrabad, Fars
- Shokrabad, Hormozgan
- Shekarabad, Baft, Kerman Province
- Shekarabad, Kuhbanan, Kerman Province
- Shekarabad, Manujan, Kerman Province
- Shokrabad, Khuzestan
- Shokrabad, Kurdistan
- Shekarabad, Delfan, Lorestan Province
- Shekarabad, Dorud, Lorestan Province
- Shekarabad, Selseleh, Lorestan Province
- Shekarabad, Markazi
- Shakrabad, Razavi Khorasan
- Shokrabad, Tehran
- Shokrabad-e Kavir, Tehran Province
- Shokrabad, West Azerbaijan
- Shokrabad, Zanjan

== See also ==
- Shukrabad (disambiguation)
