= Aqzuj =

Village in Zanjan province, Iran

Aqzuj Persian: اقزوج
- Village
- Location within Iran
- Coordinates: 36°34′49″N 48°56′21″E
- Country: Iran
- Province: Zanjan
- County: Soltaniyeh
- District: Bagh Helli
- Rural District: Qarah Bolagh

Population (2016)
  - Total: 81
- Time zone: UTC+3:30 (IRST)

Aqzuj (Persian: اقزوج) (Note: Also romanized as Āqzūj) is a village in Qarah Bolagh Rural District of Bagh Helli District in Soltaniyeh County, Zanjan province, Iran.

== Demographics ==
=== Population ===
At the time of the 2006 National Census, the village's population was 73 in 20 households, when it was in Soltaniyeh Rural District of the former Soltaniyeh District in Abhar County. The following census in 2011 counted 55 people in 18 households. The 2016 census measured the population of the village as 81 in 25 households, by which time the district had been separated from the county in the establishment of Soltaniyeh County. The rural district was transferred to the new Central District, and Aqzuj was transferred to Qarah Bolagh Rural District created in the new Bagh Helli District.
