= Kakaabad =

Village in Zanjan province, Iran

Kakaabad Persian: كاكااباد
- Village
- Location within Iran
- Coordinates: 36°32′51″N 48°51′56″E
- Country: Iran
- Province: Zanjan
- County: Soltaniyeh
- District: Bagh Helli
- Rural District: Qarah Bolagh

Population (2016)
  - Total: 453
- Time zone: UTC+3:30 (IRST)

Kakaabad (Persian: كاكااباد) (Note: Also romanized as Kākāābād; also known as Kakābād, Kakveh, Kekva, Kekwa, and Kūkāvā) is a village in Qarah Bolagh Rural District of Bagh Helli District in Soltaniyeh County, Zanjan province, Iran.

== Demographics ==
=== Population ===
At the time of the 2006 National Census, the village's population was 360 in 90 households, when it was in Soltaniyeh Rural District of the former Soltaniyeh District in Abhar County. The following census in 2011 counted 360 people in 107 households. The 2016 census measured the population of the village as 453 in 133 households, by which time the district had been separated from the county in the establishment of Soltaniyeh County. The rural district was transferred to the new Central District, and Kakaabad was transferred to Qarah Bolagh Rural District created in the new Bagh Helli District.
