= Yusefabad, Soltaniyeh =

Village in Zanjan province, Iran

Yusefabad Persian: يوسف اباد
- Village
- Location within Iran
- Coordinates: 36°32′28″N 48°44′32″E
- Country: Iran
- Province: Zanjan
- County: Soltaniyeh
- District: Bagh Helli
- Rural District: Qarah Bolagh

Population (2016)
  - Total: 951
- Time zone: UTC+3:30 (IRST)

Yusefabad (Persian: يوسف اباد) (Note: Also romanized as Yusafabad, Yūsefābād, and Yūsofābād) is a village in Qarah Bolagh Rural District of Bagh Helli District in Soltaniyeh County, Zanjan province, Iran.

== Demographics ==
=== Population ===
At the time of the 2006 National Census, the village's population was 1,102 in 290 households, when it was in Soltaniyeh Rural District of the former Soltaniyeh District in Abhar County. The following census in 2011 counted 1,004 people in 308 households. The 2016 census measured the population of the village as 951 in 302 households, by which time the district had been separated from the county in the establishment of Soltaniyeh County. The rural district was transferred to the new Central District, and Yusefabad was transferred to Qarah Bolagh Rural District created in the new Bagh Helli District.
