= Kheyrabad, Soltaniyeh =

Village in Zanjan province, Iran

Kheyrabad Persian: خيراباد
- Village
- Location within Iran
- Coordinates: 36°30′45″N 48°46′55″E
- Country: Iran
- Province: Zanjan
- County: Soltaniyeh
- District: Bagh Helli
- Rural District: Qarah Bolagh

Population (2016)
  - Total: 2,764
- Time zone: UTC+3:30 (IRST)

Kheyrabad (Persian: خيراباد) (Note: Also romanized as Khairābād, Khayrabad, and Kheyrābād) is a village in Qarah Bolagh Rural District of Bagh Helli District in Soltaniyeh County, Zanjan province, Iran.

== Demographics ==
=== Population ===
At the time of the 2006 National Census, the village's population was 2,617 in 585 households, when it was in Soltaniyeh Rural District of the former Soltaniyeh District in Abhar County. The following census in 2011 counted 2,405 people in 686 households. The 2016 census measured the population of the village as 2,764 in 823 households, by which time the district had been separated from the county in the establishment of Soltaniyeh County. The rural district was transferred to the new Central District, and Kheyrabad was transferred to Qarah Bolagh Rural District created in the new Bagh Helli District. It was the most populous village in its rural district.
