= Qarah Bolagh, Soltaniyeh =

Village in Zanjan province, Iran

Qarah Bolagh Persian: قره بلاغ
- Village
- Location within Iran
- Coordinates: 36°29′40″N 48°47′55″E
- Country: Iran
- Province: Zanjan
- County: Soltaniyeh
- District: Bagh Helli
- Rural District: Qarah Bolagh

Population (2016)
  - Total: 1,242
- Time zone: UTC+3:30 (IRST)

Qarah Bolagh (Persian: قره‌بلاغ) (Note: Also romanized as Qarah Bolāgh and Qareh Bolāgh; also known as Mobārakābād (مبارک‌آباد) and Qarabulāq) is a village in, and the capital of, Qarah Bolagh Rural District in Bagh Helli District of Soltaniyeh County, Zanjan province, Iran.

== Demographics ==
=== Population ===
At the time of the 2006 National Census, the village's population was 1,471 in 360 households, when it was the capital of Soltaniyeh Rural District in the former Soltaniyeh District of Abhar County. The following census in 2011 counted 1,494 people in 445 households. The 2016 census measured the population of the village as 1,242 people in 381 households, by which time the district had been separated from the county in the establishment of Soltaniyeh County. The rural district was transferred to the new Central District, and Qarah Bolagh was transferred to Qarah Bolagh Rural District created in the new Bagh Helli District.
