= Chammeh, Zanjan =

Village in Zanjan province, Iran

Chammeh Persian: چمه
- Village
- Location within Iran
- Coordinates: 36°39′55″N 48°57′23″E
- Country: Iran
- Province: Zanjan
- County: Soltaniyeh
- District: Bagh Helli
- Rural District: Qarah Bolagh

Population (2016)
  - Total: 10
- Time zone: UTC+3:30 (IRST)

Chammeh (Persian: چمه) (Note: Also romanized as Chameh; also known as Chamba) is a village in Qarah Bolagh Rural District of Bagh Helli District in Soltaniyeh County, Zanjan province, Iran.

== Demographics ==
=== Population ===
At the time of the 2006 National Census, the village's population was 24 in 11 households, when it was in Soltaniyeh Rural District of the former Soltaniyeh District in Abhar County. The following census in 2011 showed a population below the reporting threshold. The 2016 census measured the population of the village as 10 in five households, by which time the district had been separated from the county in the establishment of Soltaniyeh County. The rural district was transferred to the new Central District, and Chammeh was transferred to Qarah Bolagh Rural District created in the new Bagh Helli District.
