= Sorkheh Dizaj, Soltaniyeh =

Village in Zanjan province, Iran

Sorkheh Dizaj Persian: سرخه ديزج
- Village
- Location within Iran
- Coordinates: 36°35′27″N 48°51′25″E
- Country: Iran
- Province: Zanjan
- County: Soltaniyeh
- District: Bagh Helli
- Rural District: Qarah Bolagh

Population (2016)
  - Total: 741
- Time zone: UTC+3:30 (IRST)

Sorkheh Dizaj (Persian: سرخه ديزج) (Note: Also romanized as Sorkheh Dīzaj; also known as Sorkh Dīzaj, Sorkheh Dīzaj-e Solţānīyeh, Surkha Dīzaj, and Surkha-Dizadzh) is a village in Qarah Bolagh Rural District of Bagh Helli District in Soltaniyeh County, Zanjan province, Iran.

== Demographics ==
=== Population ===
At the time of the 2006 National Census, the village's population was 758 in 170 households, when it was in Soltaniyeh Rural District of the former Soltaniyeh District in Abhar County. The following census in 2011 counted 692 people in 218 households. The 2016 census measured the population of the village as 741 in 226 households, by which time the district had been separated from the county in the establishment of Soltaniyeh County. The rural district was transferred to the new Central District, and Sorkheh Dizaj was transferred to Qarah Bolagh Rural District created in the new Bagh Helli District.
