= Cham Rud, Zanjan =

Village in Zanjan province, Iran

Cham Rud Persian: چمرود
- Village
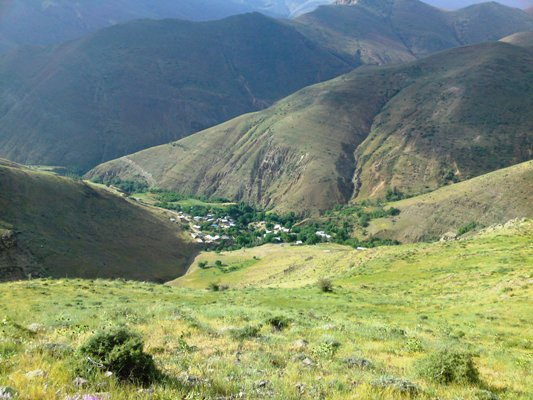
- The village of Cham Rud

- Location within Iran
- Coordinates: 36°40′21″N 48°57′08″E
- Country: Iran
- Province: Zanjan
- County: Soltaniyeh
- District: Bagh Helli
- Rural District: Qarah Bolagh

Population (2016)
  - Total: 31
- Time zone: UTC+3:30 (IRST)

Cham Rud (Persian: چمرود) (Note: Also romanized as Cham Rūd, Chamerud, and Chamrūd) is a village in Qarah Bolagh Rural District of Bagh Helli District in Soltaniyeh County, Zanjan province, Iran.

== Demographics ==
=== Population ===
At the time of the 2006 National Census, the village's population was 63 in 12 households, when it was in Soltaniyeh Rural District of the former Soltaniyeh District in Abhar County. The following census in 2011 counted 26 people in six households. The 2016 census measured the population of the village as 31 in 12 households, by which time the district had been separated from the county in the establishment of Soltaniyeh County. The rural district was transferred to the new Central District, and Cham Rud was transferred to Qarah Bolagh Rural District created in the new Bagh Helli District.
