= Asadabad, Soltaniyeh =

Village in Zanjan province, Iran

Asadabad Persian: اسداباد
- Village
- Location within Iran
- Coordinates: 36°22′28″N 48°46′20″E
- Country: Iran
- Province: Zanjan
- County: Soltaniyeh
- District: Central
- Rural District: Sonbolabad

Population (2016)
  - Total: 101
- Time zone: UTC+3:30 (IRST)

Asadabad (Persian: اسداباد) (Note: Also romanized as Asadābād) is a village in Sonbolabad Rural District of the Central District in Soltaniyeh County, Zanjan province, Iran.

== Demographics ==
=== Population ===
At the time of the 2006 National Census, the village's population was 147 in 41 households, when it was in the former Soltaniyeh District of Abhar County. The following census in 2011 counted 113 people in 38 households. The 2016 census measured the population of the village as 101 people in 37 households, by which time the district had been separated from the county in the establishment of Soltaniyeh County. The rural district was transferred to the new Central District.
