= Qiasiyeh =

Village in Zanjan province, Iran

Qiasiyeh Persian: قياسيه
- Village
- Location within Iran
- Coordinates: 36°22′08″N 48°48′39″E
- Country: Iran
- Province: Zanjan
- County: Soltaniyeh
- District: Central
- Rural District: Sonbolabad

Population (2016)
  - Total: 277
- Time zone: UTC+3:30 (IRST)

Qiasiyeh (Persian: قياسيه) (Note: Also romanized as Qeyāsīyeh and Qīāsīyeh; also known as Kayasa, Qīāseh, and Qiyasa) is a village in Sonbolabad Rural District of the Central District in Soltaniyeh County, Zanjan province, Iran.

== Demographics ==
=== Population ===
At the time of the 2006 National Census, the village's population was 273 in 69 households, when it was in the former Soltaniyeh District of Abhar County. The following census in 2011 counted 265 people in 79 households. The 2016 census measured the population of the village as 277 people in 85 households, by which time the district had been separated from the county in the establishment of Soltaniyeh County. The rural district was transferred to the new Central District.
