= Abbasabad, Zanjan =

Village in Zanjan province, Iran

Abbasabad Persian: عباس اباد
- Village
- Location within Iran
- Coordinates: 36°26′51″N 48°44′52″E
- Country: Iran
- Province: Zanjan
- County: Soltaniyeh
- District: Central
- Rural District: Soltaniyeh

Population (2016)
  - Total: 18
- Time zone: UTC+3:30 (IRST)

Abbasabad (Persian: عباس اباد) (Note: Also romanized as ‘Abbāsābād) is a village in Soltaniyeh Rural District of the Central District in Soltaniyeh County, Zanjan province, Iran.

== Demographics ==
=== Population ===
At the time of the 2006 National Census, the village's population was 26 in five households, when it was in the former Soltaniyeh District of Abhar County. The following census in 2011 counted 21 people in five households. The 2016 census measured the population of the village as 18 people in five households, by which time the district had been separated from the county in the establishment of Soltaniyeh County. The rural district was transferred to the new Central District.
