= Sarijalu, Zanjan =

Village in Zanjan province, Iran

Sarijalu Persian: ساريجالو
- Village
- Location within Iran
- Coordinates: 36°29′19″N 48°41′34″E
- Country: Iran
- Province: Zanjan
- County: Soltaniyeh
- District: Bagh Helli
- Rural District: Guzal Darreh

Population (2016)
  - Total: 553
- Time zone: UTC+3:30 (IRST)

Sarijalu (Persian: ساريجالو) (Note: Also romanized as Sārījālū; also known as Sardzhalu, Sārejlū, Sārījlū, Sārījollū, Sārījolū, and Sārjalū) is a village in Guzal Darreh Rural District of Bagh Helli District in Soltaniyeh County, Zanjan province, Iran.

== Demographics ==
=== Population ===
At the time of the 2006 National Census, the village's population was 451 in 115 households, when it was in the former Soltaniyeh District of Abhar County. The following census in 2011 counted 483 people in 142 households. The 2016 census measured the population of the village as 553 people in 176 households, by which time the district had been separated from the county in the establishment of Soltaniyeh County. The rural district was transferred to the new Bagh Helli District.
