= Arjin =

Village in Zanjan province, Iran

Arjin Persian: ارجين
- Village
- Location within Iran
- Coordinates: 36°24′38″N 48°42′44″E
- Country: Iran
- Province: Zanjan
- County: Soltaniyeh
- District: Central
- Rural District: Soltaniyeh

Population (2016)
  - Total: 155
- Time zone: UTC+3:30 (IRST)

Arjin (Persian: ارجين) (Note: Also romanized as Ardzhin, Arjīn and Arojīn) is a village in Soltaniyeh Rural District of the Central District in Soltaniyeh County, Zanjan province, Iran.

== Demographics ==
=== Population ===
At the time of the 2006 National Census, the village's population was 164 in 48 households, when it was in the former Soltaniyeh District of Abhar County. The following census in 2011 counted 159 people in 45 households. The 2016 census measured the population of the village as 155 people in 45 households, by which time the district had been separated from the county in the establishment of Soltaniyeh County. The rural district was transferred to the new Central District.
