= Khorram Daraq, Zanjan =

Village in Zanjan province, Iran

Khorram Daraq Persian: خرمدرق
- Village
- Location within Iran
- Coordinates: 36°26′32″N 48°36′40″E
- Country: Iran
- Province: Zanjan
- County: Soltaniyeh
- District: Bagh Helli
- Rural District: Guzal Darreh

Population (2016)
  - Total: 781
- Time zone: UTC+3:30 (IRST)

Khorram Daraq (Persian: خرمدرق) (Note: Also known as Khorram Darreh, Khurem-Dara, and Khurram Darreh) is a village in Guzal Darreh Rural District of Bagh Helli District in Soltaniyeh County, Zanjan province, Iran.

== Demographics ==
=== Population ===
At the time of the 2006 National Census, the village's population was 892 in 233 households, when it was in the former Soltaniyeh District of Abhar County. The following census in 2011 counted 827 people in 244 households. The 2016 census measured the population of the village as 781 people in 244 households, by which time the district had been separated from the county in the establishment of Soltaniyeh County. The rural district was transferred to the new Bagh Helli District.
