= Vik, Iran =

Village in Zanjan province, Iran

Vik Persian: ویک
- Village
- Location within Iran
- Coordinates: 36°15′35″N 48°49′54″E
- Country: Iran
- Province: Zanjan
- County: Soltaniyeh
- District: Central
- Rural District: Sonbolabad

Population (2016)
  - Total: 375
- Time zone: UTC+3:30 (IRST)

Vik (Persian: ویک) (Note: Also romanized as Vīk; also known as Wik) is a village in Sonbolabad Rural District of the Central District in Soltaniyeh County, Zanjan province, Iran.

== Demographics ==
=== Population ===
At the time of the 2006 National Census, the village's population was 559 in 126 households, when it was in the former Soltaniyeh District of Abhar County. The following census in 2011 counted 524 people in 133 households. The 2016 census measured the population of the village as 375 people in 114 households, by which time the district had been separated from the county in the establishment of Soltaniyeh County. The rural district was transferred to the new Central District.
