= Qaleh, Soltaniyeh =

Village in Zanjan province, Iran

Qaleh Persian: قلعه
- Village
- Location within Iran
- Coordinates: 36°26′57″N 48°46′54″E
- Country: Iran
- Province: Zanjan
- County: Soltaniyeh
- District: Central
- Rural District: Soltaniyeh

Population (2016)
  - Total: 306
- Time zone: UTC+3:30 (IRST)

Qaleh (Persian: قلعه) (Note: Also romanized as Qal‘eh; also known as Kalekh and Qal‘eh-ye Solţānīyeh) is a village in Soltaniyeh Rural District of the Central District in Soltaniyeh County, Zanjan province, Iran.

== Demographics ==
=== Population ===
At the time of the 2006 National Census, the village's population was 317 in 83 households, when it was in the former Soltaniyeh District of Abhar County. The following census in 2011 counted 308 people in 96 households. The 2016 census measured the population of the village as 306 people in 99 households, by which time the district had been separated from the county in the establishment of Soltaniyeh County. The rural district was transferred to the new Central District.
