= Kordenab =

Village in Zanjan province, Iran

Kordenab Persian: كردناب
- Village
- Location within Iran
- Coordinates: 36°29′29″N 48°35′48″E
- Country: Iran
- Province: Zanjan
- County: Soltaniyeh
- District: Bagh Helli
- Rural District: Guzal Darreh

Population (2016)
  - Total: 230
- Time zone: UTC+3:30 (IRST)

Kordenab (Persian: كردناب) (Note: Also romanized as Kordenāb; also known as Gordāb, Kirdahnu, Kirdakhnu, and Kordeh Nāb) is a village in Guzal Darreh Rural District of Bagh Helli District in Soltaniyeh County, Zanjan province, Iran.

== Demographics ==
=== Population ===
At the time of the 2006 National Census, the village's population was 309 in 63 households, when it was in the former Soltaniyeh District of Abhar County. The following census in 2011 counted 290 people in 80 households. The 2016 census measured the population of the village as 230 people in 76 households, by which time the district had been separated from the county in the establishment of Soltaniyeh County. The rural district was transferred to the new Bagh Helli District.
