= Sonbolabad =

Sonbolabad (Persian: سنبل اباد) may refer to:

- Sonbolabad, Qazvin
- Sonbolabad, Zanjan
- Sonbolabad Rural District, in Zanjan Province
