= Do Sangan =

Village in Zanjan province, Iran

Do Sangan Persian: دوسنگان
- Village
- Location within Iran
- Coordinates: 36°29′39″N 48°56′17″E
- Country: Iran
- Province: Zanjan
- County: Soltaniyeh
- District: Central
- Rural District: Sonbolabad

Population (2016)
  - Total: 273
- Time zone: UTC+3:30 (IRST)

Do Sangan (Persian: دوسنگان) (Note: Also romanized as Do Sangān and Dowsangān; also known as Dowsankāl and Tūsangān) is a village in Sonbolabad Rural District of the Central District in Soltaniyeh County, Zanjan province, Iran.

== Demographics ==
=== Population ===
At the time of the 2006 National Census, the village's population was 376 in 80 households, when it was in the former Soltaniyeh District of Abhar County. The following census in 2011 counted 251 people in 77 households. The 2016 census measured the population of the village as 273 people in 85 households, by which time the district had been separated from the county in the establishment of Soltaniyeh County. The rural district was transferred to the new Central District.
