= Moshkabad, Zanjan =

Village in Zanjan province, Iran

Moshkabad Persian: مشك اباد
- Village
- Location within Iran
- Coordinates: 36°30′36″N 48°45′06″E
- Country: Iran
- Province: Zanjan
- County: Soltaniyeh
- District: Central
- Rural District: Soltaniyeh

Population (2016)
  - Total: 488
- Time zone: UTC+3:30 (IRST)

Moshkabad (Persian: مشك اباد (Note: Also romanized as Moshkābād) is a village in Soltaniyeh Rural District of the Central District in Soltaniyeh County, Zanjan province, Iran.

== Demographics ==
=== Population ===
At the time of the 2006 National Census, the village's population was 407 in 103 households, when it was in the former Soltaniyeh District of Abhar County. The following census in 2011 counted 461 people in 143 households. The 2016 census measured the population of the village as 488 people in 150 households, by which time the district had been separated from the county in the establishment of Soltaniyeh County. The rural district was transferred to the new Central District. Moshkabad was the most populous village in its rural district.
