= Kor Daraq =

Village in Zanjan province, Iran

Kor Daraq Persian: كردرق
- Village
- Location within Iran
- Coordinates: 36°26′39″N 48°38′16″E
- Country: Iran
- Province: Zanjan
- County: Soltaniyeh
- District: Bagh Helli
- Rural District: Guzal Darreh

Population (2016)
  - Total: 81
- Time zone: UTC+3:30 (IRST)

Kor Daraq (Persian: كردرق) (Note: Also known as Gardaraq, Kar Darreh, Kordarreh, and Kyar-Dara) is a village in Guzal Darreh Rural District of Bagh Helli District in Soltaniyeh County, Zanjan province, Iran.

== Demographics ==
=== Population ===
At the time of the 2006 National Census, the village's population was 127 in 43 households, when it was in the former Soltaniyeh District of Abhar County. The following census in 2011 counted 130 people in 42 households. The 2016 census measured the population of the village as 81 people in 32 households, by which time the district had been separated from the county in the establishment of Soltaniyeh County. The rural district was transferred to the new Bagh Helli District.
