= Torkandeh =

Village in Zanjan province, Iran

Torkandeh Persian: تركانده
- Village
- Location within Iran
- Coordinates: 36°19′45″N 48°48′28″E
- Country: Iran
- Province: Zanjan
- County: Soltaniyeh
- District: Central
- Rural District: Sonbolabad

Population (2016)
  - Total: 156
- Time zone: UTC+3:30 (IRST)

Torkandeh (Persian: تركانده) (Note: Also romanized as Torkāndeh; also known as Turkanda) is a village in Sonbolabad Rural District of the Central District in Soltaniyeh County, Zanjan province, Iran.

== Demographics ==
=== Population ===
At the time of the 2006 National Census, the village's population was 239 in 57 households, when it was in the former Soltaniyeh District of Abhar County. The following census in 2011 counted 211 people in 63 households. The 2016 census measured the population of the village as 156 people in 48 households, by which time the district had been separated from the county in the establishment of Soltaniyeh County. The rural district was transferred to the new Central District.
