= Nadirabad =

Village in Zanjan province, Iran

Nadirabad Persian: نديراباد
- Village
- Location within Iran
- Coordinates: 36°22′10″N 48°42′54″E
- Country: Iran
- Province: Zanjan
- County: Soltaniyeh
- District: Central
- Rural District: Soltaniyeh

Population (2016)
  - Total: 21
- Time zone: UTC+3:30 (IRST)

Nadirabad (Persian: نديراباد) (Note: Also romanized as Nadīrābād; also known as Kadrabad, Nāderābād, Nadīsābād, and Nadrābād) is a village in Soltaniyeh Rural District of the Central District in Soltaniyeh County, Zanjan province, Iran.

== Demographics ==
=== Population ===
At the time of the 2006 National Census, the village's population was 37 in seven households, when it was in the former Soltaniyeh District of Abhar County. The following census in 2011 counted 21 people in six households. The 2016 census measured the population of the village as 21 people in five households, by which time the district had been separated from the county in the establishment of Soltaniyeh County. The rural district was transferred to the new Central District.
