= Viyar, Zanjan =

Village in Zanjan province, Iran

Viyar Persian: وير
- Village
- Location within Iran
- Coordinates: 36°20′59″N 48°50′33″E
- Country: Iran
- Province: Zanjan
- County: Soltaniyeh
- District: Central
- Rural District: Sonbolabad

Population (2016)
  - Total: 3,548
- Time zone: UTC+3:30 (IRST)

Viyar (Persian: وير) (Note: Also romanized as Veyar, Vīār, Vīr, and Vīyar) is a village in Sonbolabad Rural District of the Central District in Soltaniyeh County, Zanjan province, Iran.

== Demographics ==
=== Population ===
At the time of the 2006 National Census, the village's population was 2,924 in 752 households, when it was in the former Soltaniyeh District of Abhar County. The following census in 2011 counted 3,131 people in 922 households. The 2016 census measured the population of the village as 3,548 people in 1,075 households, by which time the district had been separated from the county in the establishment of Soltaniyeh County. The rural district was transferred to the new Central District. It was the most populous village in its rural district.
