= Cheshmeh Sar, Zanjan =

Village in Zanjan province, Iran

Cheshmeh Sar Persian: چشمه سار
- Village
- Location within Iran
- Coordinates: 36°21′35″N 48°43′53″E
- Country: Iran
- Province: Zanjan
- County: Soltaniyeh
- District: Central
- Rural District: Sonbolabad

Population (2016)
  - Total: 92
- Time zone: UTC+3:30 (IRST)

Cheshmeh Sar (Persian: چشمه سار) (Note: Formerly known as Shalvar (شلوار), also romanized as Shalvār; also known as Chalaar, Chālvār, and Chalwār) is a village in Sonbolabad Rural District of the Central District in Soltaniyeh County, Zanjan province, Iran.

== Demographics ==
=== Population ===
At the time of the 2006 National Census, the village's population was 121 in 32 households, when it was in the former Soltaniyeh District of Abhar County. The following census in 2011 counted 103 people in 28 households. The 2016 census measured the population of the village as 92 people in 30 households, by which time the district had been separated from the county in the establishment of Soltaniyeh County. The rural district was transferred to the new Central District.
