= Valayesh =

Village in Zanjan province, Iran

Valayesh Persian: والايش
- Village
- Location within Iran
- Coordinates: 36°27′45″N 48°59′06″E
- Country: Iran
- Province: Zanjan
- County: Soltaniyeh
- District: Central
- Rural District: Sonbolabad

Population (2016)
  - Total: 882
- Time zone: UTC+3:30 (IRST)

Valayesh (Persian: والايش) (Note: Also romanized as Vālāyesh; also known as Vilaish and Vilashi) is a village in Sonbolabad Rural District of the Central District in Soltaniyeh County, Zanjan province, Iran.

== Demographics ==
=== Population ===
At the time of the 2006 National Census, the village's population was 890 in 224 households, when it was in the former Soltaniyeh District of Abhar County. The following census in 2011 counted 853 people in 247 households. The 2016 census measured the population of the village as 882 people in 276 households, by which time the district had been separated from the county in the establishment of Soltaniyeh County. The rural district was transferred to the new Central District.
