= Kabud Gonbad, Zanjan =

Village in Zanjan province, Iran

Kabud Gonbad Persian: كبودگنبد
- Village
- Location within Iran
- Coordinates: 36°23′10″N 48°44′08″E
- Country: Iran
- Province: Zanjan
- County: Soltaniyeh
- District: Central
- Rural District: Soltaniyeh

Population (2016)
  - Total: 249
- Time zone: UTC+3:30 (IRST)

Kabud Gonbad (Persian: كبودگنبد) (Note: Also romanized as Kabūd Gonbad; also known as Shubend) is a village in Soltaniyeh Rural District of the Central District in Soltaniyeh County, Zanjan province, Iran.

== Demographics ==
=== Population ===
At the time of the 2006 National Census, the village's population was 385 in 85 households, when it was in the former Soltaniyeh District of Abhar County. The following census in 2011 counted 322 people in 81 households. The 2016 census measured the population of the village as 249 people in 80 households, by which time the district had been separated from the county in the establishment of Soltaniyeh County. The rural district was transferred to the new Central District.
