= Almaki =

Village in Zanjan province, Iran

Almaki Persian: المكي
- Village
- Location within Iran
- Coordinates: 36°28′52″N 48°45′31″E
- Country: Iran
- Province: Zanjan
- County: Soltaniyeh
- District: Central
- Rural District: Soltaniyeh

Population (2016)
  - Total: 454
- Time zone: UTC+3:30 (IRST)

Almaki (Persian: المكي) (Note: Also romanized as Almakī and Alamakī; also known as Alamgī and Almak) is a village in Soltaniyeh Rural District of the Central District in Soltaniyeh County, Zanjan province, Iran.

== Demographics ==
=== Population ===
At the time of the 2006 National Census, the village's population was 420 in 98 households, when it was in the former Soltaniyeh District of Abhar County. The following census in 2011 counted 416 people in 111 households. The 2016 census measured the population of the village as 454 people in 130 households, by which time the district had been separated from the county in the establishment of Soltaniyeh County. The rural district was transferred to the new Central District.
