= Mihman-e Shahr Soltaniyeh =

Village in Zanjan province, Iran

Mihman-e Shahr Soltaniyeh Persian: ميهمان شهرسلطانيه
- Village
- Country: Iran
- Province: Zanjan
- County: Soltaniyeh
- District: Central
- Rural District: Soltaniyeh

Population (2016)
  - Total: 15
- Time zone: UTC+3:30 (IRST)

Mihman-e Shahr Soltaniyeh (Persian: ميهمان شهرسلطانيه) (Note: Also romanized as Mīhmān-e Shahr Solṭānīyeh) is a village in Soltaniyeh Rural District of the Central District in Soltaniyeh County, Zanjan province, Iran.

== Demographics ==
=== Population ===
At the time of the 2006 National Census, the village's population was 28 in 10 households, when it was in the former Soltaniyeh District of Abhar County. The following census in 2011 counted 31 people in 13 households. The 2016 census measured the population of the village as 15 people in eight households, by which time the district had been separated from the county in the establishment of Soltaniyeh County. The rural district was transferred to the new Central District.
