= Sabz Daraq =

Village in Zanjan province, Iran

Sabz Daraq Persian: سبزدرق
- Village
- Location within Iran
- Coordinates: 36°28′42″N 48°34′14″E
- Country: Iran
- Province: Zanjan
- County: Soltaniyeh
- District: Bagh Helli
- Rural District: Guzal Darreh

Population (2016)
  - Total: 271
- Time zone: UTC+3:30 (IRST)

Sabz Daraq (Persian: سبزدرق) (Note: Also known as Sabzeh Daraq) is a village in Guzal Darreh Rural District of Bagh Helli District in Soltaniyeh County, Zanjan province, Iran.

== Demographics ==
=== Population ===
At the time of the 2006 National Census, the village's population was 417 in 99 households, when it was in the former Soltaniyeh District of Abhar County. The following census in 2011 counted 388 people in 105 households. The 2016 census measured the population of the village as 271 people in 89 households, by which time the district had been separated from the county in the establishment of Soltaniyeh County. The rural district was transferred to the new Bagh Helli District.
