= Owlang, Zanjan =

Village in Zanjan province, Iran

Owlang Persian: اولنگ
- Village
- Location within Iran
- Coordinates: 36°24′21″N 48°43′57″E
- Country: Iran
- Province: Zanjan
- County: Soltaniyeh
- District: Central
- Rural District: Soltaniyeh

Population (2016)
  - Total: 112
- Time zone: UTC+3:30 (IRST)

Owlang (Persian: اولنگ) (Note: Also romanized as Ūlang; also known as Ulan) is a village in Soltaniyeh Rural District of the Central District in Soltaniyeh County, Zanjan province, Iran.

== Demographics ==
=== Population ===
At the time of the 2006 National Census, the village's population was 123 in 27 households, when it was in the former Soltaniyeh District of Abhar County. The following census in 2011 counted 119 people in 29 households. The 2016 census measured the population of the village as 112 people in 31 households, by which time the district had been separated from the county in the establishment of Soltaniyeh County. The rural district was transferred to the new Central District.
