= Buin, Zanjan =

Village in Zanjan province, Iran

Buin Persian: بوئين
- Village
- Location within Iran
- Coordinates: 36°30′52″N 48°54′11″E
- Country: Iran
- Province: Zanjan
- County: Soltaniyeh
- District: Central
- Rural District: Sonbolabad

Population (2016)
  - Total: 1,358
- Time zone: UTC+3:30 (IRST)

Buin (Persian: بوئين) (Note: Also romanized as Bū’īn and Būyīn) is a village in Sonbolabad Rural District of the Central District in Soltaniyeh County, Zanjan province, Iran.

== Demographics ==
=== Population ===
At the time of the 2006 National Census, the village's population was 1,226 in 326 households, when it was in the former Soltaniyeh District of Abhar County. The following census in 2011 counted 1,295 people in 409 households. The 2016 census measured the population of the village as 1,358 people in 431 households, by which time the district had been separated from the county in the establishment of Soltaniyeh County. The rural district was transferred to the new Central District.
