= Salman Kandi, Zanjan =

Village in Zanjan province, Iran

Salman Kandi Persian: سلمان كندي
- Village
- Location within Iran
- Coordinates: 36°27′00″N 48°39′43″E
- Country: Iran
- Province: Zanjan
- County: Soltaniyeh
- District: Bagh Helli
- Rural District: Guzal Darreh

Population (2016)
  - Total: 332
- Time zone: UTC+3:30 (IRST)

Salman Kandi (Persian: سلمان كندي) (Note: Also romanized as Salmān Kandī) is a village in Guzal Darreh Rural District of Bagh Helli District in Soltaniyeh County, Zanjan province, Iran.

== Demographics ==
=== Population ===
At the time of the 2006 National Census, the village's population was 416 in 100 households, when it was in the former Soltaniyeh District of Abhar County. The following census in 2011 counted 365 people in 103 households. The 2016 census measured the population of the village as 332 people in 91 households, by which time the district had been separated from the county in the establishment of Soltaniyeh County. The rural district was transferred to the new Bagh Helli District.
