= Chah Darreh =

Chah Darreh (Persian: چاهدره or چاه دره) may refer to:

- Chah Darreh, Mashhad, Razavi Khorasan Province
- Chah Darreh, Zanjan
