= Sorkheh Dizaj =

Sorkheh Dizaj (Persian: سرخه ديزج), also rendered as Sorkh Dizaj, may refer to:

- Sorkheh Dizaj, East Azerbaijan
- Sorkheh Dizaj, Abhar, Zanjan Province
- Sorkheh Dizaj, Tarom, Zanjan Province
