= Guzal Darreh =

Guzal Darreh (Persian: گوزلدره) may refer to:

- Guzal Darreh-ye Sofla
- Guzal Darreh Rural District
