= Cham Rud =

Cham Rud or Chamrud or Chamerud (Persian: چم رود) may refer to:

- Cham Rud, Isfahan
- Cham Rud, Kermanshah
- Cham Rud, Zanjan
- Cham Rud Rural District, in Isfahan Province
