= Tahmasababad, Zanjan =

Village in Zanjan province, Iran

Tahmasababad Persian: طهماسب اباد
- Village
- Location within Iran
- Coordinates: 36°23′09″N 48°39′46″E
- Country: Iran
- Province: Zanjan
- County: Soltaniyeh
- District: Central
- Rural District: Soltaniyeh

Population (2016)
  - Total: 121
- Time zone: UTC+3:30 (IRST)

Tahmasababad (Persian: طهماسب اباد) (Note: Also romanized as Ţahmāsabābād; also known as Ţahmāsābād) is a village in Soltaniyeh Rural District of the Central District in Soltaniyeh County, Zanjan province, Iran.

== Demographics ==
=== Population ===
At the time of the 2006 National Census, the village's population was 137 in 29 households, when it was in the former Soltaniyeh District of Abhar County. The following census in 2011 counted 128 people in 32 households. The 2016 census measured the population of the village as 121 people in 36 households, by which time the district had been separated from the county in the establishment of Soltaniyeh County. The rural district was transferred to the new Central District.
