= Wulan (disambiguation) =

Wulan is a county in Qinghai, China.

Wulan may also refer to:

- Wulan (TV series), a 2006–2007 Indonesian soap opera television series
- Wulan (Javanese calendar), month in Javanese calendar
- Ulan (politician) or Wulan, Chinese politician

== See also ==
- Ulan (disambiguation)
- Ulaan (disambiguation), Mongolian word for red
