= Sonbolabad, Zanjan =

Village in Zanjan province, Iran

Sonbolabad Persian: سنبل اباد
- Village
- Location within Iran
- Coordinates: 36°26′08″N 48°52′38″E
- Country: Iran
- Province: Zanjan
- County: Soltaniyeh
- District: Central
- Rural District: Sonbolabad

Population (2016)
  - Total: 721
- Time zone: UTC+3:30 (IRST)

Sonbolabad (Persian: سنبل اباد) (Note: Also romanized as Sanbalabad and Sonbolābād) is a village in, and the capital of, Sonbolabad Rural District in the Central District of Soltaniyeh County, Zanjan province, Iran.

== Demographics ==
=== Population ===
At the time of the 2006 National Census, the village's population was 772 in 191 households, when it was in the former Soltaniyeh District of Abhar County. The following census in 2011 counted 738 people in 226 households. The 2016 census measured the population of the village as 721 people in 218 households, by which time the district had been separated from the county in the establishment of Soltaniyeh County. The rural district was transferred to the new Central District.
