= Ulan =

Ulan may refer to:

== Places ==
- Ulan, New South Wales, a town in Australia
- Ulan County, in Qinghai Province, China
- Ulan District, eastern Kazakhstan
- Ulan, Iran, a village in Zanjan Province

== People ==
- Ulan, politician from Inner Mongolia, China

== Military ==
- Uhlan, Tatar-modelled light cavalry that formed part of the Polish, Russian, Prussian, and Austrian armies until the 20th century
- ASCOD Ulan, a modern Austrian infantry fighting vehicle

== Music ==
- "Ulan" (Rivermaya song), on the group's 1994 self-titled album
- "Ulan", a song by Filipino rock group Cueshé on their 2005 album Half Empty, Half Full

== Other uses ==
- Ulan (cycling team), a 2008 Kazakh road-racing team
- Ulan (film), a 2019 Filipino film
- Oil of Ulan, the Australasian localisation used until the 1990s for the skin-cream product Olay
- Union List of Artist Names (ULAN), a controlled vocabulary maintained by the Getty Vocabulary Program
- Ulan, the player character of the 2021 video game Astria Ascending

== See also ==
- Ulaan (disambiguation), Mongolian word for red
- Wulan (disambiguation)
