= Chameh =

Chameh or variants may refer to the following places:

- Chameh, Kermanshah, Iran
- Chammeh, Zanjan, Iran
- Shamaa or Chamaa, Lebanon

== See also ==
- Chamoe, the Korean melon
