= Chap Darreh, Zanjan =

Village in Zanjan province, Iran

Chap Darreh Persian: چپ دره
- Village
- Location within Iran
- Coordinates: 36°22′47″N 48°42′07″E
- Country: Iran
- Province: Zanjan
- County: Soltaniyeh
- District: Central
- Rural District: Soltaniyeh

Population (2016)
  - Total: 89
- Time zone: UTC+3:30 (IRST)

Chap Darreh (Persian: چپ دره) (Note: Also known as Chāh Darreh and Chakh-Darrekh) is a village in Soltaniyeh Rural District of the Central District in Soltaniyeh County, Zanjan province, Iran.

== Demographics ==
=== Population ===
At the time of the 2006 National Census, the village's population was 179 in 44 households, when it was in the former Soltaniyeh District of Abhar County. The following census in 2011 counted 127 people in 41 households. The 2016 census measured the population of the village as 89 people in 34 households, by which time the district had been separated from the county in the establishment of Soltaniyeh County. The rural district was transferred to the new Central District.
