= Shukrabad =

Shukrabad (Persian: شوکرآباد) may refer to:

- Shukrabad, Kurdistan
- Shukrabad, Zanjan

== See also ==
- Shokrabad (disambiguation)
