= Chaka Salt Lake =

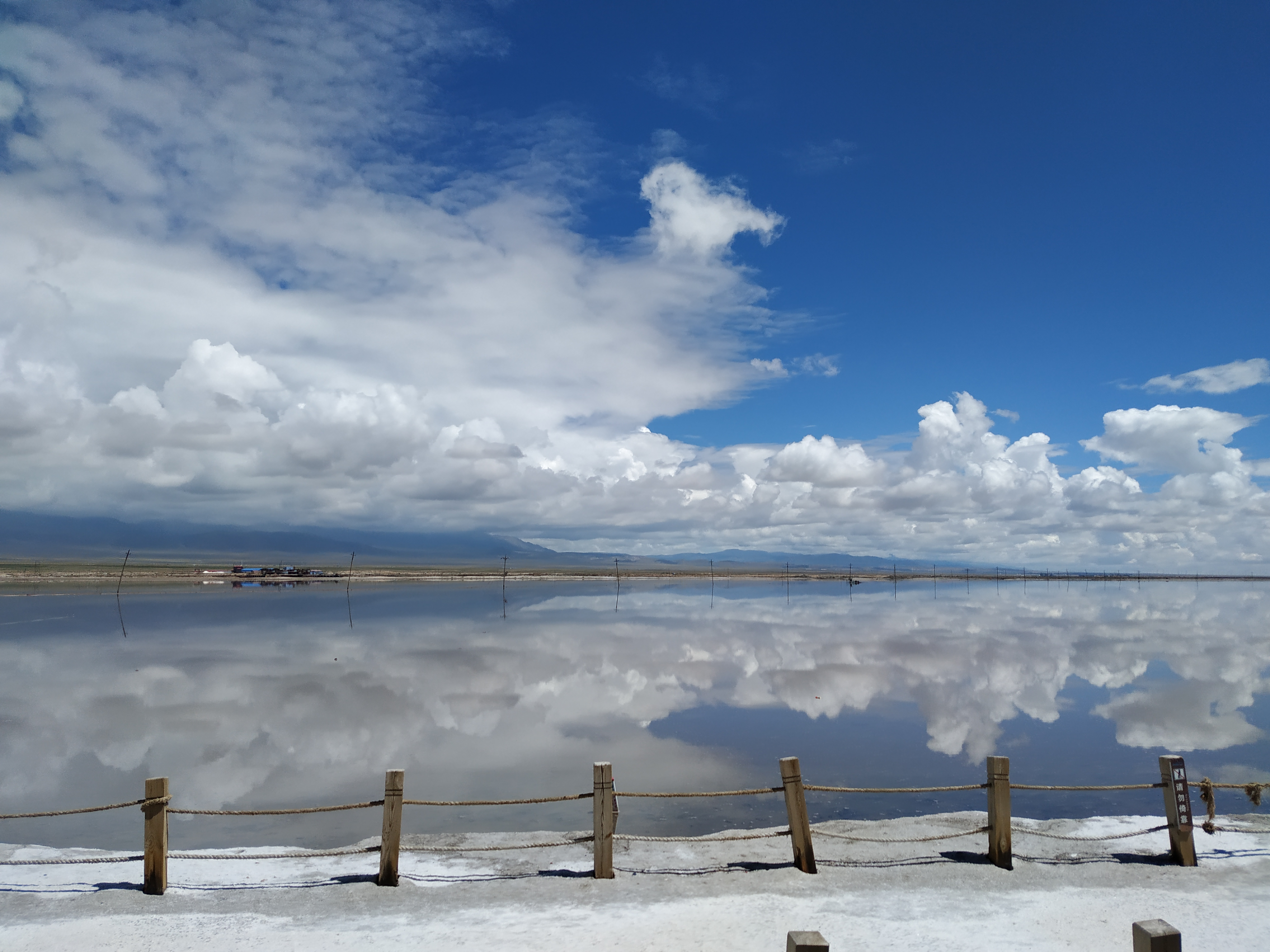

- Location within Qinghai
- Location: Ulan County, Haixi Prefecture, Qinghai Province, China
- Coordinates: 36°41′51″N 99°06′20″E
- Type: Salt lake
- Basin countries: China
- Max. length: 15.8 km (9.8 mi)
- Max. width: 9.2 km (5.7 mi)
- Surface area: 105 km^{2} (41 sq mi)
- Surface elevation: 3,100 m (10,170 ft)
- Settlements: Chaka, Ulan County

Chaka Salt Lake (Chinese: 茶卡盐湖; pinyin: Chákǎ Yánhú; Standard Tibetan: ཚྭ་ཁ་མཚོ་) is a salt lake in Ulan County, Haixi Prefecture, Qinghai, China. The oval lake is located near the eastern end of Qaidam Basin, 298 kilometres (185 mi) to the west of the provincial capital Xining. The name "Chaka" (ཚྭ་ཁ) means "salt lake" in Tibetan.

A branch railway connects the town of Chaka to the Qinghai–Tibet railway. Originally constructed for transporting salt, the line is nowadays used by tourist trains from Xining, with a travel time of over 4 hours.

Chaka Lake is a major tourist destination and a key salt mine in Qinghai. In 2018, it received more than 3 million visitors. The lake is famous for its crystal-blue water and reflective lake bed, and is popularly known as "Mirror of the Sky".

== Climate ==
Climate data for Chaka, Ulan County, elevation 3,088 m (10,131 ft), (1991–2020 normals)
Month	Jan	Feb	Mar	Apr	May	Jun	Jul	Aug	Sep	Oct	Nov	Dec	Year
Mean daily maximum °C (°F)	−2.2 (28.0)	1.7 (35.1)	6.8 (44.2)	12.7 (54.9)	16.6 (61.9)	19.2 (66.6)	21.5 (70.7)	21.3 (70.3)	17.2 (63.0)	10.9 (51.6)	4.1 (39.4)	−1.0 (30.2)	10.7 (51.3)
Daily mean °C (°F)	−10.9 (12.4)	−7.1 (19.2)	−1.8 (28.8)	4.5 (40.1)	9.2 (48.6)	12.5 (54.5)	14.9 (58.8)	14.3 (57.7)	9.9 (49.8)	2.6 (36.7)	−5.0 (23.0)	−9.8 (14.4)	2.8 (37.0)
Mean daily minimum °C (°F)	−18.2 (−0.8)	−14.7 (5.5)	−9.2 (15.4)	−3.3 (26.1)	2.1 (35.8)	6.4 (43.5)	9.0 (48.2)	8.4 (47.1)	4.1 (39.4)	−4.1 (24.6)	−12.1 (10.2)	−16.9 (1.6)	−4.0 (24.7)
Average precipitation mm (inches)	1.2 (0.05)	1.8 (0.07)	3.3 (0.13)	7.5 (0.30)	26.3 (1.04)	51.3 (2.02)	58.8 (2.31)	48.2 (1.90)	27.2 (1.07)	4.9 (0.19)	1.4 (0.06)	0.5 (0.02)	232.4 (9.16)
Average precipitation days (≥ 0.1 mm)	1.9	2.0	2.7	3.6	8.4	12.2	13.6	11.0	7.8	2.6	0.9	0.7	67.4
Average snowy days	2.8	2.9	4.3	4.0	2.4	0.2	0	0	0	1.8	1.7	1.2	21.3
Average relative humidity (%)	36	33	31	33	44	55	59	58	56	43	35	35	43
Mean monthly sunshine hours	231.2	221.4	255.2	269.9	267.5	233.5	248.5	253.2	235.7	261.3	245.1	233.5	2,956
Percentage possible sunshine	75	72	68	68	61	53	56	61	64	76	81	78	68
Source: China Meteorological Administration
