= Soltaniyeh Castle =

Castle in Zanjan Province, Iran

Soltaniyeh castle
- قلعه سلطانیه
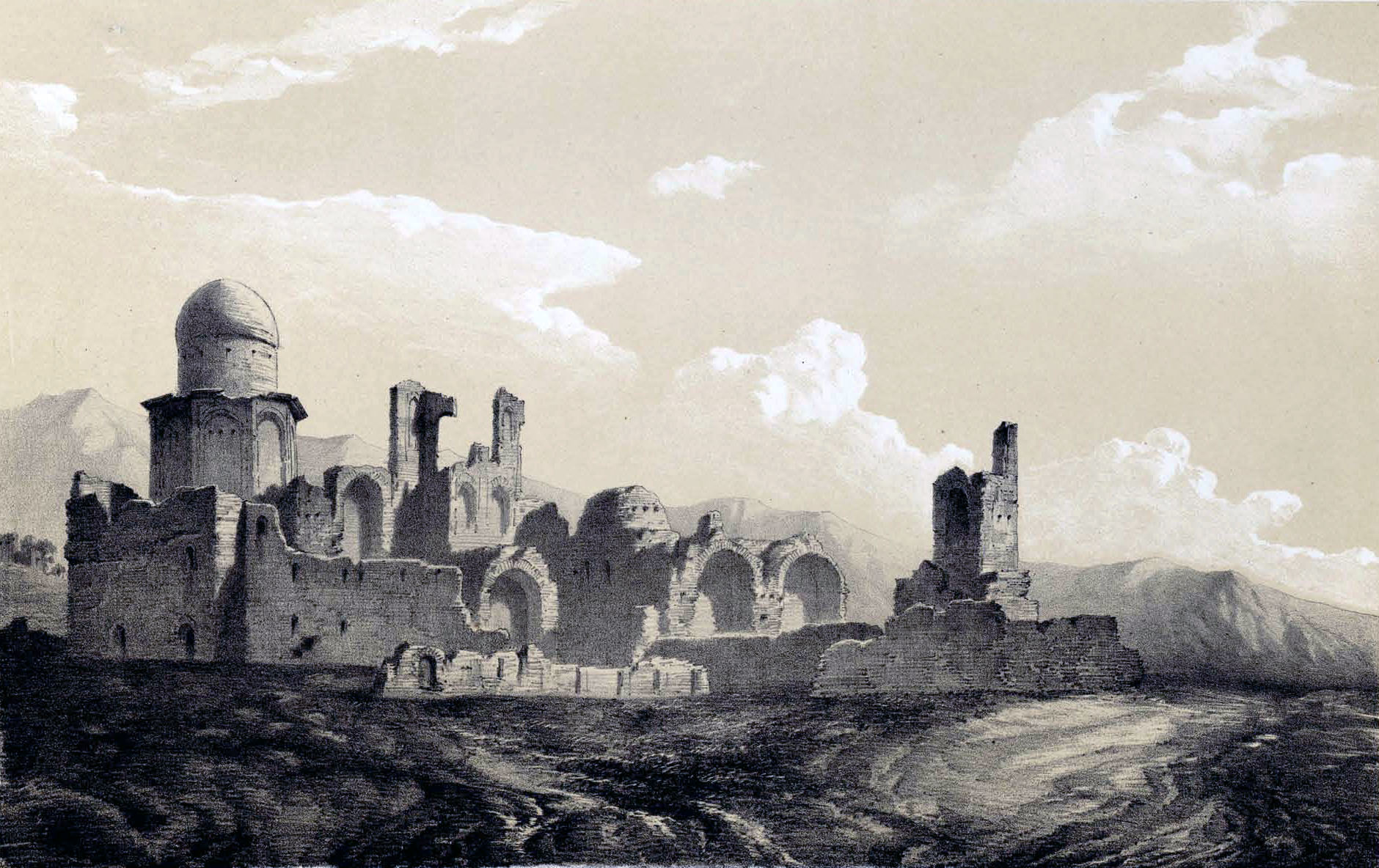

General information
- Type: Castle
- Location: Soltaniyeh, Iran

Soltaniyeh castle (Persian: قلعه سلطانیه) is a historical castle located in Soltaniyeh County in Zanjan Province, The longevity of this fortress dates back to the 1st millennium BC.
