= Tahmasababad =

Tahmasababad or Tahmasebabad (Persian: طهماسب اباد) may refer to:

- Tahmasebabad, Ardabil
- Tahmasebabad, Qazvin
- Tahmasababad, Zanjan
