= Qarah Bolagh Rural District (Soltaniyeh County) =

Rural district in Zanjan province, Iran

Qarah Bolagh Rural District Persian: دهستان قره بلاغ
- Rural District
- Location within Iran
- Coordinates: 36°36′N 48°52′E
- Country: Iran
- Province: Zanjan
- County: Soltaniyeh
- District: Bagh Helli
- Established: 2013
- Capital: Qarah Bolagh

Population (2016)
  - Total: 4,794
- Time zone: UTC+3:30 (IRST)

Qarah Bolagh Rural District (Persian: دهستان قره بلاغ) is in Bagh Helli District of Soltaniyeh County, Zanjan province, Iran. Its capital is the village of Qarah Bolagh, which was previously the capital of Soltaniyeh Rural District.

== History ==
In 2013, Soltaniyeh District was separated from Abhar County in the establishment of Soltaniyeh County and Qarah Bolagh Rural District was created in the new Bagh Helli District.

== Demographics ==
=== Population ===
At the time of the 2016 National Census, the rural district's population was 4,794 in 1,552 households. The most populous of its 19 villages was Kheyrabad, with 2,764 people.

=== Other villages in the rural district ===
- Amirabad
- Aqzuj
- Baranqur
- Buji
- Cham Rud
- Chammeh
- Kakaabad
- Kangeh
- Parangin
- Qeshlaq
- Sorkheh Dizaj
- Vanunan
- Yusefabad
