= Buyin =

Buyin may refer to:

- Buyin, an alternate name of Buin Zahra, a city in Iran
- Buyin, Zanjan, a village in Zanjan Province, Iran
- BUYIN, a procurement joint-venture by Deutsche Telekom and Orange
- "Buy-in", a poker term, see: Glossary of poker terms#buy-in
- The purchase of a company by a new manager or management team, see Management buy-in
