= Shakurabad =

Village in Zanjan province, Iran

Shakurabad Persian: شکورآباد
- Village
- Location within Iran
- Coordinates: 36°26′38″N 48°40′47″E
- Country: Iran
- Province: Zanjan
- County: Soltaniyeh
- District: Bagh Helli
- Rural District: Guzal Darreh

Population (2016)
  - Total: 1,014
- Time zone: UTC+3:30 (IRST)

Shakurabad (Persian: شکورآباد) (Note: Also romanized as Shakūrābād and Shokūrābād; also known as Shokrābād and Shukrabad) is a village in Guzal Darreh Rural District of Bagh Helli District in Soltaniyeh County, Zanjan province, Iran.

== Demographics ==
=== Population ===
At the time of the 2006 National Census, the village's population was 743 in 182 households, when it was in the former Soltaniyeh District of Abhar County. The following census in 2011 counted 933 people in 251 households. The 2016 census measured the population of the village as 1,014 people in 302 households, by which time the district had been separated from the county in the establishment of Soltaniyeh County. The rural district was transferred to the new Bagh Helli District.
