= Wandan =

Wandan may refer to:

- Wandan, Iran, in Zanjan Province, Iran
- Wandan, Pingtung, Taiwan
