= Salman Kandi =

Salman Kandi (Persian: سلمان كندي) may refer to:

- Salman Kandi, Meshgin Shahr
- Salman Kandi, Parsabad, Ardabil Province
- Salman Kandi, East Azerbaijan
- Salman Kandi, Zanjan
