= Buji =

Buji may refer to:

- Buji, Iran, a village in Zanjan Province, Iran
- Buji, Jigawa, a Local Government Area of Jigawa State, Nigeria
- Buji language (Nigeria), a language spoken in Bassa Local Government Area of Plateau State, Nigeria
- Buji station, a metro station in Shenzhen
- Buji Subdistrict, a sub-district of Longgang, Shenzhen, China
- Buji Town, a disestablished town in Longgang, Shenzhen, China
- Isaac Herzog, Israeli politician

== See also ==
- Bujji, a fictional character in the 2024 Indian sci-fi film Kalki 2898 AD
