= Xireg =

- Town
- Location in China
- Coordinates: 36.925°N 98.478°E
- Country: China
- Province: Qinghai
- District: Ulan County
- Time zone: UTC+8 (China Standard Time)

Xireg

Chinese name
- Simplified Chinese: 希里沟镇
Transcriptions
Standard Mandarin
- Hanyu Pinyin: Xīlǐgōu Zhèn

Mongolian name
- Mongolian Cyrillic: Ширх балгас
- Mongolian script: ᠰᠢᠷᠢᠭᠢ ᠪᠠᠯᠭᠠᠰᠤ
Transcriptions
- SASM/GNC: sirigi balɣasu

Xireg (Chinese: 希里沟镇; pinyin: Xīlǐgōu Zhèn, Mongolian: ᠰᠢᠷᠢᠭᠢ ᠪᠠᠯᠭᠠᠰᠤ, romanized: sirigi balɣasu) is a town in and county seat of Ulan County in Qinghai province, China. The town is located in a fertile valley. Wulan railway station and the G315 highway connects the town to other parts of China.
