= Ulaan =

Ulaan (Mongolian: Улаан, red, Chinese: 乌兰) may refer to:

- Wulan County, Qinghai, China
- Ulaan Taiga, a mountain range in north Mongolia

== See also ==
- Ulan (disambiguation)
