= Guzal Darreh, Zanjan =

City in Zanjan province, Iran

Guzal Darreh Persian: گوزل دره
- Village
- Location within Iran
- Coordinates: 36°29′08″N 48°38′13″E
- Country: Iran
- Province: Zanjan
- County: Soltaniyeh
- District: Bagh Helli
- Established as a city: 2024

Population (2016)
  - Total: 1,532
- Time zone: UTC+3:30 (IRST)

Guzal Darreh (Persian: گوزلدره) (Note: Also romanized as Gowzal Darreh; formerly the village of Guzal Darreh-ye Sofla (گوزلدره سفلي), also romanized as Gowzal Darreh Soflā, Gowzaldareh Soflā, and Gūzal Darreh-ye Soflá; also known as Gowzal Darreh-ye Pā’īn, Gowzaldareh Pā’īn, Gozal Darreh, Gozal Darreh-ye Pā’īn, Gozaldarreh-ye Pā’īn, Gozaldarreh-ye Soflá, Qezel Darreh, and Qizil Darreh) is a city in, and the capital of, Bagh Helli District of Soltaniyeh County, Zanjan province, Iran. It also serves as the administrative center for Guzal Darreh Rural District.

== Demographics ==
=== Population ===
At the time of the 2006 National Census, the population was 1,604 in 489 households, when it was the village of Guzal Darreh-ye Sofla in Guzal Darreh Rural District of the former Soltaniyeh District in Abhar County. The following census in 2011 counted 1,448 people in 484 households. The 2016 census measured the population of the village as 1,532 people in 542 households, by which time the district had been separated from the county in the establishment of Soltaniyeh County. The rural district was transferred to the new Bagh Helli District. Guzal Darreh-ye Sofla was the most populous village in its rural district.

The village was converted to a city as Guzal Darreh in 2024.
