= Chaka, Ulan County =

Chaka 茶卡镇
- Town
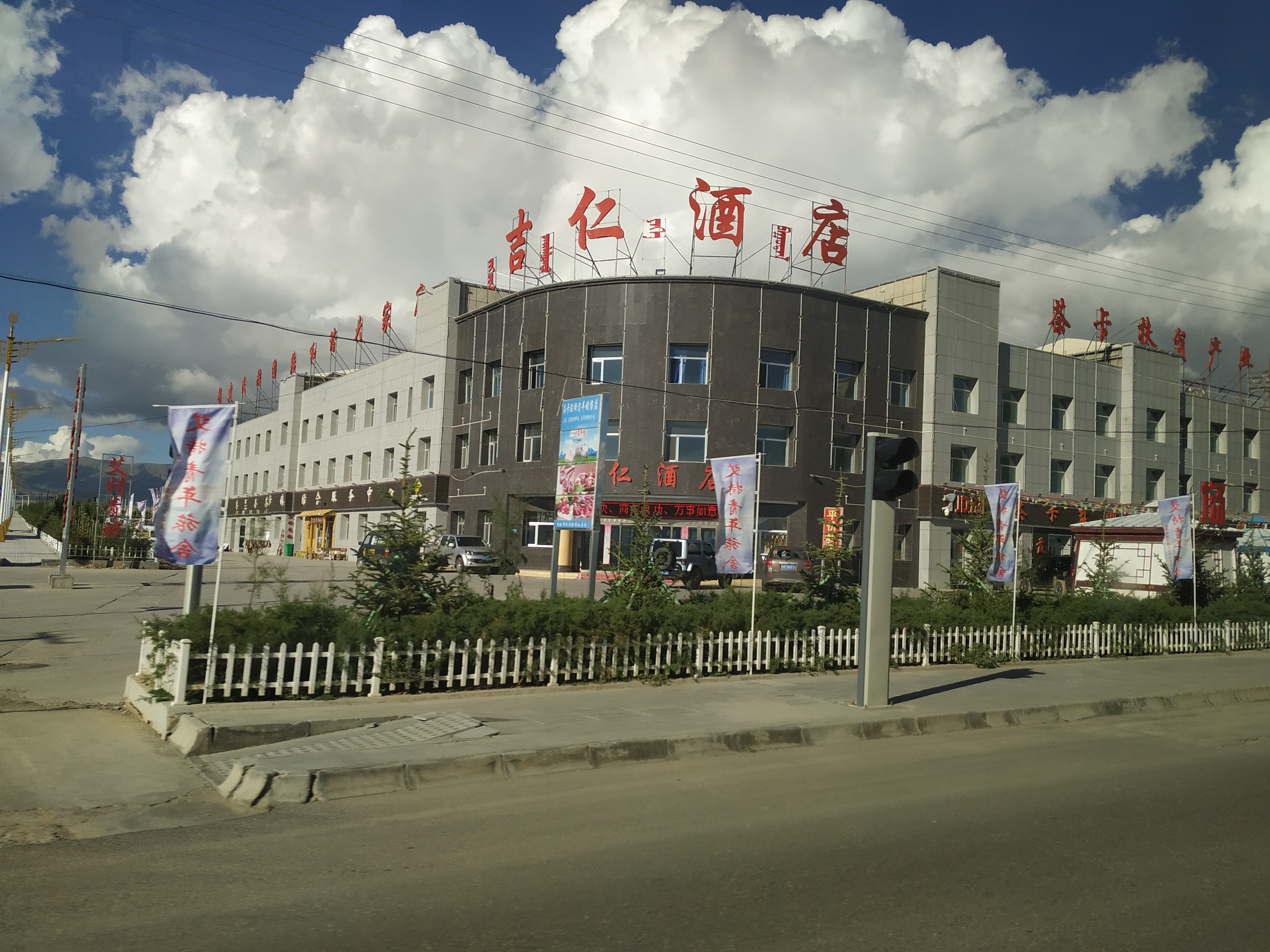
- Chaka

- Location in Qinghai
- Coordinates: 36°47′48″N 99°05′09″E
- Country: People's Republic of China
- Province: Qinghai
- Autonomous prefecture: Haixi Mongol and Tibetan Autonomous Prefecture
- County: Ulan County

Area
  - Total: 142.43 km^{2} (54.99 sq mi)
- Elevation: 3,059 m (10,036 ft)

Population (2015)
  - Total: 2,100
  - Density: 15/km^{2} (38/sq mi)
- Time zone: UTC+08:00 (China Standard)
- Postal code: 817101
- Area code: 0977

Chaka Town (simplified Chinese: 茶卡镇; traditional Chinese: 茶卡鎮; pinyin: Chákǎ Zhèn) is a rural town in Ulan County, Qinghai, China. As of the 2015 census it had a population of 2,100 and an area of 142.43-square-kilometre (54.99 sq mi). The Han, Hui, Mongolian and Tibetan live here.

== History ==
After the establishment of the Communist State, it was renamed Chaka Commune in 1959.

It was upgraded to a town in 1985.

On October 14, 2016, it was listed among the first group of "Small towns with Chinese characteristics" by the State Council of China.

== Geography ==
The Chaka Salt Lake (Chinese: 茶卡盐湖) located within the town.

== Climate ==
Climate data for Chaka, Ulan County, elevation 3,088 m (10,131 ft), (1991–2020 normals)
Month	Jan	Feb	Mar	Apr	May	Jun	Jul	Aug	Sep	Oct	Nov	Dec	Year
Mean daily maximum °C (°F)	−2.2 (28.0)	1.7 (35.1)	6.8 (44.2)	12.7 (54.9)	16.6 (61.9)	19.2 (66.6)	21.5 (70.7)	21.3 (70.3)	17.2 (63.0)	10.9 (51.6)	4.1 (39.4)	−1.0 (30.2)	10.7 (51.3)
Daily mean °C (°F)	−10.9 (12.4)	−7.1 (19.2)	−1.8 (28.8)	4.5 (40.1)	9.2 (48.6)	12.5 (54.5)	14.9 (58.8)	14.3 (57.7)	9.9 (49.8)	2.6 (36.7)	−5.0 (23.0)	−9.8 (14.4)	2.8 (37.0)
Mean daily minimum °C (°F)	−18.2 (−0.8)	−14.7 (5.5)	−9.2 (15.4)	−3.3 (26.1)	2.1 (35.8)	6.4 (43.5)	9.0 (48.2)	8.4 (47.1)	4.1 (39.4)	−4.1 (24.6)	−12.1 (10.2)	−16.9 (1.6)	−4.0 (24.7)
Average precipitation mm (inches)	1.2 (0.05)	1.8 (0.07)	3.3 (0.13)	7.5 (0.30)	26.3 (1.04)	51.3 (2.02)	58.8 (2.31)	48.2 (1.90)	27.2 (1.07)	4.9 (0.19)	1.4 (0.06)	0.5 (0.02)	232.4 (9.16)
Average precipitation days (≥ 0.1 mm)	1.9	2.0	2.7	3.6	8.4	12.2	13.6	11.0	7.8	2.6	0.9	0.7	67.4
Average snowy days	2.8	2.9	4.3	4.0	2.4	0.2	0	0	0	1.8	1.7	1.2	21.3
Average relative humidity (%)	36	33	31	33	44	55	59	58	56	43	35	35	43
Mean monthly sunshine hours	231.2	221.4	255.2	269.9	267.5	233.5	248.5	253.2	235.7	261.3	245.1	233.5	2,956
Percentage possible sunshine	75	72	68	68	61	53	56	61	64	76	81	78	68
Source: China Meteorological Administration

== Economy ==
Beef and mutton are important to the economy.

== Transportation ==
The G6 Beijing–Lhasa Expressway passes across the town east to west.

The Chaka railway station serves the town. Chaka railway is a branch line of Qinghai–Tibet railway.

== Culture ==
The area was used for location filming of the 2018 romantic comedy film Love in Chaka (Chinese: 追爱茶卡).

== Gallery ==
Street landscape in Chaka Town.

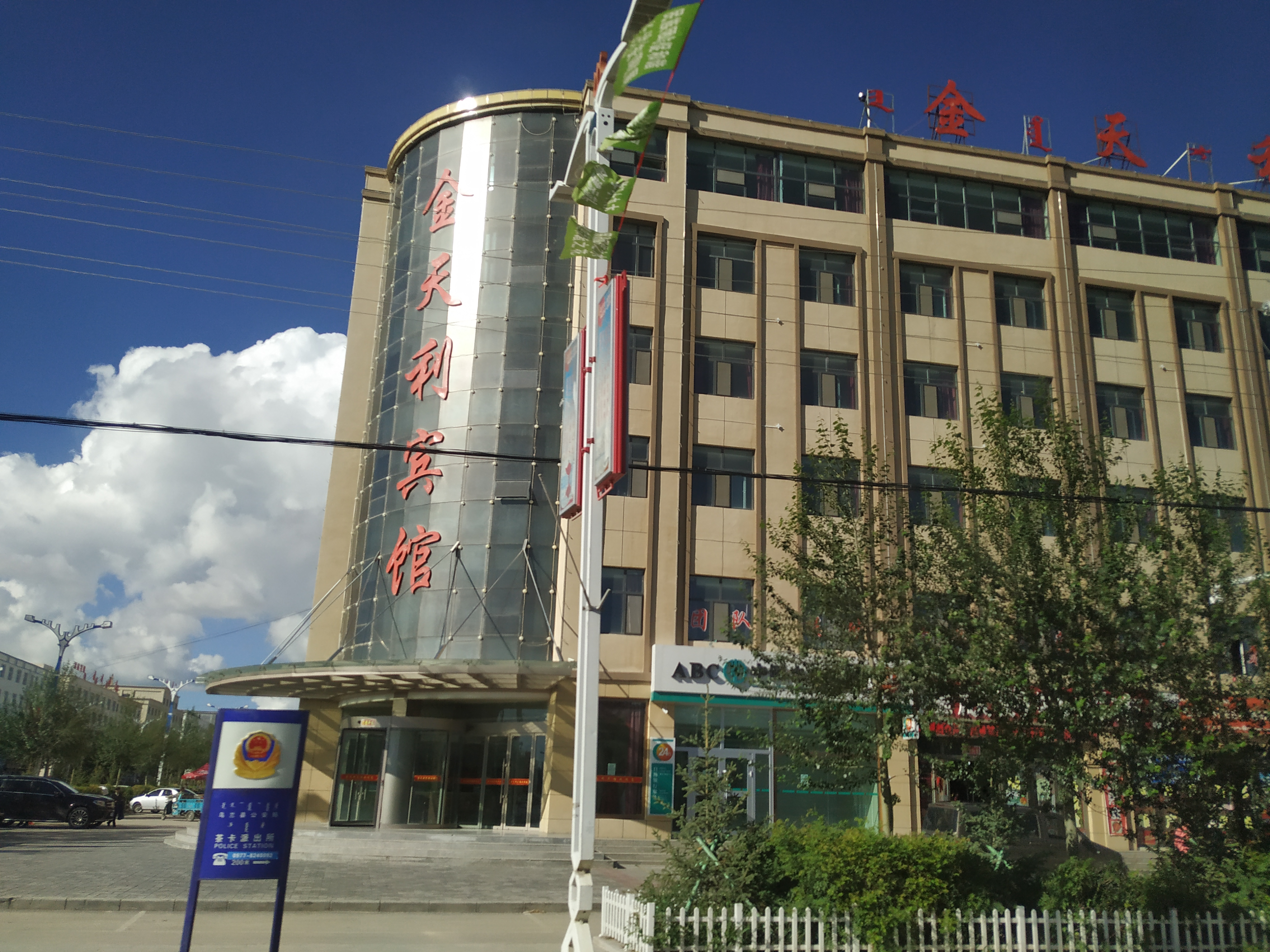
Street landscape in Chaka Town.

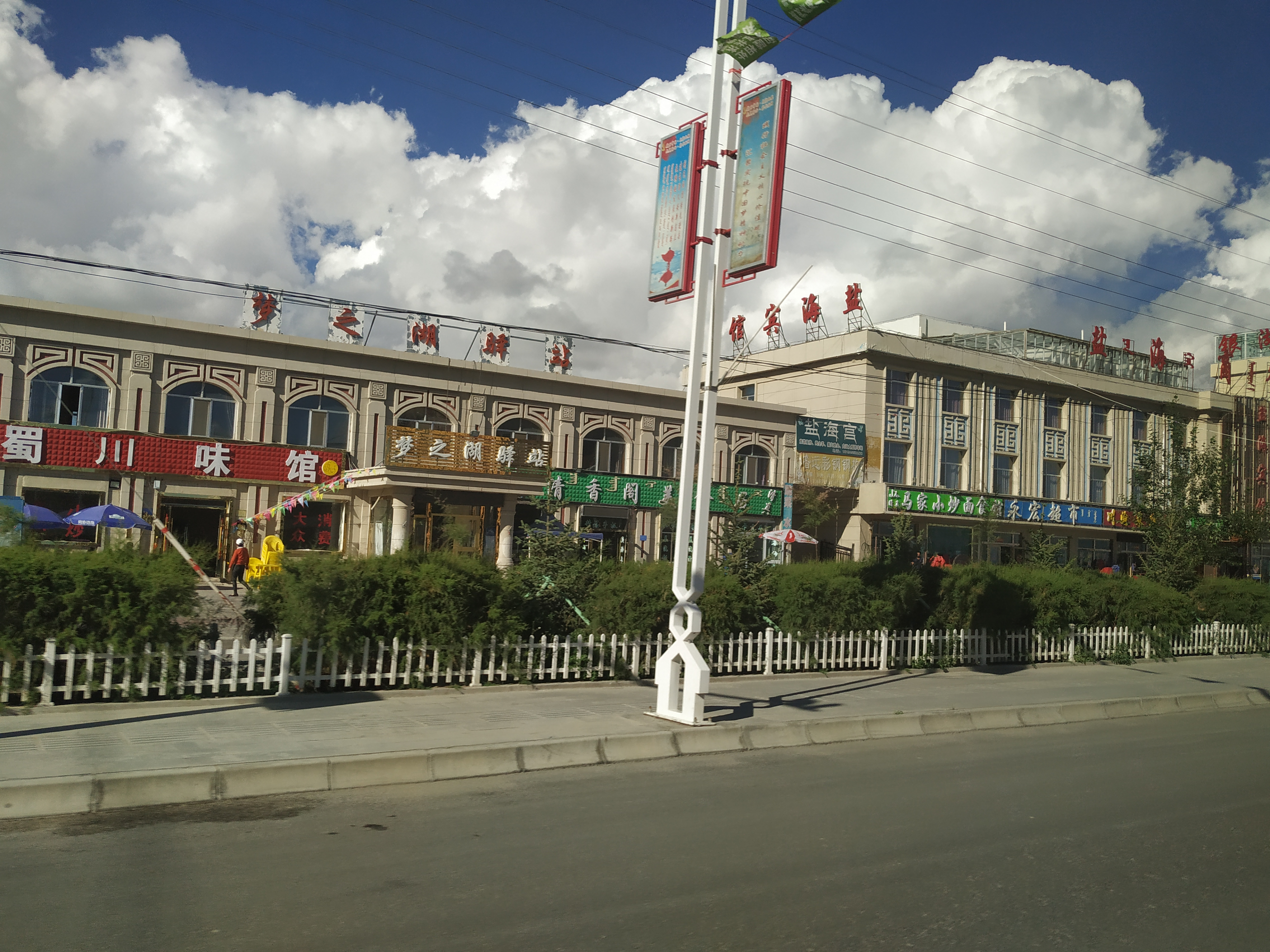
Street landscape in Chaka Town.

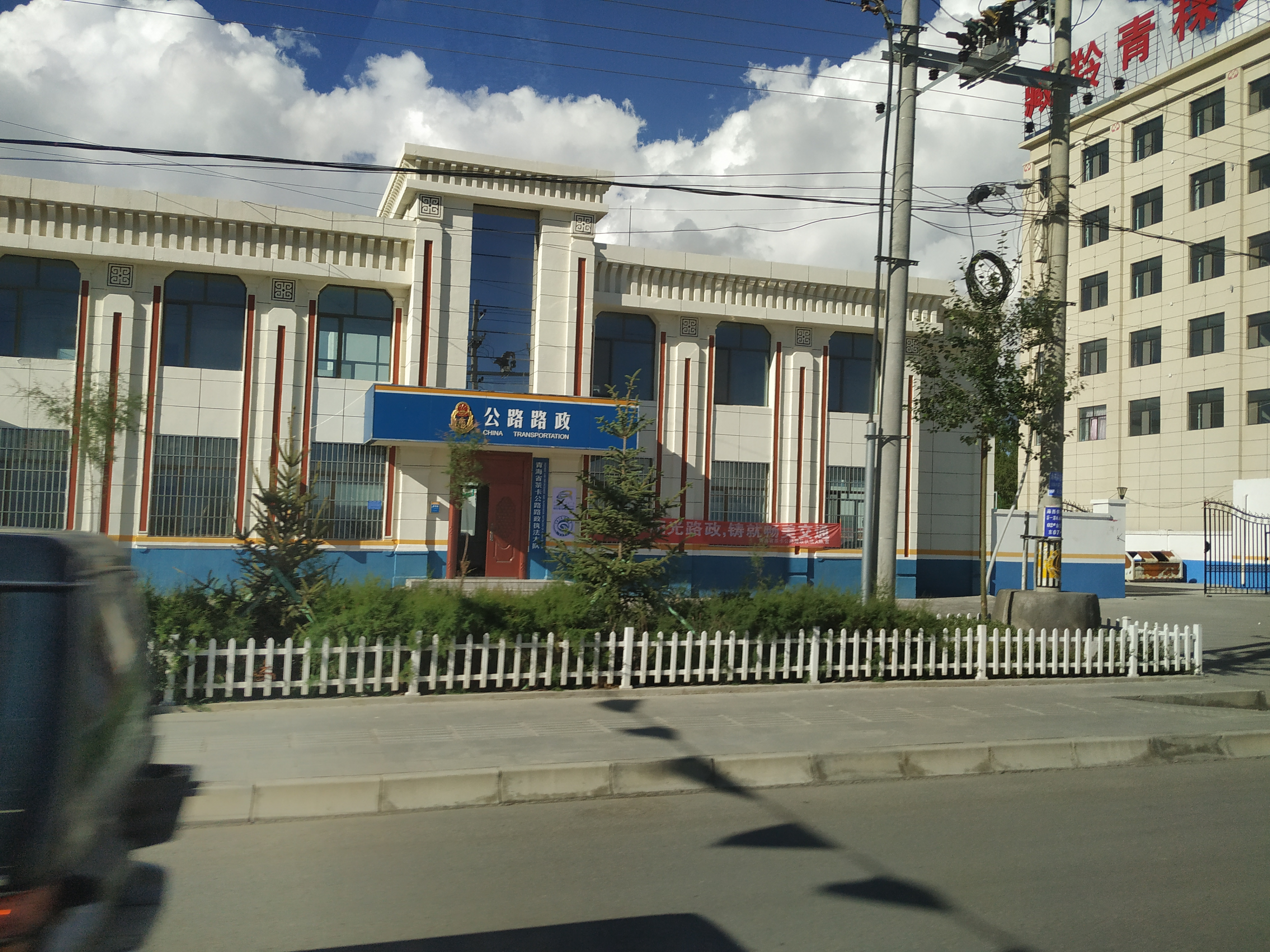
Street landscape in Chaka Town.

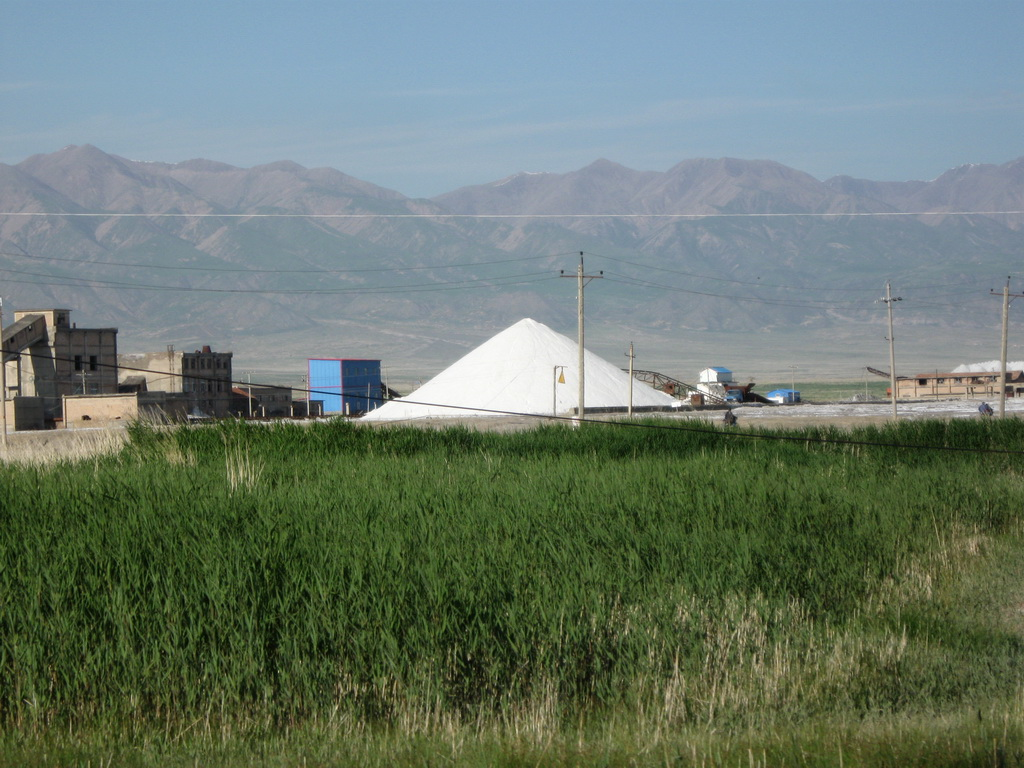
Saltworks by Chaka Salt Lake

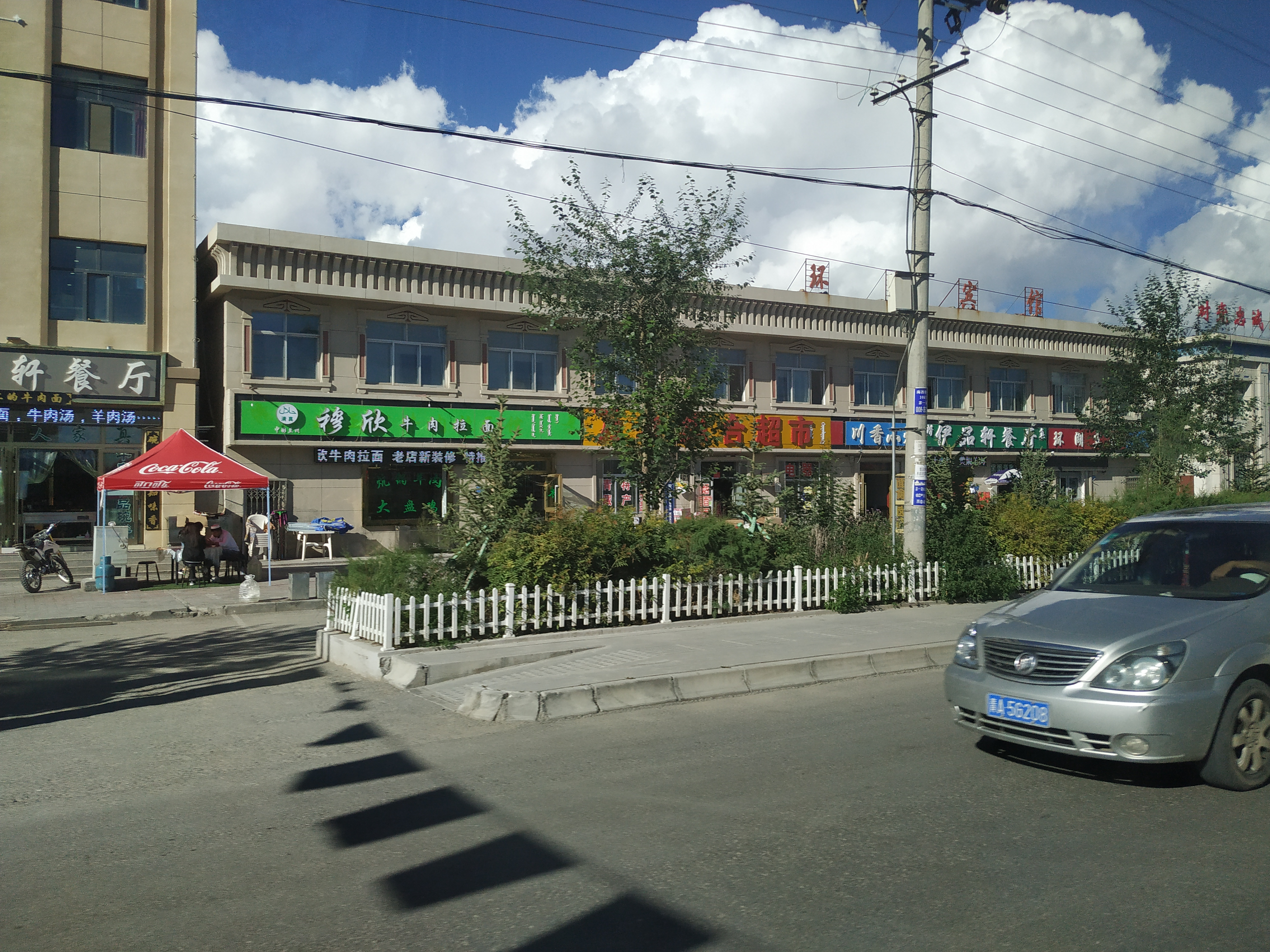
Street landscape in Chaka Town.
