= Cham Rud, Kermanshah =

Cham Rud چم رود
- Village
- Location within Iran
- Coordinates: 34°45′49″N 46°12′27″E
- Country: Iran
- Province: Kermanshah
- County: Salas-e Babajani
- Bakhsh: Central
- Rural District: Zamkan

Population (2006)
  - Total: 74
- Time zone: UTC+3:30 (IRST)
  - Summer (DST): UTC+4:30 (IRDT)

Cham Rud (Persian: چم رود, also Romanized as Cham Rūd; also known as Bakhīmīrī) is a village in Zamkan Rural District, in the Central District of Salas-e Babajani County, Kermanshah Province, Iran. At the 2006 census, its population was 74, in 17 families.
