= Guzal Darreh Rural District =

Rural district in Zanjan province, Iran

Guzal Darreh Rural District Persian: دهستان گوزل دره
- Rural District
- Location within Iran
- Coordinates: 36°28′N 48°39′E
- Country: Iran
- Province: Zanjan
- County: Soltaniyeh
- District: Bagh Helli
- Established: 1987
- Capital: Guzal Darreh

Population (2016)
  - Total: 4,794
- Time zone: UTC+3:30 (IRST)

Guzal Darreh Rural District (Persian: دهستان گوزل دره) is in Bagh Helli District of Soltaniyeh County, Zanjan province, Iran. It is administered from the city of Guzal Darreh.

== Demographics ==
=== Population ===
At the time of the 2006 National Census, the rural district's population (as a part of the former Soltaniyeh District in Abhar County) was 4,959 in 1,324 households. There were 4,864 inhabitants in 1,451 households at the following census of 2011. The 2016 census measured the population of the rural district as 4,794 in 1,552 households, by which time the district had been separated from the county in the establishment of Soltaniyeh County. The rural district was transferred to the new Bagh Helli District. The most populous of its 10 villages was Guzal Darreh-ye Sofla (now the city of Guzal Darreh), with 1,532 people.

=== Other villages in the rural district ===
- Khorram Daraq
- Kor Daraq
- Kordenab
- Sabz Daraq
- Salman Kandi
- Sarijalu
- Shakurabad
