= Chameh, Kermanshah =

Chameh چمه
- Village
- Location within Iran
- Coordinates: 34°34′03″N 47°28′53″E
- Country: Iran
- Province: Kermanshah
- County: Sahneh
- Bakhsh: Dinavar
- Rural District: Dinavar

Population (2006)
  - Total: 584
- Time zone: UTC+3:30 (IRST)
  - Summer (DST): UTC+4:30 (IRDT)

Chameh (Persian: چمه, also Romanized as Chemeh) is a village in Dinavar Rural District, Dinavar District, Sahneh County, Kermanshah Province, Iran. At the 2006 census, its population was 584, in 157 families.
