= Shekarabad, Dorud =

Shekarabad شکرآباد
- Village
- Location within Iran
- Coordinates: 33°35′24″N 49°00′28″E
- Country: Iran
- Province: Lorestan
- County: Dorud
- Bakhsh: Central
- Rural District: Dorud

Population (2006)
  - Total: 122
- Time zone: UTC+3:30 (IRST)
  - Summer (DST): UTC+4:30 (IRDT)

Shekarabad (Persian: شکرآباد, also Romanized as Shekarābād and Shakarābād) is a village in Dorud Rural District, in the Central District of Dorud County, Lorestan Province, Iran. At the 2006 census, its population was 122, in 26 families.
