= Sorkheh Dizaj, East Azerbaijan =

Sorkheh Dizaj سرخه ديزج
- Village
- Location within Iran
- Coordinates: 38°35′29″N 46°32′54″E
- Country: Iran
- Province: East Azerbaijan
- County: Varzaqan
- Bakhsh: Central
- Rural District: Ozomdel-e Jonubi

Population (2006)
  - Total: 496
- Time zone: UTC+3:30 (IRST)
  - Summer (DST): UTC+4:30 (IRDT)

Sorkheh Dizaj (Persian: سرخه ديزج, also Romanized as Sorkheh Dīzaj; also known as Sirkhazach) is a village in Ozomdel-e Jonubi Rural District, in the Central District of Varzaqan County, East Azerbaijan Province, Iran. At the 2006 census, its population was 496, in 101 families.
