= Shekarabad, Ardal =

Shekarabad شكراباد
- Village
- Location within Iran
- Coordinates: 32°07′18″N 50°31′08″E
- Country: Iran
- Province: Chaharmahal and Bakhtiari
- County: Ardal
- Bakhsh: Central
- Rural District: Poshtkuh

Population (2006)
  - Total: 241
- Time zone: UTC+3:30 (IRST)
  - Summer (DST): UTC+4:30 (IRDT)

Shekarabad (Persian: شكراباد, also Romanized as Shekarābād; also known as Shekar Āb) is a village in Poshtkuh Rural District, in the Central District of Ardal County, Chaharmahal and Bakhtiari Province, Iran. At the 2006 census, its population was 241, in 48 families. The village is populated by Lurs.
