= Chah Darreh, Mashhad =

Chah Darreh چاه دره
- Village
- Location within Iran
- Coordinates: 36°31′57″N 59°37′10″E
- Country: Iran
- Province: Razavi Khorasan
- County: Mashhad
- Bakhsh: Central
- Rural District: Tabadkan

Population (2006)
  - Total: 394
- Time zone: UTC+3:30 (IRST)
  - Summer (DST): UTC+4:30 (IRDT)

Chah Darreh (Persian: چاه دره, also Romanized as Chāh Darreh; also known as Chāy Darreh and Chāy Darreh-e Qal‘eh-ye Now) is a village in Tabadkan Rural District, in the Central District of Mashhad County, Razavi Khorasan Province, Iran. At the 2006 census, its population was 394, in 110 families.
