= Sonbolabad Rural District =

Rural district in Zanjan province, Iran

Sonbolabad Rural District Persian: دهستان سنبل آباد
- Rural District
- Location within Iran
- Coordinates: 36°24′N 48°53′E
- Country: Iran
- Province: Zanjan
- County: Soltaniyeh
- District: Central
- Established: 1987
- Capital: Sonbolabad

Population (2016)
  - Total: 8,318
- Time zone: UTC+3:30 (IRST)

Sonbolabad Rural District (Persian: دهستان سنبل آباد) is in the Central District of Soltaniyeh County, Zanjan province, Iran. Its capital is the village of Sonbolabad.

== Demographics ==
=== Population ===
At the time of the 2006 National Census, the rural district's population (as a part of the former Soltaniyeh District in Abhar County) was 8,069 in 2,050 households. There were 7,956 inhabitants in 2,381 households at the following census of 2011. The 2016 census measured the population of the rural district as 8,318 in 2,582 households, by which time the district had been separated from the county in the establishment of Soltaniyeh County. The rural district was transferred to the new Central District. The most populous of its 15 villages was Viyar, with 3,548 people.

=== Other villages in the rural district ===
- Asadabad
- Buin
- Cheshmeh Sar
- Do Sangan
- Hoseynabad
- Qiasiyeh
- Torkandeh
- Valayesh
- Vik
