= Shekarabad, Baft =

Shekarabad شكراباد
- Village
- Country: Iran
- Province: Kerman
- County: Baft
- Bakhsh: Central
- Rural District: Fathabad

Population (2006)
  - Total: 58
- Time zone: UTC+3:30 (IRST)
  - Summer (DST): UTC+4:30 (IRDT)

Shekarabad (Persian: شكراباد, also Romanized as Shekarābād) is a village in Fathabad Rural District, in the Central District of Baft County, Kerman Province, Iran. At the 2006 census, its population was 58, in 15 families.
