= Sonbolabad, Qazvin =

Sonbolabad سنبل اباد
- Village
- Location within Iran
- Coordinates: 36°33′07″N 50°18′30″E
- Country: Iran
- Province: Qazvin
- County: Qazvin
- Bakhsh: Alamut-e Gharbi
- Rural District: Rudbar-e Mohammad-e Zamani

Population (2006)
  - Total: 169
- Time zone: UTC+3:30 (IRST)
  - Summer (DST): UTC+4:30 (IRDT)

Sonbolabad (Persian: سنبل اباد, also Romanized as Sonbolābād) is a village in Rudbar-e Mohammad-e Zamani Rural District, Alamut-e Gharbi District, Qazvin County, Qazvin Province, Iran. At the 2006 census, its population was 169, in 55 families.
