= Shekarabad, Selseleh =

Shekarabad شكراباد
- Village
- Location within Iran
- Coordinates: 33°51′32″N 48°12′50″E
- Country: Iran
- Province: Lorestan
- County: Selseleh
- Bakhsh: Central
- Rural District: Yusefvand

Population (2006)
  - Total: 174
- Time zone: UTC+3:30 (IRST)
  - Summer (DST): UTC+4:30 (IRDT)

Shekarabad (Persian: شكراباد, also Romanized as Shekarābād and Shokrābād) is a village in Yusefvand Rural District, in the Central District of Selseleh County, Lorestan Province, Iran. At the 2006 census, its population was 174, in 36 families.
