= Shekarabad, Manujan =

Shekarabad شكراباد
- Village
- Location within Iran
- Coordinates: 27°25′06″N 57°31′32″E
- Country: Iran
- Province: Kerman
- County: Manujan
- Bakhsh: Central
- Rural District: Qaleh

Population (2006)
  - Total: 455
- Time zone: UTC+3:30 (IRST)
  - Summer (DST): UTC+4:30 (IRDT)

Shekarabad (Persian: شكراباد, also Romanized as Shekarābād) is a village in Qaleh Rural District, in the Central District of Manujan County, Kerman Province, Iran. At the 2006 census, its population was 455, in 91 families.
