= Ulan County =

Ulan County ᠤᠯᠠᠭᠠᠨ ᠰᠢᠶᠠᠨ · དབུས་ལམ་རྫོང་། · 乌兰县 Wulan
- County
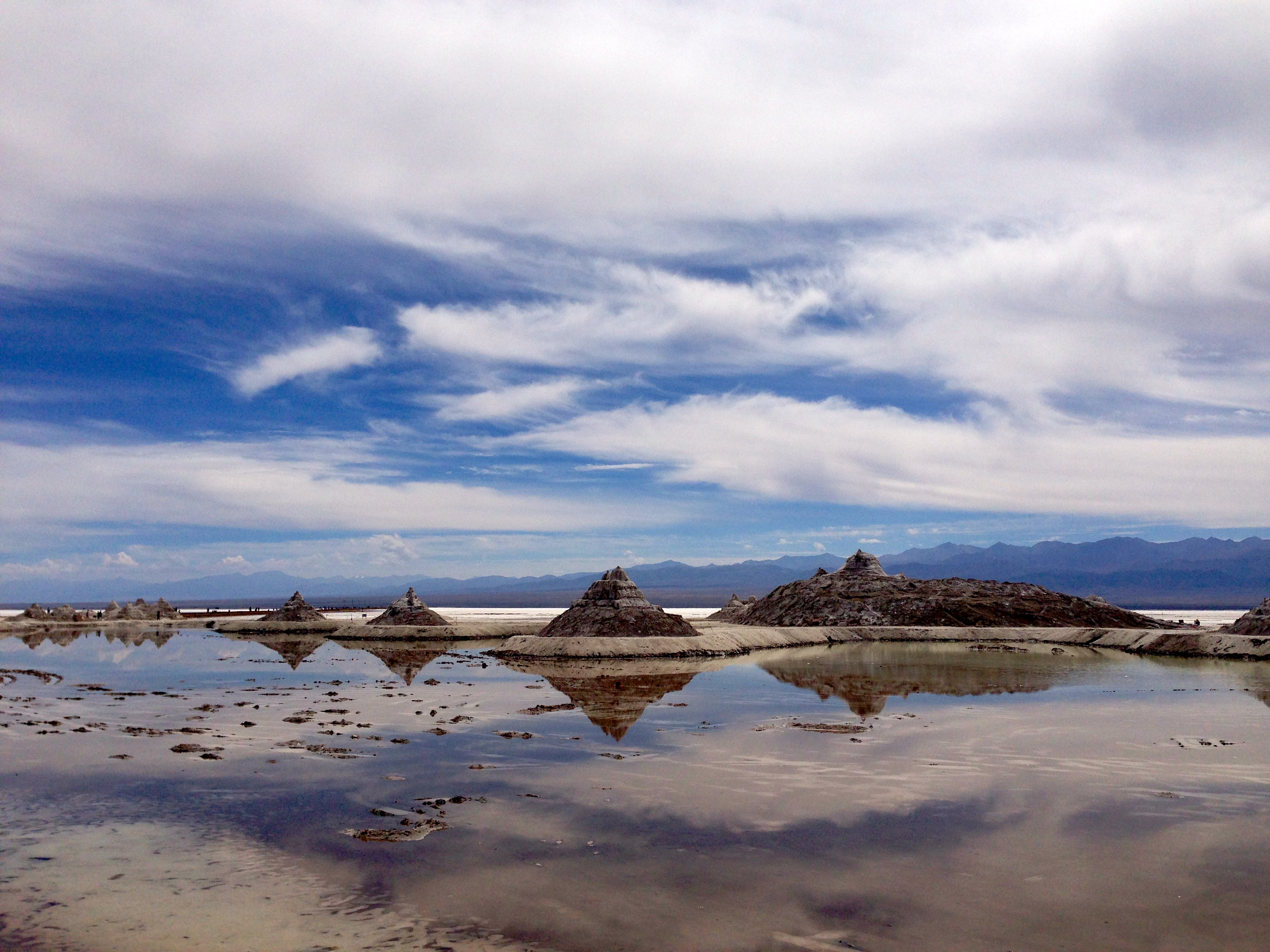
- Chaka Salt Lake, Ulan County

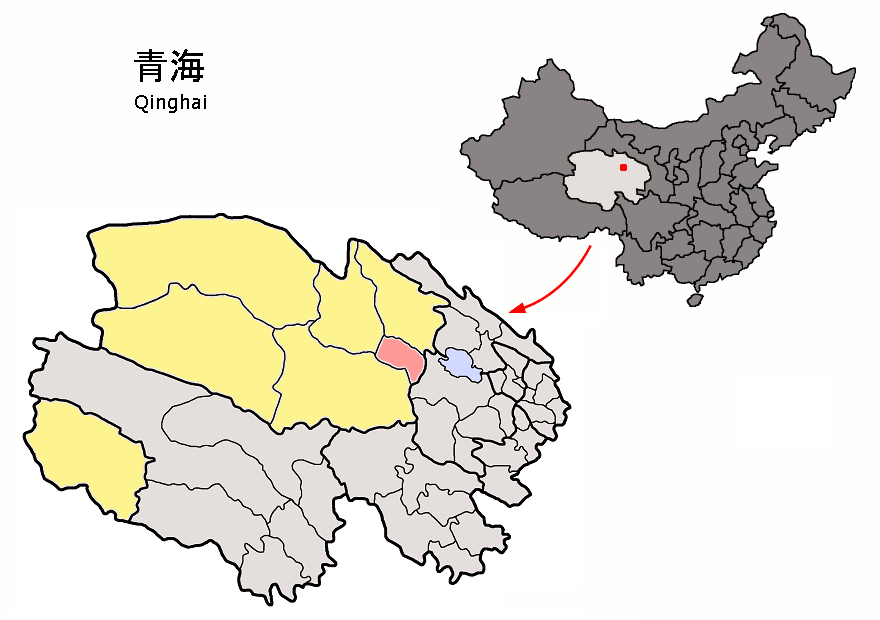
- Location of Ulan County (red) within Haixi Prefecture (yellow) and Qinghai

- Location of the county seat in Qinghai
- Coordinates: 36°49′N 98°17′E
- Country: China
- Province: Qinghai
- Autonomous prefecture: Haixi
- County seat: Xireg

Area
  - Total: 12,858.16 km^{2} (4,964.56 sq mi)

Population (2020)
  - Total: 31,507
  - Density: 2.4504/km^{2} (6.3464/sq mi)
- Time zone: UTC+8 (China Standard)
- Website: www.wulanxian.gov.cn

Ulan County

Chinese name
- Simplified Chinese: 乌兰县
- Traditional Chinese: 烏蘭縣
Transcriptions
Standard Mandarin
- Hanyu Pinyin: Wūlán Xiàn

Tibetan name
- Tibetan: དབུས་ལམ་རྫོང་།
Transcriptions
- Wylie: dbus lam rdzong
- Tibetan Pinyin: ü lam dzong

Mongolian name
- Mongolian script: ᠤᠯᠠᠭᠠᠨ ᠰᠢᠶᠠᠨ
Transcriptions
- SASM/GNC: Ulaγan siyan

Ulan or Wulan (Mongolian: ᠤᠯᠠᠭᠠᠨ ᠰᠢᠶᠠᠨ; Tibetan: དབུས་ལམ་རྫོང་།; Chinese: 乌兰县) is a county of Qinghai Province, China. It is under the administration of Haixi Mongol and Tibetan Autonomous Prefecture. County seat is Xireg.

The name of the county comes from a Mongolian word which means "red".

== Administrative divisions ==
Ulan County is divided into 4 towns.

| Name | Simplified Chinese | Hanyu Pinyin | Tibetan | Wylie | Mongolian (traditional script) | Mongolian (Cyrillic) | Administrative division code |
|---|---|---|---|---|---|---|---|
Towns
| Xireg Town (Xirig, Xiligou) | 希里沟镇 | Xīlǐgōu Zhèn | | | ᠰᠢᠷᠢᠭᠢ ᠪᠠᠯᠭᠠᠰᠤ | Ширх балгас | 632821100 |
| Qaka Town (Chaka, Caka) | 茶卡镇 | Chákǎ Zhèn | ཚྭ་ཁ་གྲོང་རྡལ། | tshwa kha grong rdal | ᠴᠠᠺᠠ ᠪᠠᠯᠭᠠᠰᠤ | Цака балгас | 632821101 |
| Hohod Town (Keke) | 柯柯镇 | Kēkē Zhèn | | | ᠬᠥᠬᠡᠳ ᠪᠠᠯᠭᠠᠰᠤ | Хээд балгас | 632821102 |
| Tongpu Town (Toinbo) | 铜普镇 | Tóngpǔ Zhèn | མཐོན་པོ་གྲོང་རྡལ། | mthon po grong rdal | ᠲᠤᠩᠫᠦ᠋ ᠪᠠᠯᠭᠠᠰᠤ | Тунпу балгас | 632821103 |

Other: Mohe Livestock Farm, Haixi Prefecture (海西州莫河畜牧场)

== Climate ==
Climate data for Ulan, elevation 2,950 m (9,680 ft), (1991–2020 normals, extremes 1991–present)
| Month | Jan | Feb | Mar | Apr | May | Jun | Jul | Aug | Sep | Oct | Nov | Dec | Year |
|---|---|---|---|---|---|---|---|---|---|---|---|---|---|
| Record high °C (°F) | 9.9 (49.8) | 14.1 (57.4) | 21.7 (71.1) | 28.5 (83.3) | 28.4 (83.1) | 30.2 (86.4) | 34.0 (93.2) | 33.1 (91.6) | 29.0 (84.2) | 24.0 (75.2) | 17.0 (62.6) | 11.1 (52.0) | 34.0 (93.2) |
| Mean daily maximum °C (°F) | −1.8 (28.8) | 2.7 (36.9) | 7.8 (46.0) | 13.8 (56.8) | 17.8 (64.0) | 20.8 (69.4) | 23.1 (73.6) | 23.0 (73.4) | 18.9 (66.0) | 12.2 (54.0) | 5.0 (41.0) | −0.6 (30.9) | 11.9 (53.4) |
| Daily mean °C (°F) | −10.6 (12.9) | −5.8 (21.6) | −0.1 (31.8) | 6.1 (43.0) | 10.8 (51.4) | 14.1 (57.4) | 16.2 (61.2) | 15.7 (60.3) | 11.3 (52.3) | 4.0 (39.2) | −3.6 (25.5) | −9.5 (14.9) | 4.1 (39.3) |
| Mean daily minimum °C (°F) | −17.2 (1.0) | −12.7 (9.1) | −6.8 (19.8) | −0.9 (30.4) | 3.9 (39.0) | 7.9 (46.2) | 10.2 (50.4) | 9.7 (49.5) | 5.4 (41.7) | −2.2 (28.0) | −9.9 (14.2) | −15.9 (3.4) | −2.4 (27.7) |
| Record low °C (°F) | −27.5 (−17.5) | −26.8 (−16.2) | −19.5 (−3.1) | −12.5 (9.5) | −6.2 (20.8) | −1.8 (28.8) | 2.2 (36.0) | −0.4 (31.3) | −4.2 (24.4) | −13.8 (7.2) | −20.2 (−4.4) | −28.3 (−18.9) | −28.3 (−18.9) |
| Average precipitation mm (inches) | 2.2 (0.09) | 2.2 (0.09) | 3.6 (0.14) | 6.9 (0.27) | 25.8 (1.02) | 43.1 (1.70) | 54.2 (2.13) | 38.3 (1.51) | 22.4 (0.88) | 4.6 (0.18) | 1.7 (0.07) | 0.9 (0.04) | 205.9 (8.12) |
| Average precipitation days (≥ 0.1 mm) | 2.9 | 2.3 | 2.9 | 3.3 | 7.3 | 11.1 | 11.6 | 9.5 | 6.6 | 2.5 | 1.5 | 1.3 | 62.8 |
| Average snowy days | 4.0 | 3.2 | 4.3 | 3.8 | 2.0 | 0.2 | 0.1 | 0.1 | 0.1 | 1.8 | 2.2 | 2.2 | 24 |
| Average relative humidity (%) | 43 | 35 | 31 | 33 | 40 | 51 | 56 | 54 | 51 | 40 | 40 | 41 | 43 |
| Mean monthly sunshine hours | 223.7 | 215.4 | 244.8 | 267.9 | 276.6 | 251.7 | 263.0 | 260.0 | 240.4 | 257.8 | 237.3 | 227.5 | 2,966.1 |
| Percentage possible sunshine | 72 | 70 | 65 | 67 | 63 | 57 | 59 | 63 | 66 | 75 | 79 | 76 | 68 |
Source: China Meteorological Administration

Climate data for Chaka, Ulan County, elevation 3,088 m (10,131 ft), (1991–2020 normals)
| Month | Jan | Feb | Mar | Apr | May | Jun | Jul | Aug | Sep | Oct | Nov | Dec | Year |
|---|---|---|---|---|---|---|---|---|---|---|---|---|---|
| Mean daily maximum °C (°F) | −2.2 (28.0) | 1.7 (35.1) | 6.8 (44.2) | 12.7 (54.9) | 16.6 (61.9) | 19.2 (66.6) | 21.5 (70.7) | 21.3 (70.3) | 17.2 (63.0) | 10.9 (51.6) | 4.1 (39.4) | −1.0 (30.2) | 10.7 (51.3) |
| Daily mean °C (°F) | −10.9 (12.4) | −7.1 (19.2) | −1.8 (28.8) | 4.5 (40.1) | 9.2 (48.6) | 12.5 (54.5) | 14.9 (58.8) | 14.3 (57.7) | 9.9 (49.8) | 2.6 (36.7) | −5.0 (23.0) | −9.8 (14.4) | 2.8 (37.0) |
| Mean daily minimum °C (°F) | −18.2 (−0.8) | −14.7 (5.5) | −9.2 (15.4) | −3.3 (26.1) | 2.1 (35.8) | 6.4 (43.5) | 9.0 (48.2) | 8.4 (47.1) | 4.1 (39.4) | −4.1 (24.6) | −12.1 (10.2) | −16.9 (1.6) | −4.0 (24.7) |
| Average precipitation mm (inches) | 1.2 (0.05) | 1.8 (0.07) | 3.3 (0.13) | 7.5 (0.30) | 26.3 (1.04) | 51.3 (2.02) | 58.8 (2.31) | 48.2 (1.90) | 27.2 (1.07) | 4.9 (0.19) | 1.4 (0.06) | 0.5 (0.02) | 232.4 (9.16) |
| Average precipitation days (≥ 0.1 mm) | 1.9 | 2.0 | 2.7 | 3.6 | 8.4 | 12.2 | 13.6 | 11.0 | 7.8 | 2.6 | 0.9 | 0.7 | 67.4 |
| Average snowy days | 2.8 | 2.9 | 4.3 | 4.0 | 2.4 | 0.2 | 0 | 0 | 0 | 1.8 | 1.7 | 1.2 | 21.3 |
| Average relative humidity (%) | 36 | 33 | 31 | 33 | 44 | 55 | 59 | 58 | 56 | 43 | 35 | 35 | 43 |
| Mean monthly sunshine hours | 231.2 | 221.4 | 255.2 | 269.9 | 267.5 | 233.5 | 248.5 | 253.2 | 235.7 | 261.3 | 245.1 | 233.5 | 2,956 |
| Percentage possible sunshine | 75 | 72 | 68 | 68 | 61 | 53 | 56 | 61 | 64 | 76 | 81 | 78 | 68 |
Source: China Meteorological Administration

== Transportation ==
The county is served by the Qinghai-Tibet Railway, which has a station at the county seat. There is also a freight-only branch to the salt works on the Chaka Salt Lake near Chaka Town, in the southeastern part of the county.
