= Soltaniyeh Rural District =

Rural district in Zanjan province, Iran

Soltaniyeh Rural District Persian: دهستان سلطانیه
- Rural District
- Location within Iran
- Coordinates: 36°26′N 48°44′E
- Country: Iran
- Province: Zanjan
- County: Soltaniyeh
- District: Central
- Established: 1987

Population (2016)
  - Total: 2,031
- Time zone: UTC+3:30 (IRST)

Soltaniyeh Rural District (Persian: دهستان سلطانیه) is in the Central District of Soltaniyeh County, Zanjan province, Iran. Its capital was the village of Qarah Bolagh until it became the capital of Qarah Bolagh Rural District in 2013.

== Demographics ==
=== Population ===
At the time of the 2006 National Census, the rural district's population (as a part of the former Soltaniyeh District in Abhar County) was 9,374 in 2,259 households. There were 8,656 inhabitants in 2,550 households at the following census of 2011. The 2016 census measured the population of the rural district as 2,031 in 624 households, by which time the district had been separated from the county in the establishment of Soltaniyeh County. The rural district was transferred to the new Central District. The most populous of its 17 villages was Moshkabad, with 488 people.

=== Other villages in the rural district ===
- Abbasabad
- Almaki
- Arjin
- Chap Darreh
- Kabud Gonbad
- Mihman-e Shahr Soltaniyeh
- Nadirabad
- Owlang
- Qaleh
- Tahmasababad
