= Bagh Helli District =

District in Zanjan province, Iran

Bagh Helli District Persian: بخش باغ حلی
- District
- Location within Iran
- Coordinates: 36°32′N 48°48′E
- Country: Iran
- Province: Zanjan
- County: Soltaniyeh
- Established: 2013
- Capital: Guzal Darreh

Population (2016)
  - Total: 11,493
- Time zone: UTC+3:30 (IRST)

Bagh Helli District (Persian: ببخش باغ حلی) is in Soltaniyeh County, Zanjan province, Iran. Its capital is the city of Guzal Darreh.

== History ==
In 2013, Soltaniyeh District was separated from Abhar County in the establishment of Soltaniyeh County, which was divided into two districts of two rural districts each, with Soltaniyeh as its capital and only city at the time. The village of Guzal Darreh was converted to a city in 2024.

== Demographics ==
=== Population ===
At the time of the 2016 National Census, the district's population was 11,493 people in 3,605 households.

=== Administrative divisions ===
Bagh Helli District Population
Administrative Divisions	2016
Guzal Darreh RD	4,794
Qarah Bolagh RD	6,699
Guzal Darreh (city) (Note: Became a city after the 2016 census)	
Total	11,493
RD = Rural District
