= Central District (Soltaniyeh County) =

District in Zanjan province, Iran

Central District (Soltaniyeh County) Persian: بخش مرکزی شهرستان سلطانیه
- District
- Location within Iran
- Coordinates: 36°24′N 48°51′E
- Country: Iran
- Province: Zanjan
- County: Soltaniyeh
- Established: 2013
- Capital: Soltaniyeh

Population (2016)
  - Total: 17,987
- Time zone: UTC+3:30 (IRST)

The Central District of Soltaniyeh County (Persian: بخش مرکزی شهرستان سلطانیه) is in Zanjan province, Iran. Its capital is the city of Soltaniyeh.

== History ==
In 2013, Soltaniyeh District was separated from Abhar County in the establishment of Soltaniyeh County, which was divided into two districts of two rural districts each, with Soltaniyeh as its capital and only city at the time.

== Demographics ==
=== Population ===
At the time of the 2016 National Census, the district's population was 17,987 inhabitants in 5,525 households.

=== Administrative divisions ===
Central District (Soltaniyeh County) Population
Administrative Divisions	2016
Soltaniyeh RD	2,031
Sonbolabad RD	8,318
Soltaniyeh (city)	7,638
Total	17,987
RD = Rural District
