= Soltaniyeh County =

County in Zanjan province, Iran

Soltaniyeh County Persian: شهرستان سلطانیه
- County
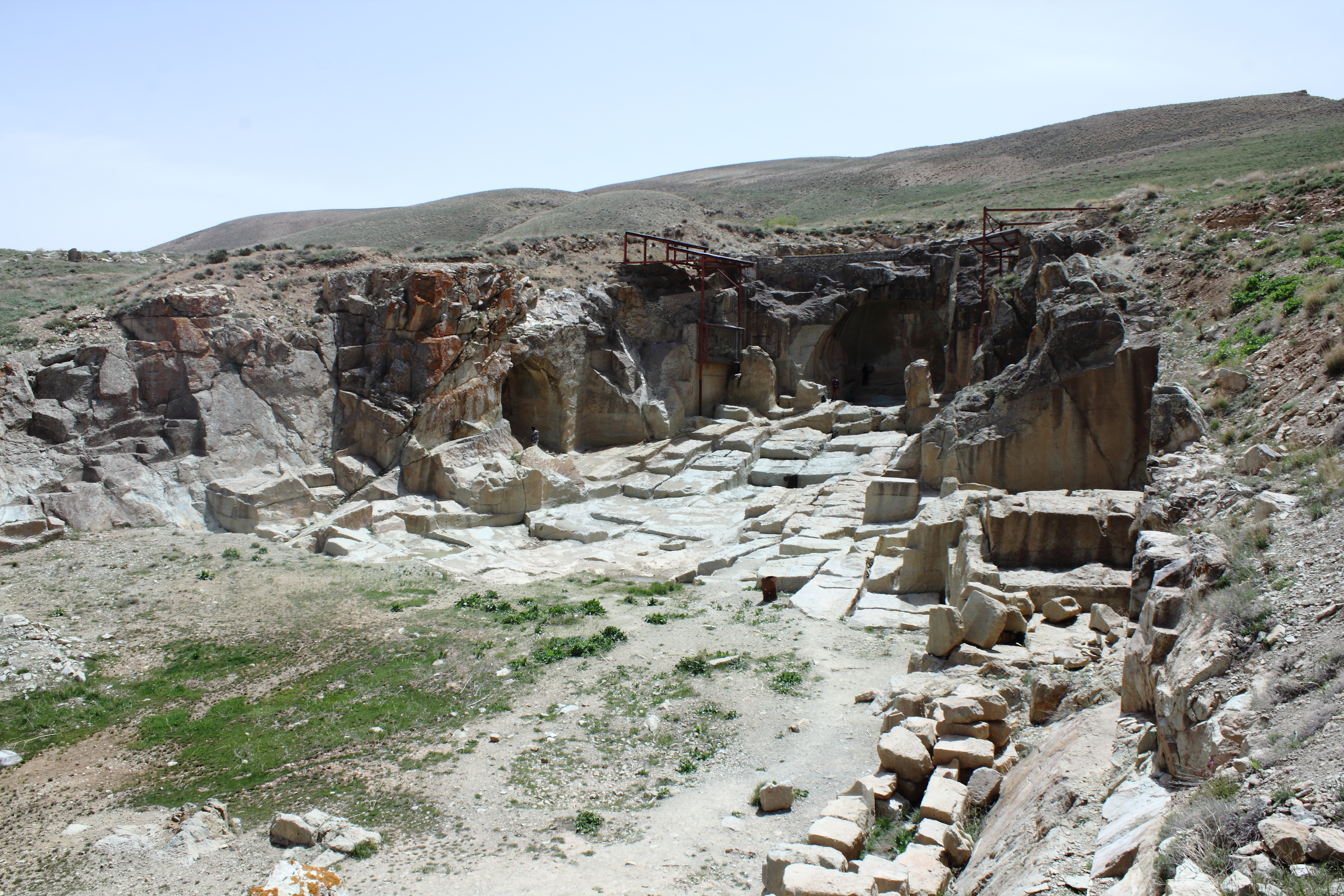
- Dashkasan Temple complex

- Location of Soltaniyeh County in Zanjan province (right, yellow)

- Location of Zanjan province in Iran
- Coordinates: 36°28′N 48°49′E
- Country: Iran
- Province: Zanjan
- Established: 2013
- Capital: Soltaniyeh
- Districts: Central, Bagh Helli

Area
  - Total: 1,358.8 km^{2} (524.6 sq mi)

Population (2016)
  - Total: 29,480
  - Density: 21.70/km^{2} (56.19/sq mi)
- Time zone: UTC+3:30 (IRST)

Soltaniyeh County (Persian: شهرستان سلطانیه) is in Zanjan province, Iran. Its capital is the city of Soltaniyeh.

== History ==
In 2013, Soltaniyeh District was separated from Abhar County in the establishment of Soltaniyeh County, which was divided into two districts of two rural districts each, with Soltaniyeh as its capital and only city at the time. The village of Guzal Darreh was converted to a city in 2024.

== Demographics ==
=== Population ===
The 2016 National Census measured the population as 29,480 in 9,130 households.

=== Administrative divisions ===
Soltaniyeh County's population and administrative structure are shown in the following table.

Soltaniyeh County Population
Administrative Divisions	2016
Central District	17,987
Soltaniyeh RD	2,031
Sonbolabad RD	8,318
Soltaniyeh (city)	7,638
Bagh Helli District	11,493
Guzal Darreh RD	4,794
Qarah Bolagh RD	6,699
Guzal Darreh (city) (Note: Became a city after the 2016 census)	
Total	29,480
RD = Rural District

== See also ==
Media related to Soltaniyeh County at Wikimedia Commons
