= Soltaniyeh District =

Former district in Zanjan province, Iran

Soltaniyeh District Persian: بخش سلطانیه
- Former District
- Location within Iran
- Coordinates: 36°28′N 48°49′E
- Country: Iran
- Province: Zanjan
- County: Abhar
- Capital: Soltaniyeh

Population (2011)
  - Total: 28,592
- Time zone: UTC+3:30 (IRST)

Soltaniyeh District (Persian: بخش سلطانیه) is a former administrative division of Abhar County, Zanjan province, Iran. Its capital was the city of Soltaniyeh.

== History ==
In 2013, the district was separated from the county in the establishment of Soltaniyeh County.

== Demographics ==
=== Population ===
At the time of the 2006 National Census, the district's population was 28,266 in 7,282 households. The following census in 2011 counted 28,592 people in 8,395 households.

=== Administrative divisions ===
Soltaniyeh District Population
Administrative Divisions	2006	2011
Guzal Darreh RD	4,959	4,864
Soltaniyeh RD	9,374	8,656
Sonbolabad RD	8,069	7,956
Soltaniyeh (city)	5,864	7,116
Total	28,266	28,592
RD = Rural District
