= List of municipalities in Elazığ Province =

This is the list of municipalities in Elazığ Province, Turkey as of December 2022.

District	Municipality
Ağın	Ağın
Alacakaya	Alacakaya
Arıcak	Arıcak
Arıcak	Bükardı
Arıcak	Erimli
Arıcak	Üçocak
Baskil	Baskil
Elazığ	Akçakiraz
Elazığ	Elazığ
Elazığ	Mollakendi
Elazığ	Yazıkonak
Elazığ	Yurtbaşı
Karakoçan	Karakoçan
Karakoçan	Sarıcan
Keban	Keban
Kovancılar	Kovancılar
Maden	Maden
Palu	Beyhan
Palu	Palu
Sivrice	Sivrice
