= Akçakale (disambiguation) =

Akçakale can refer to:

- Akçakale
- Akçakale, Çıldır
- Akçakale, Ergani
- Akçakale, Elâzığ
- Akcakale, Trabzon
- Akçakale tower
