= Sarılı, Elazığ =

Village in Turkey

Sarılı
- Village
- Location within Turkey
- Coordinates: 38.544°N 39.103°E
- Country: Turkey
- Province: Elazığ
- District: Elazığ
- Population (2021): 153
- Time zone: UTC+3 (TRT)

Sarılı is a village in the Elazığ District of Elazığ Province in Turkey. Its population is 153 (2021).
