= Hal, Elazığ =

Village in Turkey

Hal
- Village
- Location within Turkey
- Coordinates: 38°46′15″N 38°55′10″E
- Country: Turkey
- Province: Elazığ
- District: Elazığ
- Population (2021): 232
- Time zone: UTC+3 (TRT)

Hal is a village in the Elazığ District of Elazığ Province in Turkey. Its population is 232 (2021).
