= Aşağıdemirtaş, Elazığ =

Village in Turkey

Aşağıdemirtaş
- Village
- Location within Turkey
- Coordinates: 38°36′02″N 39°06′45″E
- Country: Turkey
- Province: Elazığ
- District: Elazığ
- Population (2021): 300
- Time zone: UTC+3 (TRT)

Aşağıdemirtaş is a village in the Elazığ District of Elazığ Province in Turkey. Its population is 300 (2021). The village is populated by Kurds of the Herdî tribe.
