= Beydalı, Elazığ =

Village in Turkey

Beydalı
- Village
- Location within Turkey
- Coordinates: 38°47′N 39°22′E
- Country: Turkey
- Province: Elazığ
- District: Elazığ
- Population (2021): 117
- Time zone: UTC+3 (TRT)

Beydalı is a village in the Elazığ District of Elazığ Province in Turkey. Its population is 117 (2021).
