= Kıraçköy, Elazığ =

Village in Turkey

Kıraçköy
- Village
- Location within Turkey
- Coordinates: 38.690°N 39.443°E
- Country: Turkey
- Province: Elazığ
- District: Elazığ
- Population (2021): 384
- Time zone: UTC+3 (TRT)

Kıraçköy is a village in the Elazığ District of Elazığ Province in Turkey. Its population is 384 (2021).
