= Yolüstü, Elazığ =

Village in Turkey

Yolüstü
- Village
- Location within Turkey
- Coordinates: 38.645°N 39.695°E
- Country: Turkey
- Province: Elazığ
- District: Elazığ
- Population (2021): 158
- Time zone: UTC+3 (TRT)

Yolüstü is a village in the Elazığ District of Elazığ Province in Turkey. Its population is 158 (2021).
