= Gölköy, Elazığ =

Village in Turkey

Gölköy
- Village
- Location within Turkey
- Coordinates: 38°33′11″N 39°4′18″E
- Country: Turkey
- Province: Elazığ
- District: Elazığ
- Population (2021): 302
- Time zone: UTC+3 (TRT)

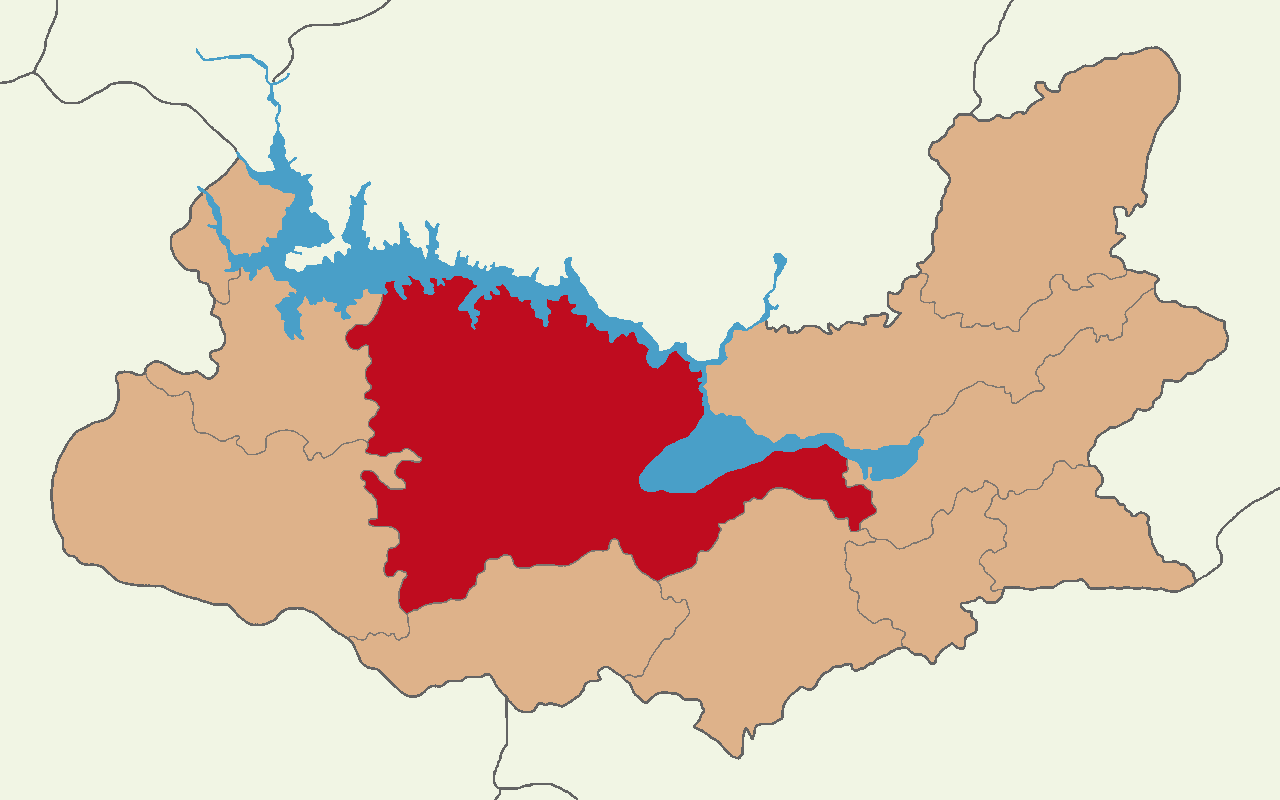
Merkel.png

Gölköy is a village in the Elazığ District of Elazığ Province in Turkey. Its population is 302 (2021).
