= Elmapınarı, Elazığ =

Village in Turkey

Elmapınarı
- Village
- Location within Turkey
- Coordinates: 38°35′34″N 39°28′10″E
- Country: Turkey
- Province: Elazığ
- District: Elazığ
- Population (2021): 194
- Time zone: UTC+3 (TRT)

Elmapınarı is a village in the Elazığ District of Elazığ Province in Turkey. Its population is 194 (2021).
