= Serince, Elazığ =

Village in Turkey

Serince
- Village
- Location within Turkey
- Coordinates: 38.760°N 39.301°E
- Country: Turkey
- Province: Elazığ
- District: Elazığ
- Population (2021): 126
- Time zone: UTC+3 (TRT)

Serince is a village in the Elazığ District of Elazığ Province in Turkey. Its population is 126 (2021).
