= Pelteköy, Elazığ =

Village in Turkey

Pelteköy
- Village
- Location within Turkey
- Coordinates: 38°42′N 39°03′E
- Country: Turkey
- Province: Elazığ
- District: Elazığ
- Population (2021): 248
- Time zone: UTC+3 (TRT)

Pelteköy is a village in the Elazığ District of Elazığ Province in Turkey. Its population is 248 (2021). The village is populated by Kurds.
