= Obuz, Elazığ =

Village in Turkey

Obuz
- Village
- Location within Turkey
- Coordinates: 38°44′27″N 39°13′12″E
- Country: Turkey
- Province: Elazığ
- District: Elazığ
- Population (2021): 90
- Time zone: UTC+3 (TRT)

Obuz is a village in the Elazığ District of Elazığ Province in Turkey. Its population is 90 (2021).
