= Kumla, Elazığ =

Village in Turkey

Kumla
- Village
- Location within Turkey
- Coordinates: 38.592°N 39.676°E
- Country: Turkey
- Province: Elazığ
- District: Elazığ
- Population (2021): 167
- Time zone: UTC+3 (TRT)

Kumla is a village in the Elazığ District of Elazığ Province in Turkey. Its population is 167 (2021). The village is populated by Turks.
