= Konakalmaz, Elazığ =

Village in Turkey

Konakalmaz
- Village
- Location within Turkey
- Coordinates: 38°38′N 39°39′E
- Country: Turkey
- Province: Elazığ
- District: Elazığ
- Population (2021): 177
- Time zone: UTC+3 (TRT)

Konakalmaz is a village in the Elazığ District of Elazığ Province in Turkey. Its population is 177 (2021). The village is populated by Turks.
