= Kavaktepe, Elazığ =

Village in Turkey

Kavaktepe
- Village
- Location within Turkey
- Coordinates: 38.512°N 39.202°E
- Country: Turkey
- Province: Elazığ
- District: Elazığ
- Population (2021): 406
- Time zone: UTC+3 (TRT)

Kavaktepe is a village in the Elazığ District of Elazığ Province in Turkey. Its population is 406 (2021).
