= Hankendi =

Hankendi may refer to:

- Khankendi, a city in Azerbaijan
- Hankendi, Elazığ, a town in the district of Elazığ, Elazığ Province, Turkey
