= Yünlüce, Elazığ =

Village in Turkey

Yünlüce
- Village
- Location within Turkey
- Coordinates: 38.603°N 39.345°E
- Country: Turkey
- Province: Elazığ
- District: Elazığ
- Population (2021): 337
- Time zone: UTC+3 (TRT)

Yünlüce is a village in the Elazığ District of Elazığ Province in Turkey. Its population is 337 (2021).
