= Dallıca, Elazığ =

Village in Turkey

Dallıca
- Village
- Location within Turkey
- Coordinates: 38°48′59″N 38°55′53″E
- Country: Turkey
- Province: Elazığ
- District: Elazığ
- Population (2021): 140
- Time zone: UTC+3 (TRT)

Dallıca is a village in the Elazığ District of Elazığ Province in Turkey. Its population is 140 (2021).
