= Yukarıçakmak, Elazığ =

Village in Turkey

Yukarıçakmak
- Village
- Location within Turkey
- Coordinates: 38.710°N 38.942°E
- Country: Turkey
- Province: Elazığ
- District: Elazığ
- Population (2021): 78
- Time zone: UTC+3 (TRT)

Yukarıçakmak is a village in the Elazığ District of Elazığ Province in Turkey. Its population is 78 (2021).
