= Doğankuş, Elazığ =

Village in Turkey

Doğankuş
- Village
- Location within Turkey
- Coordinates: 38°35′N 39°18′E
- Country: Turkey
- Province: Elazığ
- District: Elazığ
- Population (2021): 317
- Time zone: UTC+3 (TRT)

Doğankuş is a village in the Elazığ District of Elazığ Province in Turkey. Its population is 317 (2021).
