= Balpınar, Elazığ =

Village in Turkey

Balpınar
- Village
- Location within Turkey
- Coordinates: 38.6810°N 38.9342°E
- Country: Turkey
- Province: Elazığ
- District: Elazığ
- Population (2021): 51
- Time zone: UTC+3 (TRT)

Balpınar is a village in the Elazığ District of Elazığ Province in Turkey. Its population was 51 as of 2021.
