= Gökçe, Elazığ =

Village in Turkey

Gökçe
- Village
- Location within Turkey
- Coordinates: 38°30′23″N 39°5′40″E
- Country: Turkey
- Province: Elazığ
- District: Elazığ
- Population (2021): 133
- Time zone: UTC+3 (TRT)

Gökçe is a village in the Elazığ District of Elazığ Province in Turkey. Its population is 133 (2021).
