= Güzelyalı, Elazığ =

Village in Turkey

Güzelyalı
- Village
- Location within Turkey
- Coordinates: 38°41′28″N 39°28′9″E
- Country: Turkey
- Province: Elazığ
- District: Elazığ
- Population (2021): 159
- Time zone: UTC+3 (TRT)

Güzelyalı is a village in the Elazığ District of Elazığ Province in Turkey. Its population is 159 (2021).
