= Beşoluk, Elazığ =

Village in Turkey

Beşoluk
- Village
- Location within Turkey
- Coordinates: 38.7682°N 39.3521°E
- Country: Turkey
- Province: Elazığ
- District: Elazığ
- Population (2021): 46
- Time zone: UTC+3 (TRT)

Beşoluk is a village in the Elazığ District of Elazığ Province in Turkey. Its population is 46 (2021).
