= Poyraz, Elazığ =

Village in Turkey

Poyraz
- Village
- Location within Turkey
- Coordinates: 38.690°N 39.024°E
- Country: Turkey
- Province: Elazığ
- District: Elazığ
- Population (2021): 165
- Time zone: UTC+3 (TRT)

Poyraz is a village in the Elazığ District of Elazığ Province in Turkey. Its population is 165 (2021).
