= Ürünveren, Elazığ =

Village in Turkey

Ürünveren
- Village
- Location within Turkey
- Coordinates: 38.539°N 39.161°E
- Country: Turkey
- Province: Elazığ
- District: Elazığ
- Population (2021): 76
- Time zone: UTC+3 (TRT)

Ürünveren is a village in the Elazığ District of Elazığ Province in Turkey. The village is populated by Kurds and had a population of 76 in 2021.
