= Sarıkamış, Elazığ =

Village in Turkey

Sarıkamış
- Village
- Location within Turkey
- Coordinates: 38.596°N 39.680°E
- Country: Turkey
- Province: Elazığ
- District: Elazığ
- Population (2021): 429
- Time zone: UTC+3 (TRT)

Sarıkamış is a village in the Elazığ District of Elazığ Province in Turkey. Its population is 429 (2021).
