= Esenkent, Elazığ =

Village in Turkey

Esenkent
- Village
- Location within Turkey
- Coordinates: 38°49′48″N 39°3′24″E
- Country: Turkey
- Province: Elazığ
- District: Elazığ
- Population (2021): 91
- Time zone: UTC+3 (TRT)

Esenkent is a village in the Elazığ District of Elazığ Province in Turkey. Its population is 91 (2021).
