= Karataş, Elazığ =

Village in Turkey

Karataş
- Village
- Location within Turkey
- Coordinates: 38.745°N 39.324°E
- Country: Turkey
- Province: Elazığ
- District: Elazığ
- Population (2021): 39
- Time zone: UTC+3 (TRT)

Karataş is a village in the Elazığ District of Elazığ Province in Turkey. Its population is 39 (2021).
