= Harmantepe, Elazığ =

Village in Turkey

Harmantepe
- Village
- Location within Turkey
- Coordinates: 38.669°N 39.068°E
- Country: Turkey
- Province: Elazığ
- District: Elazığ
- Population (2021): 135
- Time zone: UTC+3 (TRT)

Harmantepe is a village in the Elazığ District of Elazığ Province in Turkey. Its population is 135 (2021).
