= Aydınlar, Elazığ =

Village in Turkey

Aydınlar
- Village
- Location within Turkey
- Coordinates: 38.8007°N 38.8941°E
- Country: Turkey
- Province: Elazığ
- District: Elazığ
- Population (2021): 64
- Time zone: UTC+3 (TRT)

Aydınlar is a village in the Elazığ District of Elazığ Province in Turkey. Its population is 64 (2021).
