= Beşikköy, Elazığ =

Village in Turkey

Beşikköy
- Village
- Location within Turkey
- Coordinates: 38°40′N 39°02′E
- Country: Turkey
- Province: Elazığ
- District: Elazığ
- Population (2021): 100
- Time zone: UTC+3 (TRT)

Beşikköy is a village in the Elazığ District of Elazığ Province in Turkey. Its population is 100 (2021).
