= Gedikyolu, Elazığ =

Village in Turkey

Gedikyolu
- Village
- Location within Turkey
- Coordinates: 38°38′N 39°40′E
- Country: Turkey
- Province: Elazığ
- District: Elazığ
- Population (2021): 140
- Time zone: UTC+3 (TRT)

Gedikyolu is a village in the Elazığ District of Elazığ Province in Turkey. Its population is 140 (2021). The village is populated by Turks.
