= Çöteli, Elazığ =

Village in Turkey

Çöteli
- Village
- Location within Turkey
- Coordinates: 38.7451°N 39.0151°E
- Country: Turkey
- Province: Elazığ
- District: Elazığ
- Population (2021): 198
- Time zone: UTC+3 (TRT)

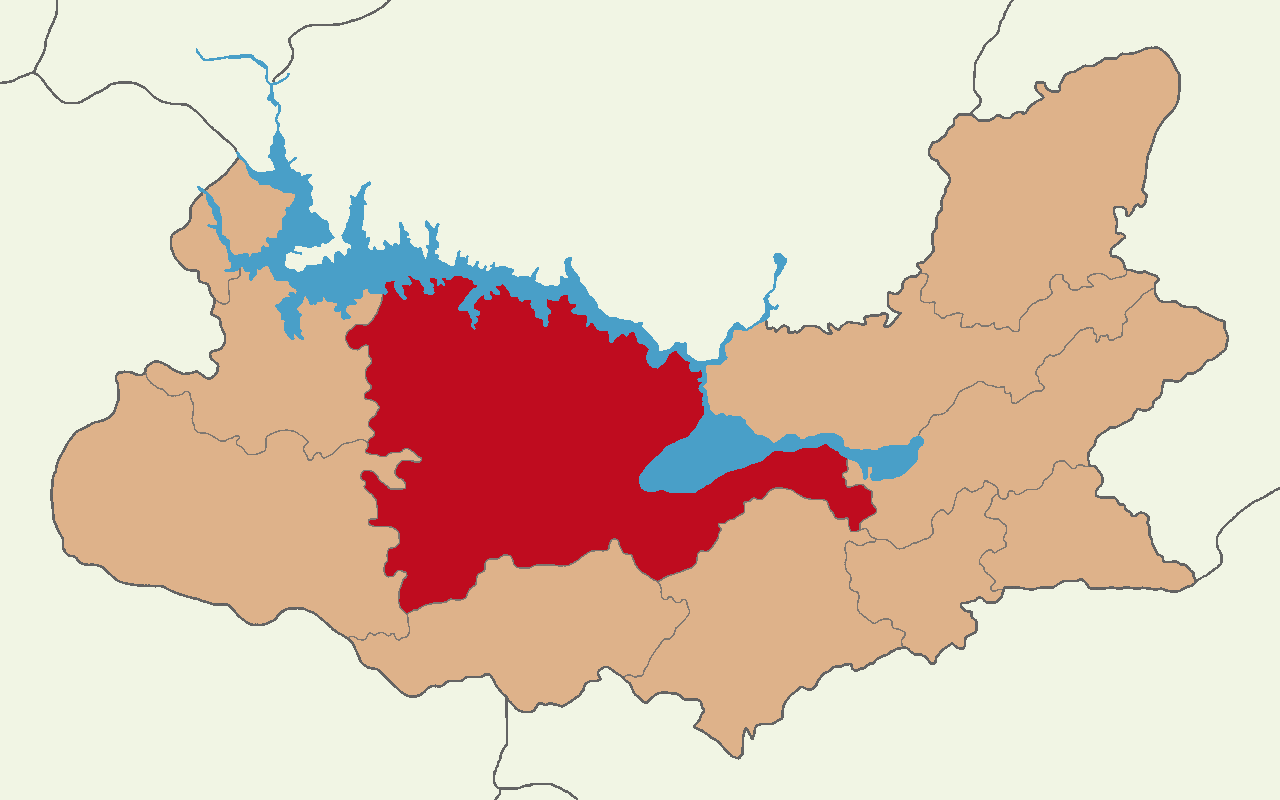
The location of Elazığ District in Elazığ Province where Çöteli village is located

Çöteli is a village in the Elazığ District of Elazığ Province in Turkey. Its population is 198 (2021).
