= Yenikapı, Elazığ =

Village in Turkey

Yenikapı
- Village
- Location within Turkey
- Coordinates: 38.592°N 39.406°E
- Country: Turkey
- Province: Elazığ
- District: Elazığ
- Population (2021): 171
- Time zone: UTC+3 (TRT)

Yenikapı is a village in the Elazığ District of Elazığ Province in Turkey. Its population is 171 (2021).
