= Sedeftepe, Elazığ =

Village in Turkey

Sedeftepe
- Village
- Location within Turkey
- Coordinates: 38°41′N 39°22′E
- Country: Turkey
- Province: Elazığ
- District: Elazığ
- Population (2021): 293
- Time zone: UTC+3 (TRT)

Sedeftepe is a village in the Elazığ District of Elazığ Province in Turkey. Its population is 293 (2021). The village is populated by Kurds.
