= Yalnız =

Yalnız can refer to:

- Yalnız, Elâzığ
- Yalnız, Merzifon
