= Temürköy, Elazığ =

Village in Turkey

Temürköy
- Village
- Location within Turkey
- Coordinates: 38°30′N 39°03′E
- Country: Turkey
- Province: Elazığ
- District: Elazığ
- Population (2021): 111
- Time zone: UTC+3 (TRT)

Temürköy is a village in the Elazığ District of Elazığ Province in Turkey. Its population is 111 (2021).
