= Yukarıdemirtaş, Elazığ =

Village in Turkey

Yukarıdemirtaş
- Village
- Location within Turkey
- Coordinates: 38°36′N 39°07′E
- Country: Turkey
- Province: Elazığ
- District: Elazığ
- Population (2021): 101
- Time zone: UTC+3 (TRT)

Yukarıdemirtaş is a village in the Elazığ District of Elazığ Province in Turkey. Its population is 101 (2021). The village is populated by Kurds of the Herdî tribe.
