= Kavakpınar, Elazığ =

Village in Turkey

Kavakpınar
- Village
- Location within Turkey
- Coordinates: 38.705°N 38.978°E
- Country: Turkey
- Province: Elazığ
- District: Elazığ
- Population (2021): 64
- Time zone: UTC+3 (TRT)

Kavakpınar is a village in the Elazığ District of Elazığ Province in Turkey. Its population is 64 (2021).
