= Pirinççi, Elazığ =

Village in Turkey

Pirinççi
- Village
- Location within Turkey
- Coordinates: 38.802°N 38.976°E
- Country: Turkey
- Province: Elazığ
- District: Elazığ
- Population (2021): 109
- Time zone: UTC+3 (TRT)

Pirinççi is a village in the Elazığ District of Elazığ Province in Turkey. Its population is 109 (2021).
