= Badempınarı, Elazığ =

Village in Elazığ Province, Turkey

Badempınarı
- Village
- Location within Turkey
- Coordinates: 38°31′N 39°07′E
- Country: Turkey
- Province: Elazığ
- District: Elazığ
- Population (2021): 60
- Time zone: UTC+3 (TRT)

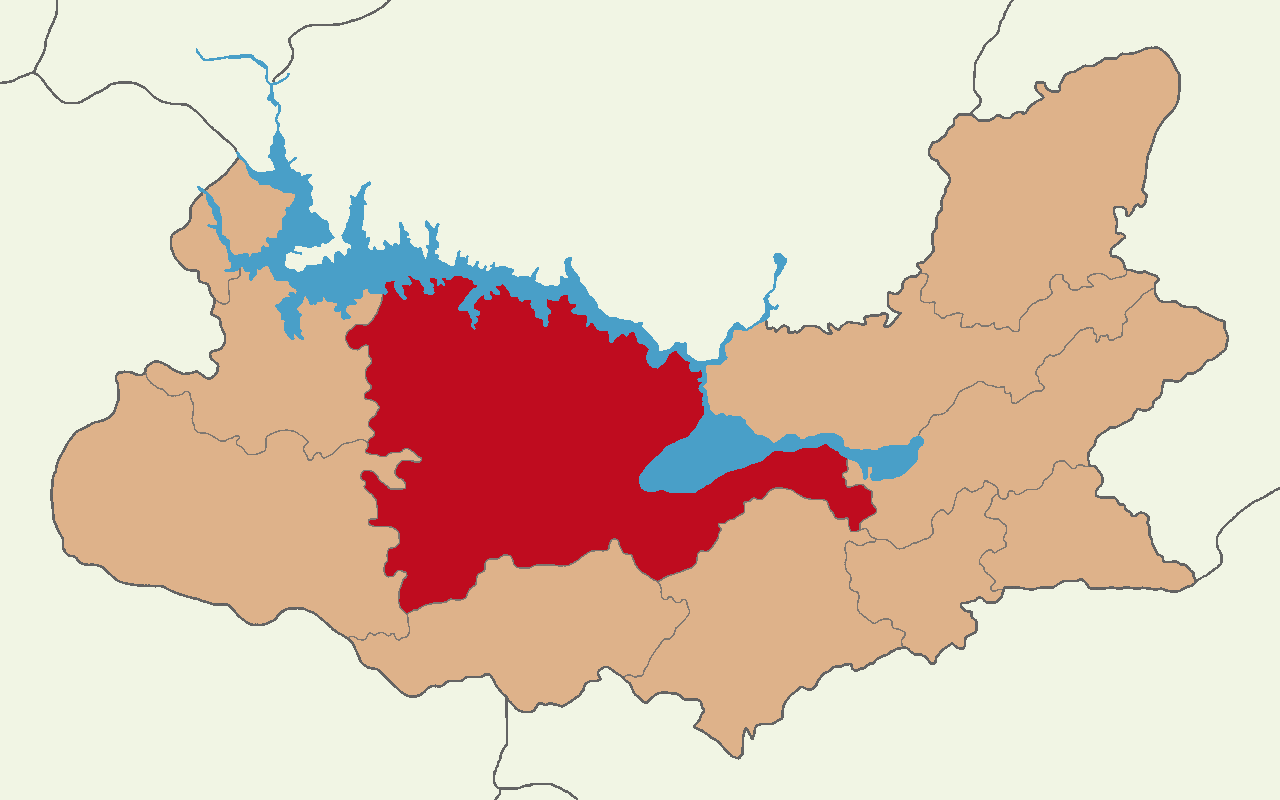
Map of the Elazığ district.

Badempınarı is a village in the Elazığ District of Elazığ Province in Turkey. Its population is 60 (2021).
