= Balıbey, Elazığ =

Village in Turkey

Balıbey
- Village
- Location within Turkey
- Coordinates: 38.7982°N 38.9399°E
- Country: Turkey
- Province: Elazığ
- District: Elazığ
- Population (2021): 57
- Time zone: UTC+3 (TRT)

Balıbey is a village in the Elazığ District of Elazığ Province in Turkey. Its population is 57 (2021).
