= Kaplıkaya, Elazığ =

Village in Turkey

Kaplıkaya
- Village
- Location within Turkey
- Coordinates: 38.782°N 39.174°E
- Country: Turkey
- Province: Elazığ
- District: Elazığ
- Population (2021): 169
- Time zone: UTC+3 (TRT)

Kaplıkaya is a village in the Elazığ District of Elazığ Province in Turkey. Its population is 169 (2021).
