= Kalkantepe, Elazığ =

Village in Turkey

Kalkantepe
- Village
- Location within Turkey
- Coordinates: 38°42′N 38°57′E
- Country: Turkey
- Province: Elazığ
- District: Elazığ
- Population (2021): 60
- Time zone: UTC+3 (TRT)

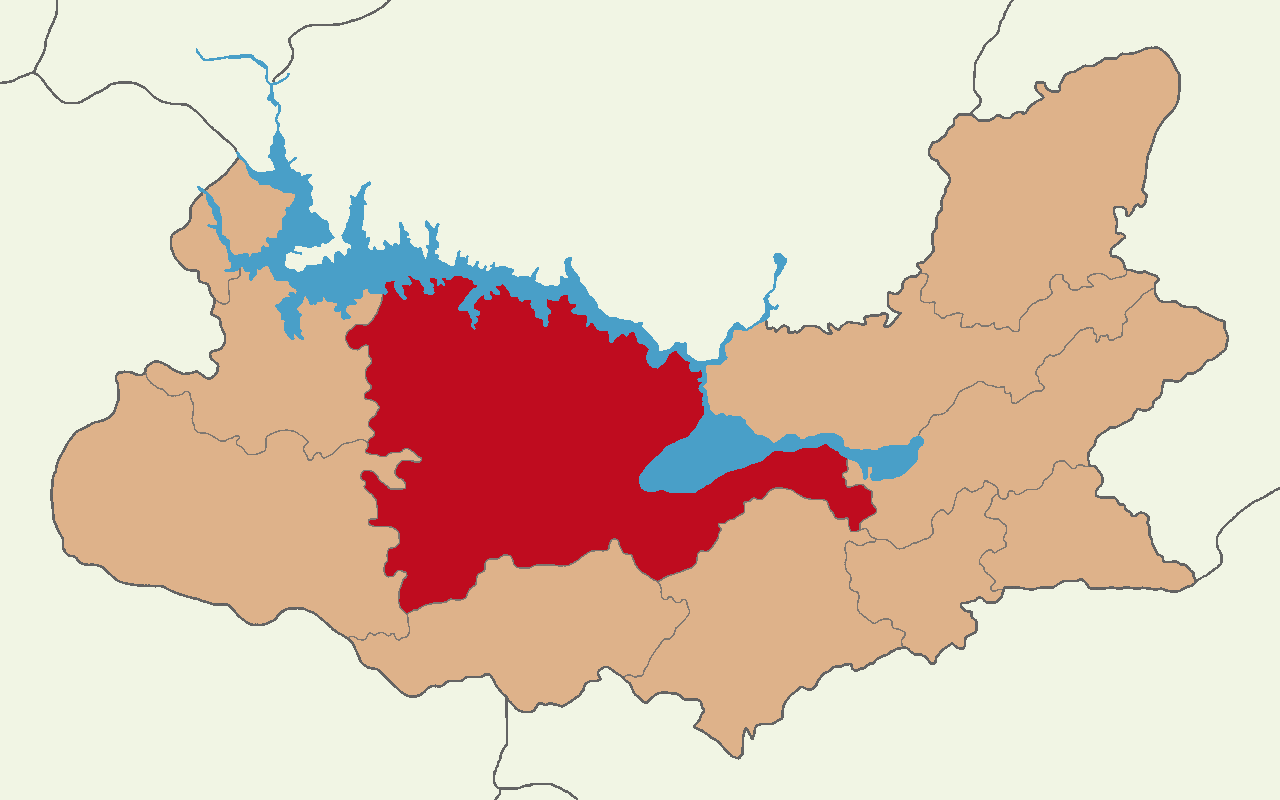
Location of Elazığ Central District.

Kalkantepe is a village in the Elazığ District of Elazığ Province in Turkey. Its population was 60 as of 2021.
