= Körpe, Elazığ =

Village in Turkey

Körpe
- Village
- Location within Turkey
- Coordinates: 38.754°N 39.131°E
- Country: Turkey
- Province: Elazığ
- District: Elazığ
- Population (2021): 205
- Time zone: UTC+3 (TRT)

Körpe is a village in the Elazığ District of Elazığ Province in Turkey. Its population is 205 (2021).
