= Günaçtı, Elazığ =

Village in Turkey

Günaçtı
- Village
- Location within Turkey
- Coordinates: 38°29′23″N 39°0′34″E
- Country: Turkey
- Province: Elazığ
- District: Elazığ
- Population (2021): 121
- Time zone: UTC+3 (TRT)

Günaçtı is a village in the Elazığ District of Elazığ Province in Turkey. Its population is 121 (2021). The village is populated by Kurds of the Herdî tribe.
