= Aydıncık, Elazığ =

Village in Turkey

Aydıncık
- Village
- Location within Turkey
- Coordinates: 38.8316°N 39.1823°E
- Country: Turkey
- Province: Elazığ
- District: Elazığ
- Population (2021): 352
- Time zone: UTC+3 (TRT)

Aydıncık is a village in the Elazığ District of Elazığ Province in Turkey. Its population is 352 (2021). The village is populated by Kurds of the Bahtiyar, Bermaz, Lolan, Pilvenk and Şêx Mehmedan tribes.
