= Güneyçayırı, Elazığ =

Village in Turkey

Güneyçayırı
- Village
- Location within Turkey
- Coordinates: 38°42′N 39°19′E
- Country: Turkey
- Province: Elazığ
- District: Elazığ
- Population (2021): 3,757
- Time zone: UTC+3 (TRT)

Güneyçayırı is a village in the Elazığ District of Elazığ Province in Turkey. Its population is 3,757 (2021).
