= Gölardı, Elazığ =

Village in Turkey

Gölardı
- Village
- Location within Turkey
- Coordinates: 38°32′44″N 39°26′35″E
- Country: Turkey
- Province: Elazığ
- District: Elazığ
- Population (2021): 174
- Time zone: UTC+3 (TRT)

Gölardı is a village in the Elazığ District of Elazığ Province in Turkey. Its population is 174 (2021).
