= Karasaz, Elazığ =

Village in Turkey

Karasaz
- Village
- Location within Turkey
- Coordinates: 38°34′15″N 39°25′07″E
- Country: Turkey
- Province: Elazığ
- District: Elazığ
- Population (2021): 215
- Time zone: UTC+3 (TRT)

Karasaz is a village in the Elazığ District of Elazığ Province in Turkey. Its population is 215 (2021).
