= Avcılı, Elazığ =

Village in Turkey

Avcılı
- Village
- Location within Turkey
- Coordinates: 38.7300°N 39.0584°E
- Country: Turkey
- Province: Elazığ
- District: Elazığ
- Population (2021): 124
- Time zone: UTC+3 (TRT)

Avcılı is a village in the Elazığ District of Elazığ Province in Turkey. Its population is 124 (2021).
