= Şabanlı, Elazığ =

Village in Turkey

Şabanlı
- Village
- Location within Turkey
- Coordinates: 38°37′13″N 38°59′22″E
- Country: Turkey
- Province: Elazığ
- District: Elazığ
- Population (2021): 50
- Time zone: UTC+3 (TRT)

Şabanlı is a village in the Elazığ District of Elazığ Province in Turkey. Its population is 50 (2021). The village is populated by Kurds of the Herdî tribe.
