= Çağlar, Elazığ =

Village in Turkey

Çağlar
- Village
- Location within Turkey
- Coordinates: 38.5837°N 39.3829°E
- Country: Turkey
- Province: Elazığ
- District: Elazığ
- Population (2021): 448
- Time zone: UTC+3 (TRT)

Çağlar is a village in the Elazığ District of Elazığ Province in Turkey. Its population is 448 (2021).
