= Cipköy, Elazığ =

Village in Turkey

Cipköy
- Village
- Location within Turkey
- Coordinates: 38°41′N 39°05′E
- Country: Turkey
- Province: Elazığ
- District: Elazığ
- Population (2021): 654
- Time zone: UTC+3 (TRT)

Cipköy is a village in the Elazığ District of Elazığ Province, Turkey. Its population is 654 (2021).
