= Dedepınarı, Elazığ =

Village in Turkey

Dedepınarı
- Village
- Location within Turkey
- Coordinates: 38°29′43″N 39°9′49″E
- Country: Turkey
- Province: Elazığ
- District: Elazığ
- Population (2021): 105
- Time zone: UTC+3 (TRT)

Dedepınarı is a village in the Elazığ District of Elazığ Province in Turkey. Its population is 105 (2021).
