= Kepektaş, Elazığ =

Village in Turkey

Kepektaş
- Village
- Location within Turkey
- Coordinates: 38°39′N 38°55′E
- Country: Turkey
- Province: Elazığ
- District: Elazığ
- Population (2021): 81
- Time zone: UTC+3 (TRT)

Kepektaş is a village in the Elazığ District of Elazığ Province in Turkey. Its population is 81 (2021).
