= Nuralı, Elazığ =

Village in Turkey

Nuralı
- Village
- Location within Turkey
- Coordinates: 38°43′N 39°10′E
- Country: Turkey
- Province: Elazığ
- District: Elazığ
- Population (2021): 205
- Time zone: UTC+3 (TRT)

Nuralı is a village in the Elazığ District of Elazığ Province in Turkey. Its population is 205 (2021).
