= Meşeli, Elazığ =

Village in Turkey

Meşeli
- Village
- Location within Turkey
- Coordinates: 38°49′33″N 39°14′44″E
- Country: Turkey
- Province: Elazığ
- District: Elazığ
- Population (2021): 299
- Time zone: UTC+3 (TRT)

Meşeli is a village in the Elazığ District of Elazığ Province in Turkey. Its population is 299 (2021). The village is populated by Kurds of the Şikakî tribe.
