= Bağlarca, Elazığ =

Village in Turkey

Bağlarca
- Village
- Location within Turkey
- Coordinates: 38.6452°N 39.0465°E
- Country: Turkey
- Province: Elazığ
- District: Elazığ
- Population (2021): 137
- Time zone: UTC+3 (TRT)

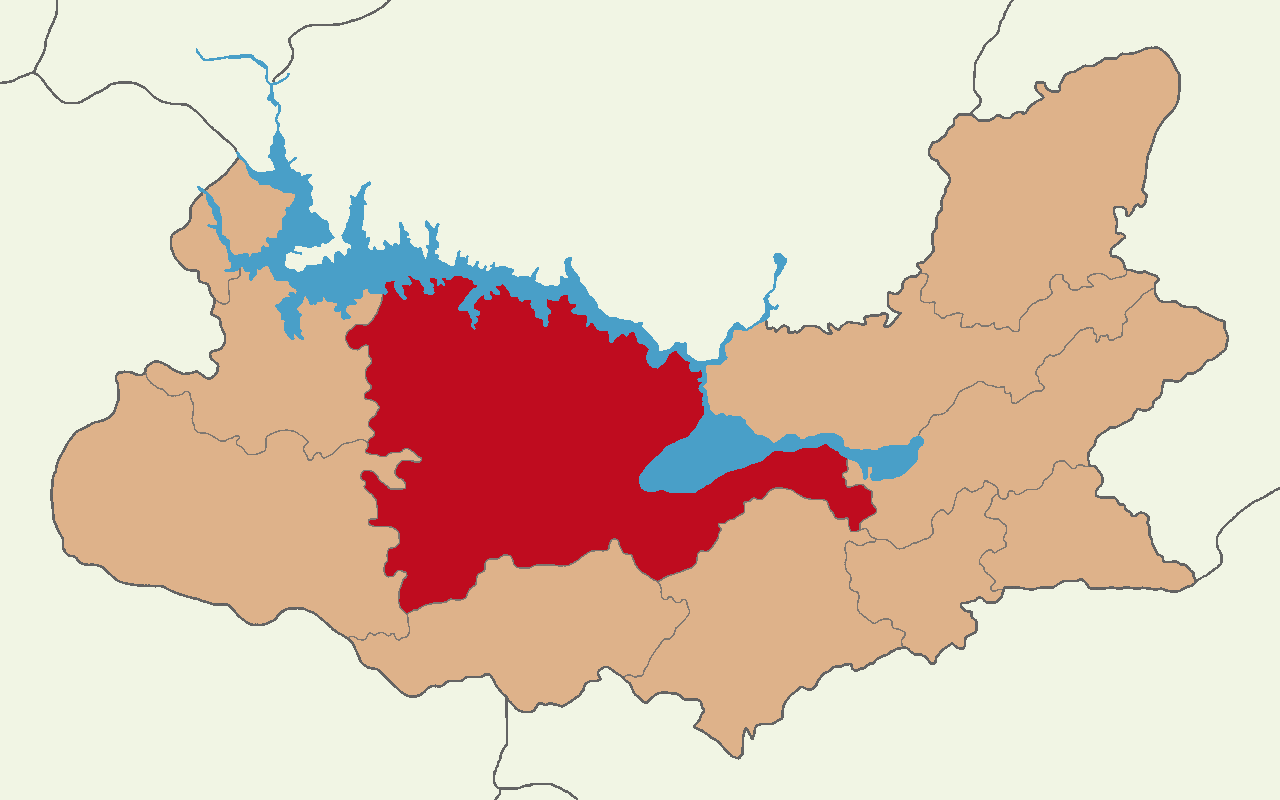
The location of Elazığ District in Elazığ Province, where Bağlarca village is located

Bağlarca is a village in the Elazığ District of Elazığ Province in Turkey. Its population is 137 (2021).
