= Yedigöze, Elazığ =

Village in Turkey

Yedigöze
- Village
- Location within Turkey
- Coordinates: 38.530°N 39.267°E
- Country: Turkey
- Province: Elazığ
- District: Elazığ
- Population (2021): 453
- Time zone: UTC+3 (TRT)

Yedigöze is a village in the Elazığ District of Elazığ Province in Turkey. Its population is 453 (2021).
