= Sancaklı =

Sancaklı may refer to:

- Sancaklı, Elâzığ
- Sancaklı, İzmir, village in Izmir Province, Turkey
- Saffet Sancaklı, Turkish footballer
