= Oymaağaç, Elazığ =

Village in Turkey

Oymaağaç
- Village
- Location within Turkey
- Coordinates: 38.724°N 39.341°E
- Country: Turkey
- Province: Elazığ
- District: Elazığ
- Population (2021): 87
- Time zone: UTC+3 (TRT)

Oymaağaç is a village in the Elazığ District of Elazığ Province in Turkey. Its population is 87 (2021).
