= Sarıçubuk, Elazığ =

Village in Turkey

Sarıçubuk
- Village
- Location within Turkey
- Coordinates: 38°40′N 39°08′E
- Country: Turkey
- Province: Elazığ
- District: Elazığ
- Population (2021): 568
- Time zone: UTC+3 (TRT)

Sarıçubuk or Pazmashen (Armenian: Բազմաշէն) is a village in the Elazığ District of Elazığ Province in Turkey. Its population is 568 (2021).
