= Bahçekapı, Elâzığ =

Village in Turkey

Bahçekapı
- Neighbourhood
- Location in Turkey
- Coordinates: 38.5655°N 39.2704°E
- Country: Turkey
- Province: Elazığ
- District: Elazığ
- Municipality: Akçakiraz
- Population (2021): 1,091
- Time zone: UTC+3 (TRT)

Bahçekapı is a neighbourhood of the town Akçakiraz in Elazığ Province in Turkey. Its population is 1,091 (2021).
