= Sütlüce, Elazığ =

Village in Turkey

Sütlüce
- Village
- Location within Turkey
- Coordinates: 38.595°N 38.979°E
- Country: Turkey
- Province: Elazığ
- District: Elazığ
- Population (2021): 223
- Time zone: UTC+3 (TRT)

Sütlüce is a village in the Elazığ District of Elazığ Province in Turkey. Its population is 223 (2021). The village is populated by Kurds of the Herdî tribe.
