= Hıdırbaba, Elazığ =

Village in Turkey

Hıdırbaba
- Village
- Location within Turkey
- Coordinates: 38°46′27″N 38°58′41″E
- Country: Turkey
- Province: Elazığ
- District: Elazığ
- Population (2021): 472
- Time zone: UTC+3 (TRT)

Hıdırbaba is a village in the Elazığ District of Elazığ Province in Turkey. Its population as of 2021 is 472.
