= Üçağaç, Elazığ =

Village in Turkey

Üçağaç
- Village
- Location within Turkey
- Coordinates: 38.723°N 38.921°E
- Country: Turkey
- Province: Elazığ
- District: Elazığ
- Population (2021): 84
- Time zone: UTC+3 (TRT)

Üçağaç is a village in the Elazığ District of Elazığ Province in Turkey. Its population is 84 (2021).
