= Arındık, Elazığ =

Village in Turkey

Arındık
- Village
- Location within Turkey
- Coordinates: 38.6569°N 38.9727°E
- Country: Turkey
- Province: Elazığ
- District: Elazığ
- Population (2021): 90
- Time zone: UTC+3 (TRT)

Arındık is a village in the Elazığ District of Elazığ Province in Turkey. Its population is 90 (2021).
