= Şehsuvar, Elazığ =

Village in Turkey

Şehsuvar
- Village
- Location within Turkey
- Coordinates: 38.6202°N 39.6099°E
- Country: Turkey
- Province: Elazığ
- District: Elazığ
- Population (2021): 408
- Time zone: UTC+3 (TRT)

Şehsuvar is a village in the Elazığ District of Elazığ Province in Turkey. Its population is 408 (2021). The village is populated by Turks.
