= Gümüşbağlar, Elazığ =

Village in Turkey

Gümüşbağlar
- Village
- Location within Turkey
- Coordinates: 38°43′35″N 39°11′58″E
- Country: Turkey
- Province: Elazığ
- District: Elazığ
- Population (2021): 357
- Time zone: UTC+3 (TRT)

Gümüşbağlar is a village in the Elazığ District of Elazığ Province in Turkey. Its population is 357 (2021).
