= Dambüyük, Elazığ =

Village in Turkey

Dambüyük
- Village
- Location within Turkey
- Coordinates: 38°50′N 39°00′E
- Country: Turkey
- Province: Elazığ
- District: Elazığ
- Population (2021): 84
- Time zone: UTC+3 (TRT)

Dambüyük is a village in the Elazığ District of Elazığ Province in Turkey. Its population is 84 (2021).

== Infrastructure ==
There is a primary school in the village, but it isn't being used. The village has drinking water network, but there is no sewerage system. There is no PTT branch or PTT agency. There is no health centers and health posts. There is electricity and fixed phones also the road that provides access to the village is asphalt.
