= Sarıyakup, Elazığ =

Village in Turkey

Sarıyakup
- Village
- Location within Turkey
- Coordinates: 38.585°N 39.201°E
- Country: Turkey
- Province: Elazığ
- District: Elazığ
- Population (2021): 206
- Time zone: UTC+3 (TRT)

Sarıyakup is a village in the Elazığ District of Elazığ Province in Turkey. Its population is 206 (2021). The village is populated by Turks.
