= Kuyulu, Elazığ =

Village in Turkey

Kuyulu
- Village
- Location within Turkey
- Coordinates: 38.565°N 39.246°E
- Country: Turkey
- Province: Elazığ
- District: Elazığ
- Population (2021): 1,193
- Time zone: UTC+3 (TRT)

Kuyulu is a village in the Elazığ District of Elazığ Province in Turkey. Its population is 1,193 (2021).
