= Erbildi, Elazığ =

Village in Turkey

Erbildi
- Village
- Location within Turkey
- Coordinates: 38°47′N 39°20′E
- Country: Turkey
- Province: Elazığ
- District: Elazığ
- Population (2021): 92
- Time zone: UTC+3 (TRT)

Erbildi is a village in the Elazığ District of Elazığ Province in Turkey. Its population is 92 (2021).
