= İçme, Elazığ =

Village in Turkey

İçme
- Village
- Location within Turkey
- Coordinates: 38.612°N 39.552°E
- Country: Turkey
- Province: Elazığ
- District: Elazığ
- Population (2021): 526
- Time zone: UTC+3 (TRT)

İçme is a village in the Elazığ District of Elazığ Province in Turkey. Its population is 526 (2021). Before the 2013 reorganisation, it was a town (belde).
