= Karaçavuş, Elazığ =

Village in Turkey

Karaçavuş
- Village
- Location within Turkey
- Coordinates: 38.6619°N 38.9424°E
- Country: Turkey
- Province: Elazığ
- District: Elazığ
- Population (2021): 74
- Time zone: UTC+3 (TRT)

Karaçavuş is a village in the Elazığ District of Elazığ Province in Turkey. Its population is 74 (2021).
