= Bölüklü, Elazığ =

Village in Elazıǧ province, Turkey

Bölüklü
- Village
- Location within Turkey
- Coordinates: 38.4849°N 39.0555°E
- Country: Turkey
- Province: Elazığ
- District: Elazığ
- Population (2021): 88
- Time zone: UTC+3 (TRT)

Bölüklü is a village in the Elazığ District of Elazığ Province in Turkey. Its population was 88 in 2021. The village is populated by Kurds of the Herdî tribe.
