= Alaca, Elazığ =

Village in Turkey

Alaca
- Village
- Location within Turkey
- Coordinates: 38.7545°N 39.0631°E
- Country: Turkey
- Province: Elazığ
- District: Elazığ
- Population (2021): 74
- Time zone: UTC+3 (TRT)

Alaca is a village in the Elazığ District of Elazığ Province in Turkey. Its population is 74 (2021).
