= Tohumlu, Elazığ =

Village in Turkey

Tohumlu
- Village
- Location within Turkey
- Coordinates: 38°34′N 39°07′E
- Country: Turkey
- Province: Elazığ
- District: Elazığ
- Population (2021): 41
- Time zone: UTC+3 (TRT)

Tohumlu is a village in the Elazığ District of Elazığ Province in Turkey. Its population is 41 (2021). The village is populated by Kurds of the Herdî tribe.
