= Hoşköy, Elazığ =

Village in Turkey

Hoşköy
- Village
- Location within Turkey
- Coordinates: 38.683°N 39.395°E
- Country: Turkey
- Province: Elazığ
- District: Elazığ
- Population (2021): 297
- Time zone: UTC+3 (TRT)

Hoşköy is a village in the Elazığ District of Elazığ Province in Turkey. Its population is 297 (2021).
