= Dereboğazı, Elazığ =

Village in Turkey

Dereboğazı
- Village
- Location within Turkey
- Coordinates: 38°32′54″N 39°22′59″E
- Country: Turkey
- Province: Elazığ
- District: Elazığ
- Population (2021): 160
- Time zone: UTC+3 (TRT)

Dereboğazı is a village in the Elazığ District of Elazığ Province in Turkey. Its population is 160 (2021).
