= Bağdere, Elazığ =

Village in Turkey

Bağdere
- Village
- Location within Turkey
- Coordinates: 38.6041°N 39.0379°E
- Country: Turkey
- Province: Elazığ
- District: Elazığ
- Population (2021): 119
- Time zone: UTC+3 (TRT)

Bağdere is a village in the Elazığ District of Elazığ Province in Turkey. Its population is 119 (2021). The village is populated by Kurds of the Zeyve tribe.
