= Yenikonak, Elazığ =

Village in Turkey

Yenikonak
- Village
- Location within Turkey
- Coordinates: 38.609°N 38.968°E
- Country: Turkey
- Province: Elazığ
- District: Elazığ
- Population (2021): 102
- Time zone: UTC+3 (TRT)

Yenikonak is a village in the Elazığ District of Elazığ Province in Turkey. Its population is 102 (2021). The village is populated by Kurds of the Herdî tribe.
