= Kurtdere, Elazığ =

Village in Turkey

Kurtdere
- Village
- Location within Turkey
- Coordinates: 38.7839°N 39.2940°E
- Country: Turkey
- Province: Elazığ
- District: Elazığ
- Population (2021): 120
- Time zone: UTC+3 (TRT)

Kurtdere is a village in the Elazığ District of Elazığ Province in Turkey. Its population is 120 (2021).
