= Gözebaşı, Elazığ =

Village in Turkey

Gözebaşı
- Village
- Location within Turkey
- Coordinates: 38°31′0″N 39°14′43″E
- Country: Turkey
- Province: Elazığ
- District: Elazığ
- Population (2021): 610
- Time zone: UTC+3 (TRT)

Gözebaşı is a village in the Elazığ District of Elazığ Province in Turkey. Its population is 610 (2021).
