= Korucu, Elazığ =

Village in Turkey

Korucu
- Village
- Location within Turkey
- Coordinates: 38.589°N 39.517°E
- Country: Turkey
- Province: Elazığ
- District: Elazığ
- Population (2021): 599
- Time zone: UTC+3 (TRT)

Korucu is a village in the Elazığ District of Elazığ Province in Turkey. Its population is 599 (2021).
