= Değirmenönü, Elazığ =

Village in Turkey

Değirmenönü
- Village
- Location within Turkey
- Coordinates: 38°36′14″N 39°32′25″E
- Country: Turkey
- Province: Elazığ
- District: Elazığ
- Population (2021): 515
- Time zone: UTC+3 (TRT)

Değirmenönü is a village in the Elazığ District of Elazığ Province in Turkey. Its population is 515 (2021). The village is populated by Turks.
