= Kozluk, Elazığ =

Village in Turkey

Kozluk
- Village
- Location within Turkey
- Coordinates: 38.716°N 38.977°E
- Country: Turkey
- Province: Elazığ
- District: Elazığ
- Population (2021): 54
- Time zone: UTC+3 (TRT)

Kozluk is a village in the Elazığ District of Elazığ Province in Turkey. Its population is 54 (2021).
