= Fatmalı, Elazığ =

Village in Turkey

Fatmalı
- Village
- Location within Turkey
- Coordinates: 38°51′38″N 39°56′8″E
- Country: Turkey
- Province: Elazığ
- District: Elazığ
- Population (2021): 112
- Time zone: UTC+3 (TRT)

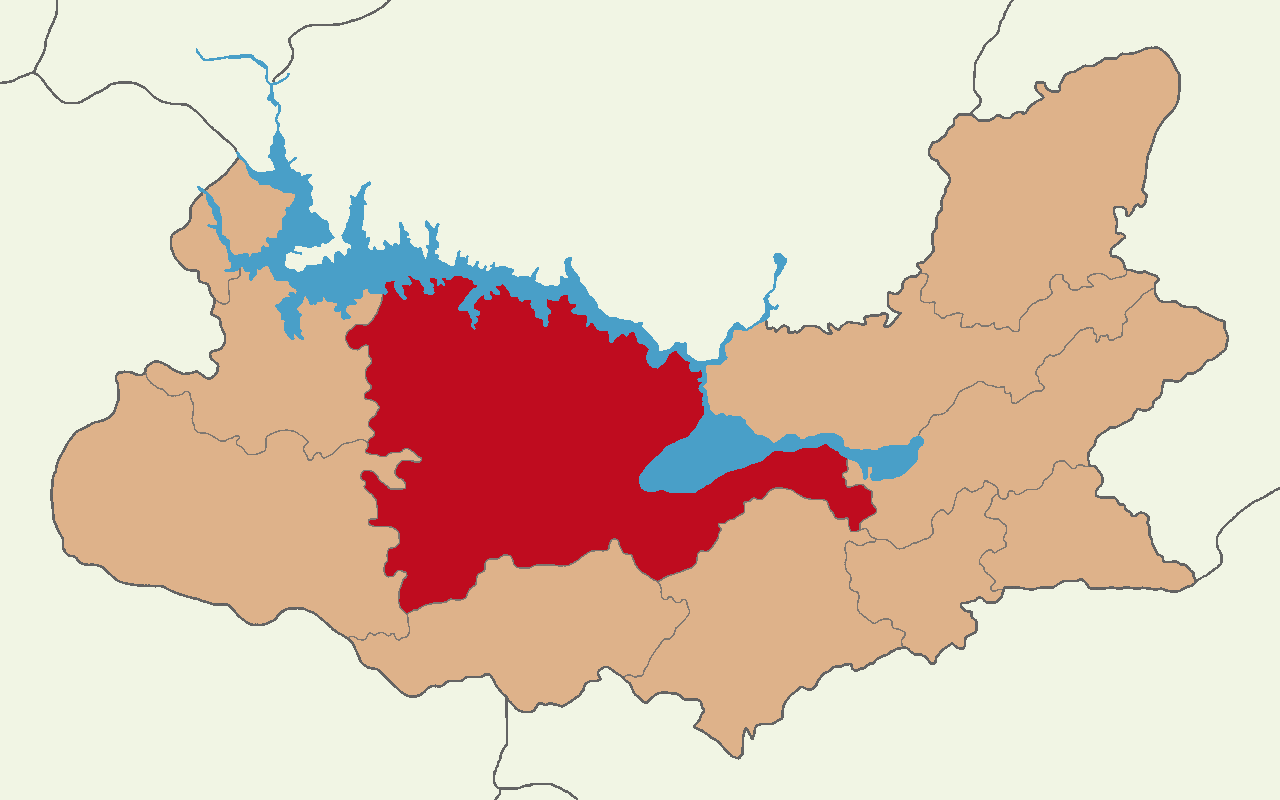

Fatmalı is a village in the Elazığ District of Elazığ Province in Turkey. Its population is 112 (2021).
