= Şeyhhacı =

Village in Turkey

- Village
- Location in Turkey
- Coordinates: 38.6205°N 39.5847°E
- Country: Turkey
- Province: Elazığ
- District: Elazığ
- Population (2021): 428
- Time zone: UTC+3 (TRT)

Şeyhhacı (between 1960 and 2014: Yukarıbağ) is a village in the Elazığ District of Elazığ Province in Turkey. Its population is 428 (2021). The village is populated by Turks.
