= Karaali, Elazığ =

Village in Turkey

Karaali
- Village
- Location within Turkey
- Coordinates: 38.5666°N 38.9433°E
- Country: Turkey
- Province: Elazığ
- District: Elazığ
- Population (2021): 159
- Time zone: UTC+3 (TRT)

Karaali is a village in the Elazığ District of Elazığ Province in Turkey. Its population is 159 (2021). The village is populated by Kurds of the Parçikan tribe.
