= Sarıbük =

Village in Turkey

- Village
- Location in Turkey
- Coordinates: 38.752°N 39.417°E
- Country: Turkey
- Province: Elazığ
- District: Elazığ
- Population (2021): 100
- Time zone: UTC+3 (TRT)

Sarıbük is a village in the Elazığ District of Elazığ Province in Turkey. Its population is 100 (2021).
