= Güzelyurt, Elazığ =

Village in Turkey

Öksüzuşağı
- Village
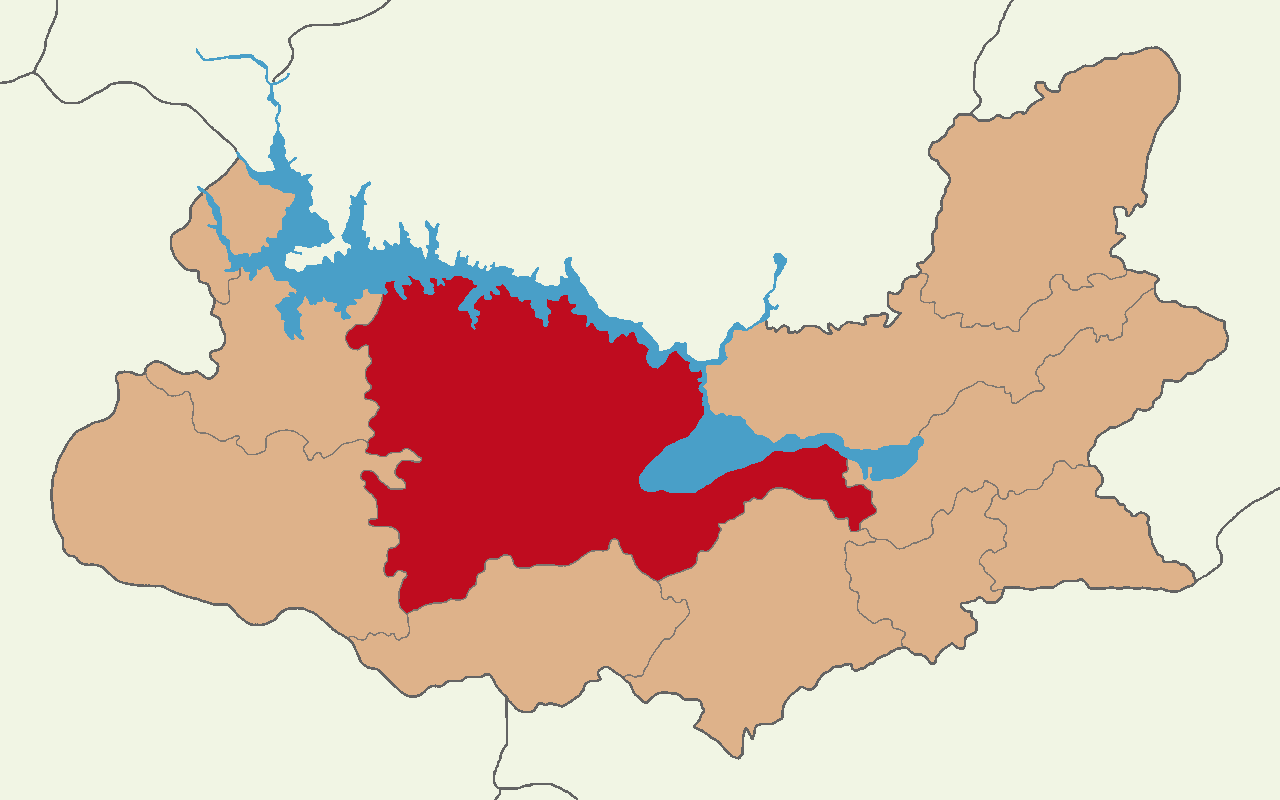
- Location of Elazığ Central District

- Location within Turkey
- Coordinates: 38.468°N 39.053°E
- Country: Turkey
- Province: Elazığ
- District: Elazığ
- Population (2021): 208
- Time zone: UTC+3 (TRT)

Güzelyurt formerly Öksüzuşağı is a village in the Elazığ District of Elazığ Province in Turkey. Its population is 208 (2021). The village is populated by Kurds of the Herdî tribe.
