= Kadir Mısıroğlu =

Turkish conspiracy theorist (1933–2019)

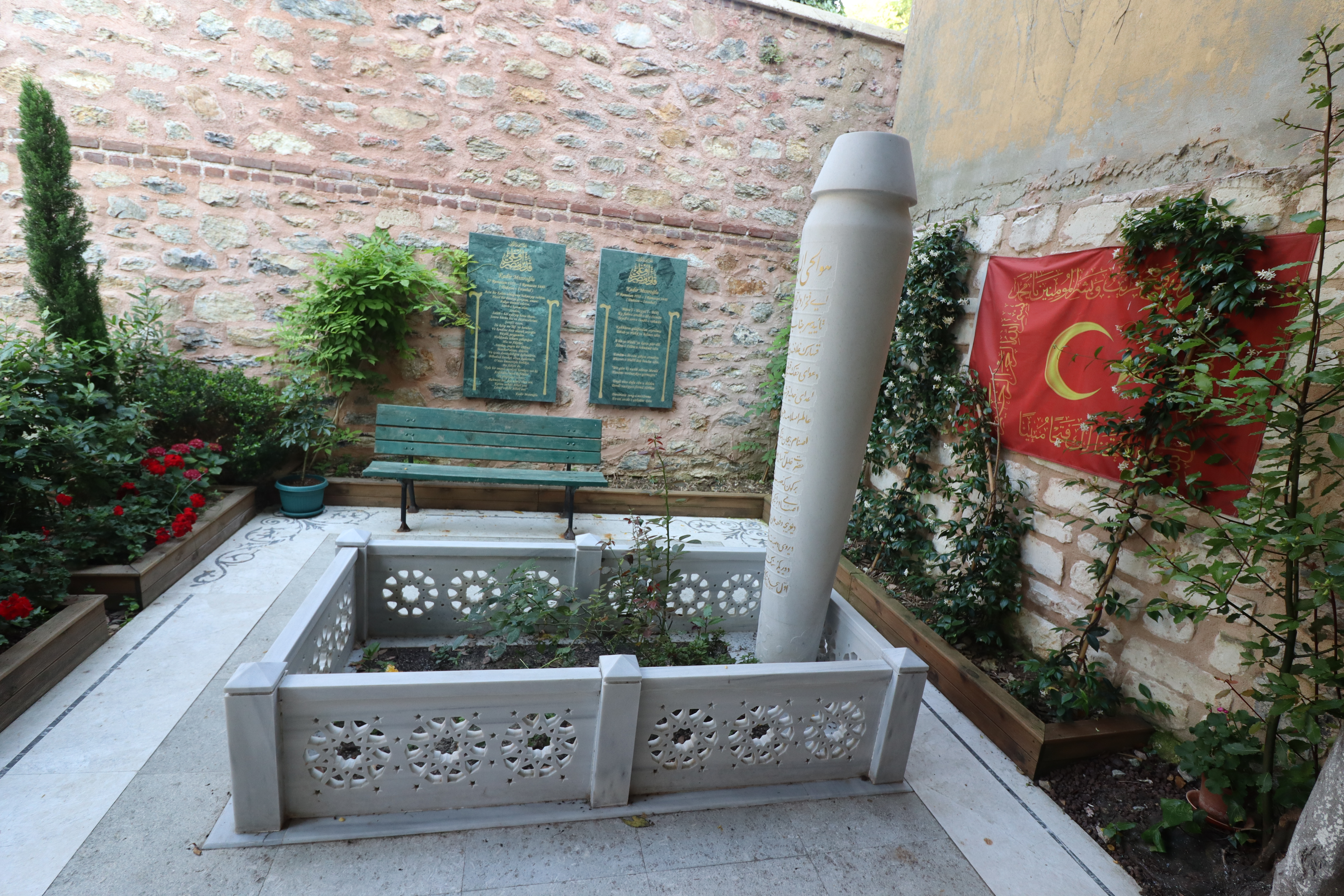
- His grave in the courtyard of the Nasuhi Mehmet Efendi Mosque, Üsküdar, Istanbul
- Born: 24 January 1933; Akçaabat, Trabzon, Turkey
- Died: 5 May 2019 (aged 86); Istanbul, Turkey
- Education: Istanbul University
- Occupations: Publisher, writer, lawyer
- Spouse: Aynur Aydınaslan (m. 1961)
- Children: 3

Kadir Mısıroğlu (24 January 1933 – 5 May 2019) was a Turkish lawyer, Islamist writer, publisher, and conspiracy theorist. He was known for his staunch opposition to the early Kemalist regime of Turkey and advocating the restoration of the caliphate. He propagated neo-Ottomanist historical revisionism in line with his Islamist and monarchist ideology, and frequently promoted controversial alternative historical narratives and conspiracy theories. However, this subjective approach contained serious flaws, such as methodological problems and the distortion of texts. His works have been criticised for their approach, awareness and bias.

== Biography ==
Mısıroğlu was born in Akçaabat in Trabzon Province. During his time at Istanbul University in the 1950s, he became the president of the Trabzon High School Graduates Association in his sophomore year, and opened seven student dormitories. He married Aynur Aydınaslan in 1961 and had three children: Abdullah Sünusi (1963), Fatıma Mehlika (1965), and Mehmed Selman (1973).

In 1964, he founded the publishing house Sebil and then the magazine named Sebil in 1976. He wrote over 50 books. Also in 1964, he reached fame through his book Lausanne, Victory or Defeat? (Lozan Zafer mi, Hezimet mi?).

In 1977, he was a losing candidate of the National Salvation Party for the Grand National Assembly of Turkey. Following the 1980 Turkish coup d'état, he fled and applied for asylum in West Germany and settled in Frankfurt, then applied for asylum in the United Kingdom and settled in London. In 1983, he was stripped of his Turkish citizenship by the military government for failing to return to the country. He remained stateless until his citizenship was reinstated in 1991. Upon his return, he founded the Ottoman Science and Wisdom Foundation (Osmanlılar İlim ve İrfan Vakfı) in 1994, where he regularly held Saturday Conferences to disseminate his historical and political views.

Following multiple stays for a year and a half at Acıbadem Altunizade Hospital for diabetes, he died on 5 May 2019 due to multiple-organ failure. His funeral was held at Çamlıca Mosque where multitudes of Islamists were in attendance. He was interred in the cemetery of the Nasuhi dergah and mosque at Üsküdar, Istanbul.

=== Beliefs and persona ===
Mısıroğlu has been described as a conspiracy theorist. A defining element of his public persona was his constant wearing of an Ottoman fez. This was widely regarded as a symbolic protest against the Republic's Hat Law of 1925 and a visual declaration of his neo-Ottomanist identity.

He was known for his outspoken stance against Atatürk's reforms and Kemalism, and identified as an apologist of Islamism and Pan-Islamism. He argued that the caliphate could be even restored under a U.S.-backed caliph, and said that an American delegation met with him on this topic during the presidency of Bill Clinton.

He supported Fethullah Gülen and his movement, believing that if they organized in Europe for an Islamist agenda, they would focus on the youth. He established a cordial relationship with Gülen. However, then he accused the movement of being business oriented rather than religiously oriented, and Gülen of making false claims, such as the Islamic prophet Muhammad regularly visiting his schools.

Mısıroğlu gained infamy with his quote "I wish the Greeks had won, so neither the caliphate nor the sharia would be abolished!" on the Greco-Turkish conflict of the Turkish War of Independence. For him, living under Islamic rule in an enemy-occupied country was preferable to living under secular rule in a free country.

He frequently promoted unconventional claims, such as Joseph Stalin ordering his army to read the Quran, specifically the Ayat Al-Kursi, towards the sand to gain an advantage against the Nazis; William Shakespeare being a secret Muslim whose real name was Sheikh Pir; and Karl Marx's Das Kapital being dictated by demons.

He frequently directed harsh criticism towards prominent figures of the Republican era. Notably, he faced legal action and public backlash for using severe insults against Mehmet Akif Ersoy, the author of the Turkish National Anthem. His works came under criticism by historian İlber Ortaylı for lacking scientific approach, knowledge and distorting the facts.

In one his Saturday Conferences, dated 7 May 2016, he said: "I am a monarchist. I am not a republican. I said this in 1991, too. Islam prescribes neither a republic, nor a sultanate. Islam prescribes a spirit. The form of government depends on the circumstances. If you are a small state, you become a republic. If you are a global state, you cannot have a republic."
