= Koruköy, Elazığ =

Village in Turkey

Koruköy
- Village
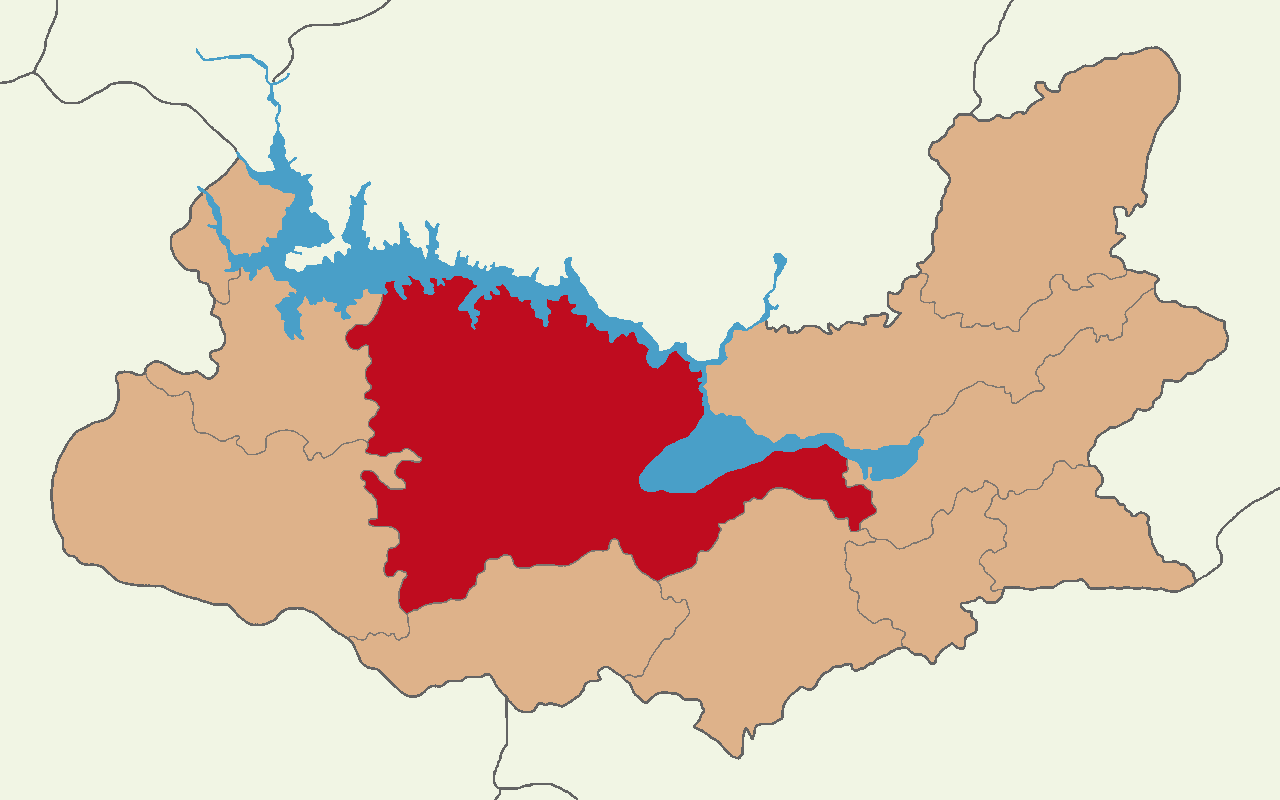

- Location within Turkey
- Coordinates: 38°49′23″N 39°0′58″E
- Country: Turkey
- Province: Elazığ
- District: Elazığ
- Population (2021): 303
- Time zone: UTC+3 (TRT)

Koruköy is a village in the Elazığ District of Elazığ Province in Turkey. Its population is 303 (2021). The village is populated by Turks.
