= Ormanpınar, Arıcak =

Village in Turkey

Ormanpınar
- Village
- Location in Turkey
- Coordinates: 38°31′43″N 40°4′28″E
- Country: Turkey
- Province: Elazığ
- District: Arıcak
- Population (2021): 260
- Time zone: UTC+3 (TRT)

Ormanpınar is a village in the Arıcak District of Elazığ Province in Turkey. Its population is 260 (2021). The village is populated by Kurds.
