= Bozçavuş, Arıcak =

Village in Turkey

Bozçavuş
- Village
- Location in Turkey
- Coordinates: 38°33′N 40°12′E
- Country: Turkey
- Province: Elazığ
- District: Arıcak
- Population (2021): 425
- Time zone: UTC+3 (TRT)

Bozçavuş is a village in the Arıcak District of Elazığ Province in Turkey. Its population is 425 (2021). The village is populated by Kurds.
