= Akçaabat =

- District and municipality
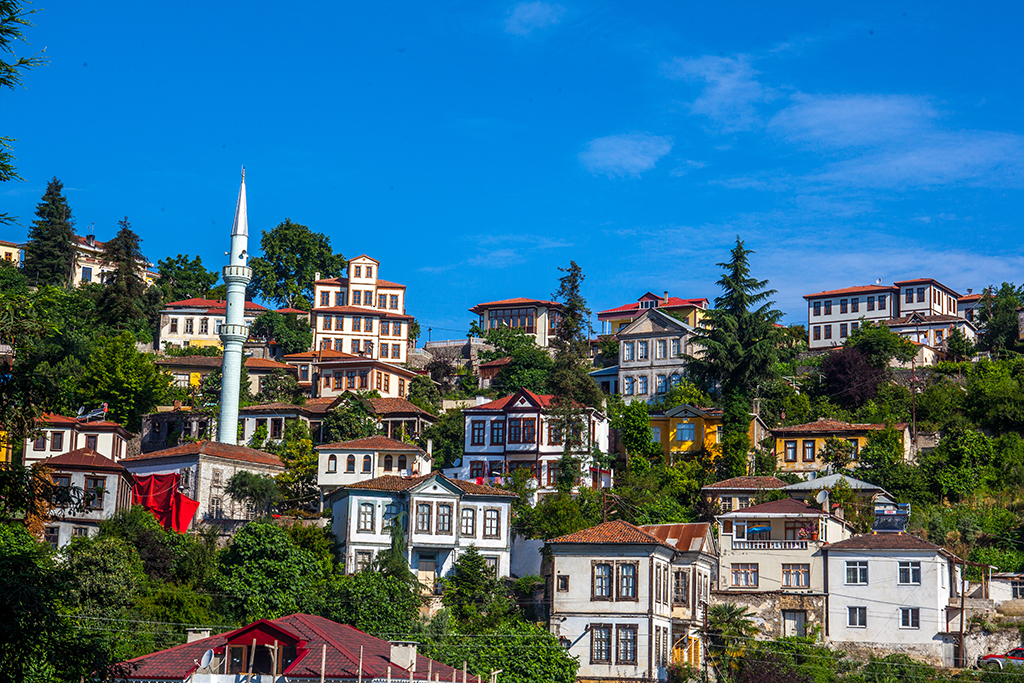

- Logo

- Location within Turkey
- Coordinates: 41°01′N 39°33′E
- Country: Turkey
- Province: Trabzon

Government
  - Mayor: Osman Nuri Ekim (AKP)
- Area: 375 km^{2} (145 sq mi)
- Elevation: 10 m (33 ft)
- Population (2022): 129,290
  - Density: 345/km^{2} (893/sq mi)
- Time zone: UTC+3 (TRT)
- Postal code: 61300
- Area code: 0462
- Climate: Cfa
- Website: www.akcaabat.bel.tr

Akçaabat is a municipality and district of Trabzon Province, Turkey. Its area is 375 km^{2}, and its population is 129,290 (2022). It lies on the Black Sea coast, to the west of the city of Trabzon. Its elevation is ten metres (33 ft). Akçaabat is a coastal town known for its local soccer team Akçaabat Sebatspor, its kofta dish Akçaabat köfte and the Akçaabat Horonu dance. Akçaabat has hosted an international folklore festival since 1990, and it was a venue for the archery and athletics competitions of the First Black Sea Games held in 2007.

== Name ==
The first settlers of the town came from the ancient Greek Miletus and named the town "Platana" because of the abundance of plane trees (Greek Plátanos, Πλάτανος, Latin Platanus). In Turkish, the name was reinterpreted as Pulathane 'land of iron' and the surrounding district became Akçeabad 'abundance of money'.

== Climate ==
The climate in this area is characterized by relatively mild temperatures and evenly distributed precipitation throughout the year. The Köppen Climate System classifies this climate as humid subtropical, abbreviated Cfa.

Climate data for Akçaabat
Month	Jan	Feb	Mar	Apr	May	Jun	Jul	Aug	Sep	Oct	Nov	Dec	Year
Mean daily maximum °C (°F)	10 (50)	10 (50)	11 (51)	15 (59)	18 (64)	23 (73)	26 (78)	26 (78)	24 (75)	20 (68)	16 (60)	13 (55)	17 (62)
Mean daily minimum °C (°F)	3 (37)	3 (37)	4 (39)	8 (46)	12 (53)	16 (60)	19 (66)	19 (66)	16 (60)	12 (53)	8 (46)	5 (41)	10 (50)
Average precipitation mm (inches)	79 (3.1)	56 (2.2)	46 (1.8)	48 (1.9)	43 (1.7)	46 (1.8)	28 (1.1)	43 (1.7)	58 (2.3)	99 (3.9)	91 (3.6)	94 (3.7)	730 (28.7)
Source: Weatherbase

== History ==
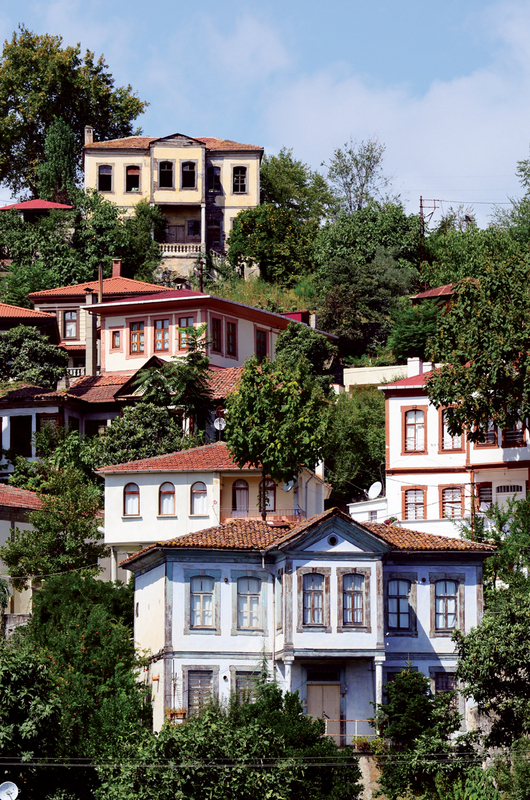
Historic mansions in Akçaabat (formerly Platana village)

Founded as a trade colony of Miletus around the 7th century BC, the town came under Persian rule around the 6th century BC. After a brief rule under Alexander the Great, Akçaabat was incorporated into the Kingdom of Pontus established by Mithridates I of Pontus around the 3rd century BC. After the dissolution of the Kingdom of Pontus around 60 BC, the Romans took control of the region surrounding Trabzon. Serving as a natural port for Trabzon, Akçaabat was one of the important towns of eastern Black Sea region, and thus Pontus region of the Roman Empire.

Although attacked several times by different nations and tribes Akçaabat remained under Byzantine control until a branch of the Byzantine dynasty, Komnenos family established their own kingdom with the help of Georgian queen Tamara after the Latin capture of Constantinople in 1204. This new state, called the Empire of Trebizond, survived as a vassal kingdom under the Seljukid Empire until Sultan Mehmet II of the Ottoman Empire added Trabzon to his territories in October 1461. The first battle between the Ottoman Navy and the Komnenos Navy occurred to the west of Akçaabat port, around Akçakale where the Trapezuntines lost eight ships. As Akçaabat lies to the west of Trabzon, Mehmet II used Akçaabat as his base for the final conquest of Trebizond. Akçakale castle "the White Castle" held its defense until 1468 when the Ottomans finally succeeded in their siege.

During the centuries of Ottoman rule, Akçaabat remained the main and most important town center of Trebizond after the city of Trebizond itself. After the establishment of Akçaabat municipality in 1880, Akçaabat officially gained the status of "town" according to the municipal and administrative reform of 1884 which reorganized the administrative structure in the provinces of the Ottoman Empire.

In 1810 the Russian Navy landed troops on Akçaabat's shores around Salacik where the defense of the townspeople repulsed the Russian landing after several days.

During the First World War, Tsarist Russian armies occupied Akçaabat on 20 April 1916. As the Russian forces withdrew after the Russian Revolution, Ottoman forces recaptured Akçaabat on 17 February 1918. After the establishment of Turkish Republic in 1923, the Greek inhabitants were forced to leave for Greece due to the population exchange. Akçaabat was designated as one of the towns of the city of Trabzon according to the new administrative organization. Akçaabat has remained as the biggest town of Trabzon until today. Until the 1980s Akçaabat did not witness major changes in its natural and social composition despite being the closest town to Trabzon city center, however, with the return of the German Turks people to their hometowns and flow of rural [village] population to the town center, the composition of the town center changed. The population of the town skyrocketed from 15000 in the 1980s to 50000 in 2008. The unique old-style houses [Akçaabat evleri] were replaced by huge apartment blocks, the sea has been constantly filled in order to gain land to meet rising demand for expansion of inter-city roads and recreational lands. The dissolution of the USSR in 1990 brought the influx of former Soviet citizens who mainly involved in small trades and sex tourism, and this brought major changes in social composition. In addition, the flood that occurred in June 1990, which killed 21 people and caused significant damage, necessitated the rebuilding of the town. Today, Akçaabat is one of the most densely populated towns on the Black Sea coast.

=== Chronology ===
- 700 BC: Akçaabat becomes one of the extensions of Miletos Trade Colonies.
- 312 BC: Akçaabat was incorporated to Pontus kingdom of Mithridates.
- 63 BC: Akçaabat was conquered by the Roman Empire.
- 330 AC: Akçaabat became part of the Byzantine Empire.
- 1204 AC: Akçaabat becomes part of the Empire of Trebizond.
- 1461: Akçaabat and Trabzon were added to Ottoman Empire territories by Mehmed II the Conqueror.
- 1810: Russian naval attack on the town was repulsed.
- 1880: Akçaabat Municipality was established.
- 1884: Akçaabat was awarded with Township according to the new regulations in administrative organization.
- 20 April 1916: Russian forces capture and occupy Akçaabat.
- 17 February 1918: Ottoman forces recapture Akçaabat.
- 1923: Akçaabat Sebatspor was founded under the name of Idman Sebatyurdu as one of the first three soccer teams from Trabzon.
- 19–20 June 1990: Akçaabat suffered a major flood due to heavy rain and flooding of the rivers.
- 2002: Akçaabat Sebatspor became the first Turkish football team from a town center (except the towns of Istanbul, Ankara, and İzmir) promoted to Süper Lig.

=== Saint Michael Church ===
Saint Michael Church, also known as 'Saint Joseph Church', is a large church in the town outskirts of Akçaabat. The church was built in 1332 in memory of the victory of the Byzantine Emperor Manuel Komnenos against the Seljuks. In 1846 it was repaired by the citizens of the city. Later, in 1922 after the Greek citizens left it was turned into a residential home. After the death of the family members who lived there, the building was neglected and damaged. In 2019, started the restoration and in 2021 after the restoration finished is used for social and cultural activities by the Ministry of Culture and Tourism.

== Composition ==
There are 78 neighbourhoods in Akçaabat District:

- Acısu
- Adacık
- Ağaçlı
- Akçakale
- Akçaköy
- Akdamar
- Akören
- Akpınar
- Alsancak
- Ambarcık
- Arpacılı
- Aydınköy
- Benlitaş Baltacı
- Bozdoğan
- Çamlıca
- Çamlıdere
- Cevizli
- Cevizlik
- Çiçeklidüz
- Çilekli
- Çınarlık
- Çolaklı
- Çukurca
- Darıca
- Demirci
- Demirkapı
- Demirtaş
- Derecik
- Doğanköy
- Dörtyol
- Dürbinar
- Erikli
- Esentepe
- Eskiköy
- Fındıklı
- Fıstıklı
- Gümüşlü
- Helvacı
- Işıklar
- Kaleönü
- Karaçayır
- Karaman
- Karpınar
- Kavaklı
- Kayalar
- Kemaliye
- Kirazlık
- Koçlu
- Kuruçam
- Maden
- Mersin
- Meşeli
- Meydankaya
- Nefsipulathane
- Oğulkaya Yolbaşı
- Ortaalan
- Ortaköy
- Ortamahalle
- Osmanbaba
- Özakdamar
- Özdemirci
- Salacık
- Sarıca
- Sarıtaş
- Sertkaya
- Şinik
- Söğütlü
- Tatlısu
- Tütüncüler
- Uçarsu
- Uğurlu
- Yaylacık
- Yeniköy
- Yenimahalle
- Yeşiltepe
- Yeşilyurt
- Yıldızlı
- Zaferli

== Notable people from Akçaabat ==
- Ekrem İmamoğlu, politician
- Erol Günaydın, actor
- Hasan Saka, politician
- Haydar Baş, politician
- Hüseyin Türkmen, footballer
- Kadir Mısıroğlu, conspiracy theorist
- Mehmet Bölükbaşı, footballer
- Metin Aktaş, footballer
- Mustafa Yücel Özbilgin, magistrate
- Sabahattin Eyüboğlu, writer
