= İkitepe, Elazığ =

Village in Turkey

İkitepe
- Village
- Location within Turkey
- Coordinates: 38.569°N 39.324°E
- Country: Turkey
- Province: Elazığ
- District: Elazığ
- Population (2021): 243
- Time zone: UTC+3 (TRT)

İkitepe is a village in the Elazığ District of Elazığ Province in Turkey. Its population is 243 (2021).
