= Karakaş, Arıcak =

Village in Turkey

Karakaş
- Village
- Location in Turkey
- Coordinates: 38°32′15″N 40°13′16″E
- Country: Turkey
- Province: Elazığ
- District: Arıcak
- Population (2021): 439
- Time zone: UTC+3 (TRT)

Karakaş is a village in the Arıcak District of Elazığ Province in Turkey. Its population is 439 (2021). The village is populated by Kurds.
