= Çavuşdere, Arıcak =

Village in Turkey

Çavuşdere
- Village
- Location in Turkey
- Coordinates: 38°34′34″N 40°04′13″E
- Country: Turkey
- Province: Elazığ
- District: Arıcak
- Population (2021): 9
- Time zone: UTC+3 (TRT)

Çavuşdere is a village in the Arıcak District of Elazığ Province in Turkey. Its population is 9 (2021). The village is populated by Kurds.
