= Koçkale, Elazığ =

Village in Turkey

Koçkale
- Village
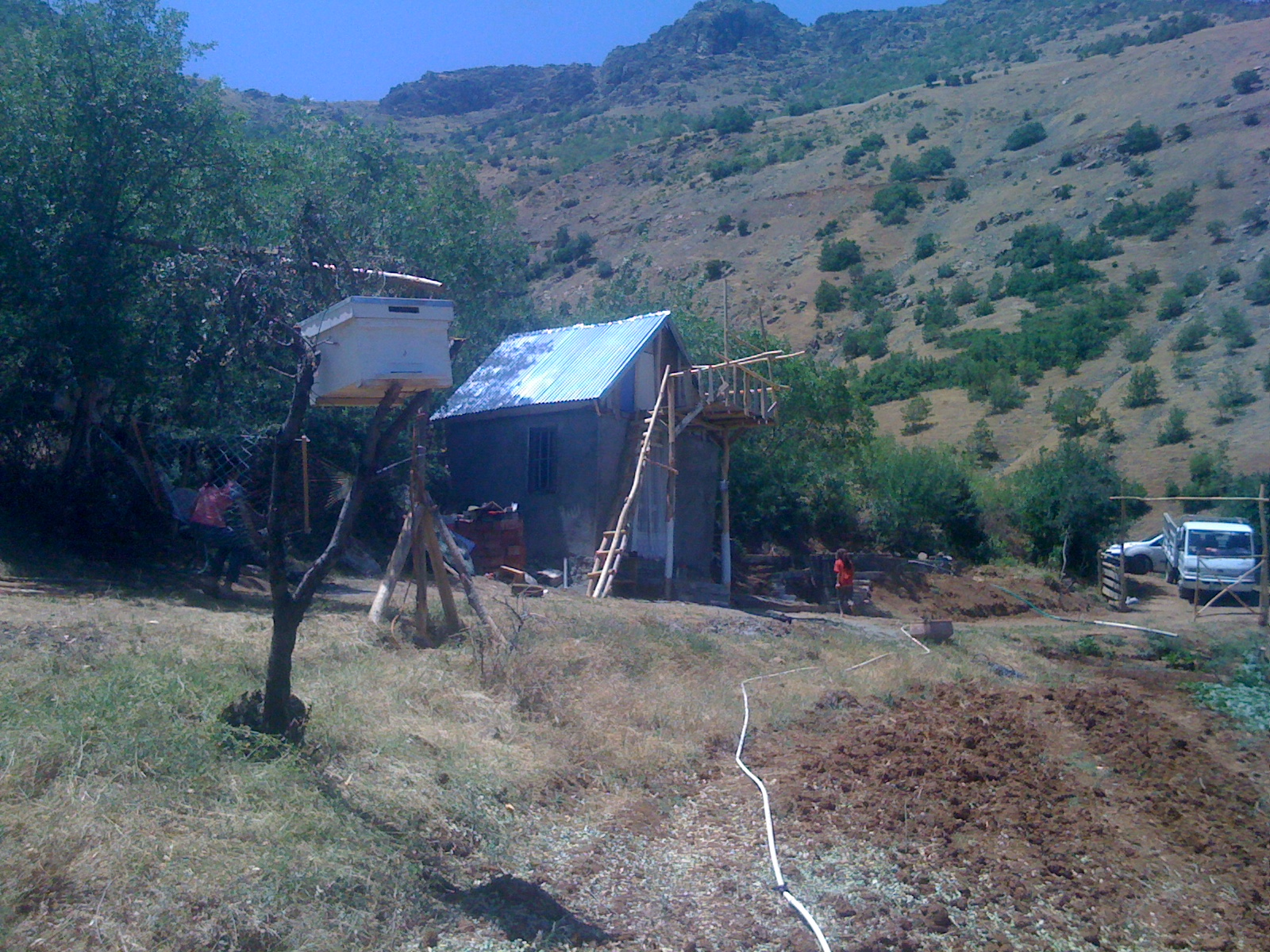

- Location within Turkey
- Coordinates: 38°35′N 39°28′E
- Country: Turkey
- Province: Elazığ
- District: Elazığ
- Population (2021): 227
- Time zone: UTC+3 (TRT)

Koçkale is a village in the Elazığ District of Elazığ Province in Turkey. Its population is 227 (2021).
