= Salkaya, Elâzığ =

Village in Turkey

Salkaya
- Village
- Location within Turkey
- Coordinates: 38°47′N 39°12′E
- Country: Turkey
- Province: Elazığ
- District: Elazığ
- Population (2021): 586
- Time zone: UTC+3 (TRT)

Salkaya is a village in the Elazığ District of Elazığ Province in Turkey. Its population is 586 (2021).

In 2025, a Roman mosaic depicting many different animals, dating from sometime from the end of the 3rd century AD to the middle of the 4th century AD, was discovered in the village. It was excavated by the Elazığ Archaeology and Ethnography Museum.
