= Küplüce, Arıcak =

Village in Turkey

Küplüce
- Village
- Location in Turkey
- Coordinates: 38°32′11″N 40°10′30″E
- Country: Turkey
- Province: Elazığ
- District: Arıcak
- Population (2021): 812
- Time zone: UTC+3 (TRT)

Küplüce is a village in the Arıcak District of Elazığ Province in Turkey. Its population is 812 (2021). The village is populated by Kurds.
