= Sultanuşağı =

Village in Elazığ Province, Turkey

- Village
- Location in Turkey
- Coordinates: 38.603°N 38.939°E
- Country: Turkey
- Province: Elazığ
- District: Elazığ
- Population (2021): 87
- Time zone: UTC+3 (TRT)

Sultanuşağı is a village in the Elazığ District of Elazığ Province in Turkey. The village is populated by Kurds of the Herdî tribe and had a population of 87 in 2021.

The hamlets of Budaklı, Mollahasan and Süleyman are attached to the village.
