= Cevizdere, Elazığ =

Cevizdere
- Village
- Location within Turkey
- Coordinates: 38°32′N 39°22′E
- Country: Turkey
- Province: Elazığ
- District: Elazığ
- Elevation: 1,089 m (3,573 ft)
- Population (2021): 117
- Time zone: UTC+3 (TRT)
- Postal code: 23250
- Climate: Csa

Cevizdere is a village of Elazığ District in Elazığ Province in eastern Turkey. Its population is 117 (2021). The village is populated by Kurds and is the village where Dursun Karataş came from. It is on Lake Hazar.

== History ==
The old name of the village is Kürdemlik.
