= Gülpınar, Elazığ =

Village in Turkey

Gülpınar
- Village
- Location in Turkey
- Coordinates: 38.473°N 39.073°E
- Country: Turkey
- Province: Elazığ
- District: Elazığ
- Population (2021): 83
- Time zone: UTC+3 (TRT)

Gülpınar (formerly: Sarıtosun) is a village in the Elazığ District of Elazığ Province in Turkey. Its population is 83 (2021). The village is populated by Kurds of the Herdî tribe.
