= Kelmahmut =

Village in Turkey

- Village
- Location in Turkey
- Coordinates: 38°33′N 39°03′E
- Country: Turkey
- Province: Elazığ
- District: Elazığ
- Population (2021): 121
- Time zone: UTC+3 (TRT)

Kelmahmut (formerly: Gülmahmut) is a village in the Elazığ District of Elazığ Province in Turkey. Its population is 121 (2021).
