= Çevrecik, Arıcak =

Village in Turkey

Çevrecik
- Village
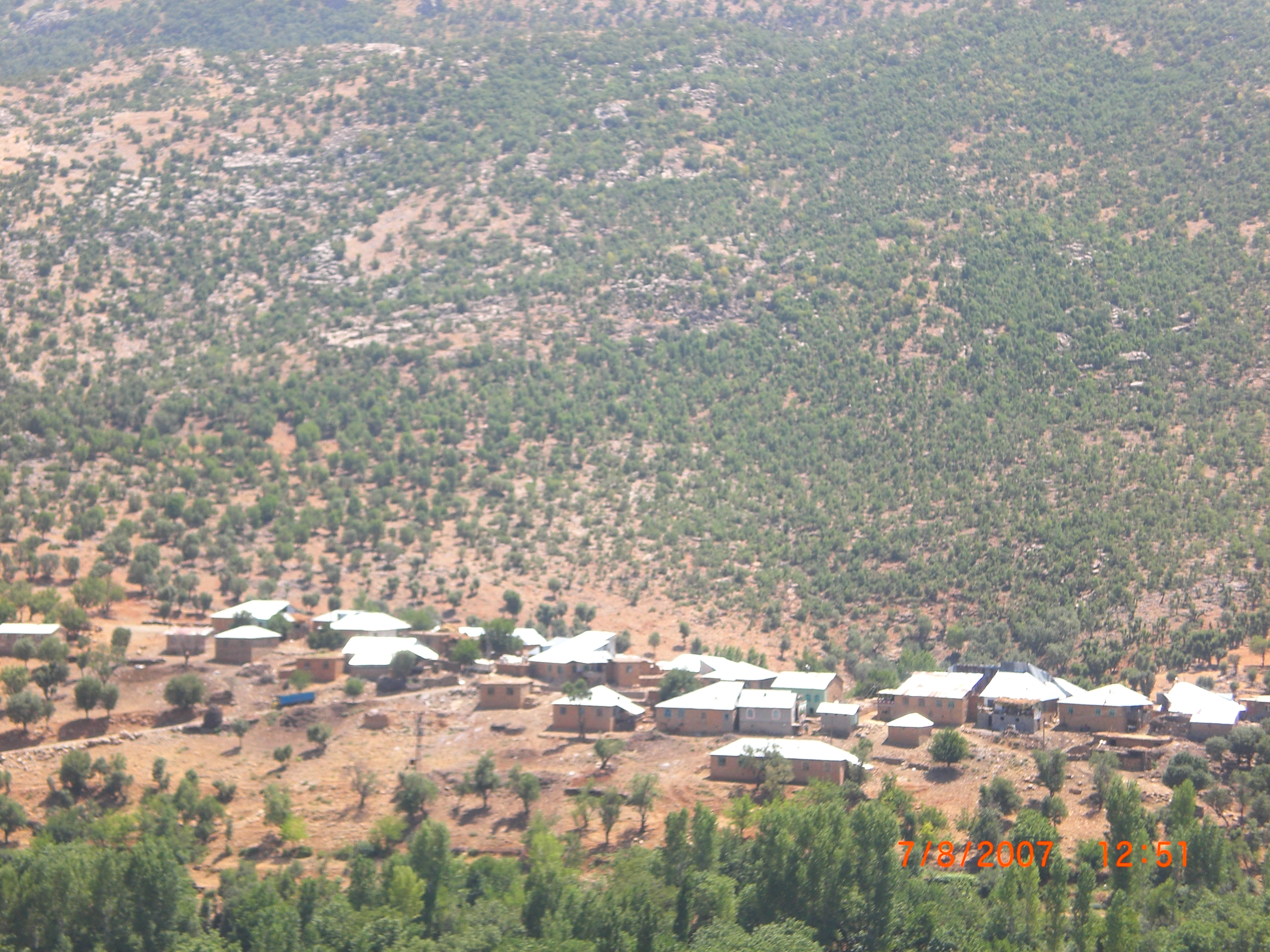

- Location within Turkey
- Coordinates: 38°29′27″N 40°5′17″E
- Country: Turkey
- Province: Elazığ
- District: Arıcak
- Population (2021): 123
- Time zone: UTC+3 (TRT)

Çevrecik is a village in the Arıcak District of Elazığ Province in Turkey. Its population is 123 (2021). The village is populated by Kurds.
