= Kambertepe, Arıcak =

Village in Turkey

Kambertepe
- Village
- Location in Turkey
- Coordinates: 38°32′N 40°03′E
- Country: Turkey
- Province: Elazığ
- District: Arıcak
- Population (2021): 356
- Time zone: UTC+3 (TRT)

Kambertepe is a village in the Arıcak District of Elazığ Province in Turkey. Its population is 356 (2021). The village is populated by Zazaki.
