= Sakabaşı =

Village in Turkey

- Village
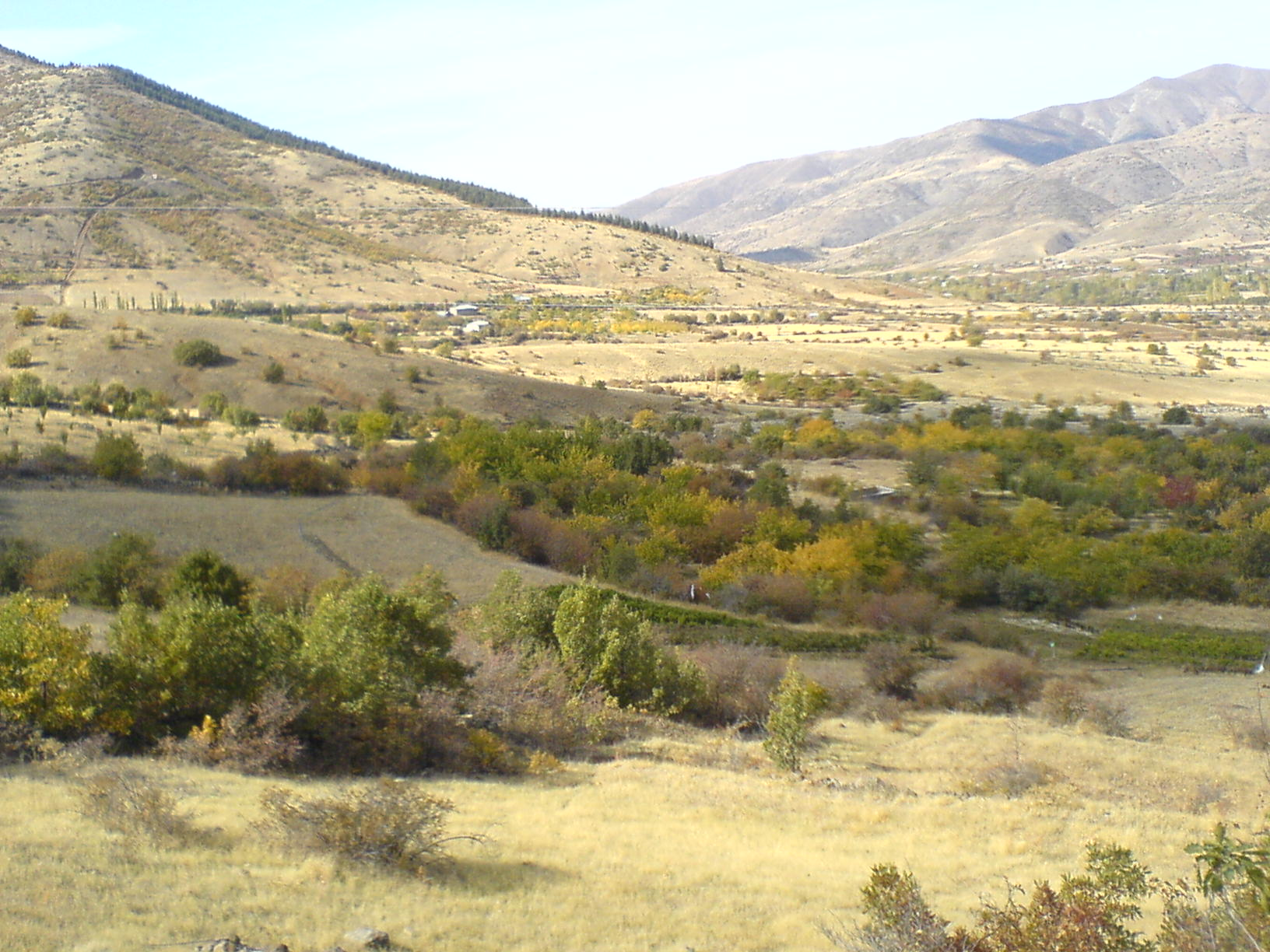

- Location within Turkey
- Coordinates: 38°28′26″N 38°59′30″E
- Country: Turkey
- Province: Elazığ
- District: Elazığ
- Population (2021): 327
- Time zone: UTC+3 (TRT)

Sakabaşı is a village in the Elazığ District of Elazığ Province in Turkey. Its population is 327 (2021). The village is populated by Kurds of the Parçikan tribe.
