= Yazıpınarı, Elazığ =

Village in Turkey

Yazıpınarı
- Village
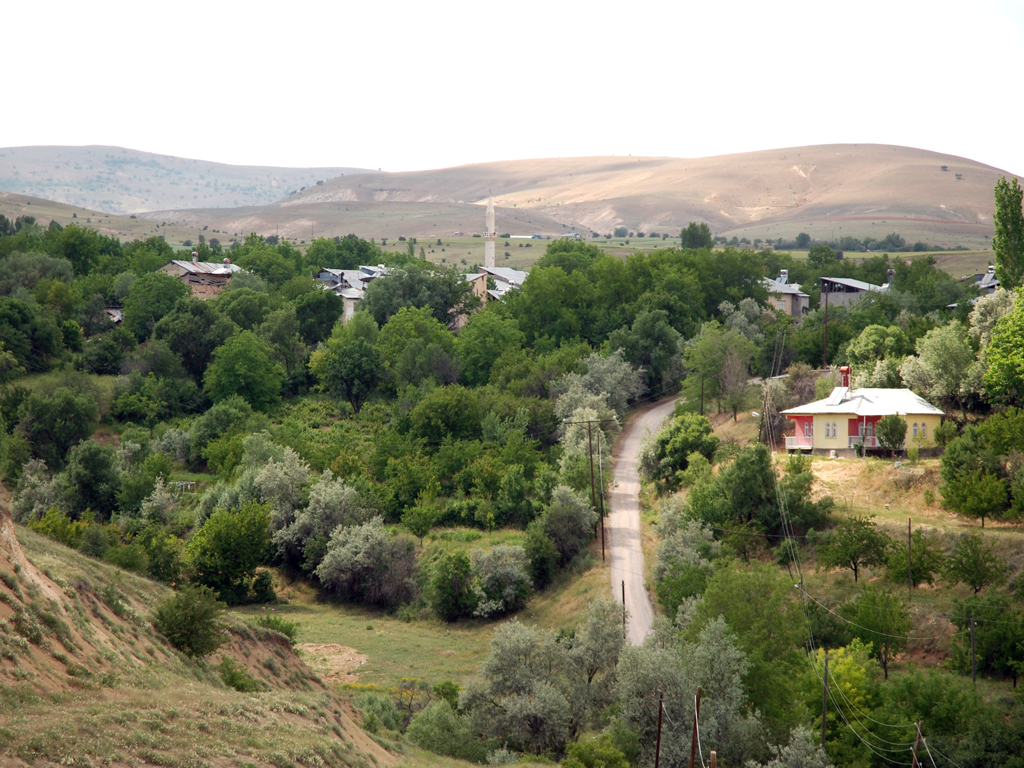

- Location within Turkey
- Coordinates: 38°38′N 38°57′E
- Country: Turkey
- Province: Elazığ
- District: Elazığ
- Population (2021): 41
- Time zone: UTC+3 (TRT)

Yazıpınarı is a village in the Elazığ District of Elazığ Province in Turkey. The village is populated by Kurds of the Herdî tribe.
