= Alpağut, Elazığ =

Village in Turkey

Alpağut
- Village
- Location in Turkey
- Coordinates: 38.7224°N 39.0077°E
- Country: Turkey
- Province: Elazığ
- District: Elazığ
- Population (2021): 245
- Time zone: UTC+3 (TRT)

Alpağut is a village in the Ağın District of Elazığ Province in Turkey. Its population is 245 (2021).
