= Erbağı, Arıcak =

Village in Turkey

Erbağı
- Village
- Location in Turkey
- Coordinates: 38°33′N 40°11′E
- Country: Turkey
- Province: Elazığ
- District: Arıcak
- Population (2021): 332
- Time zone: UTC+3 (TRT)

Erbağı is a village in the Arıcak District of Elazığ Province in Turkey. Its population is 332 (2021). The village is populated by Kurds.
