= Küllük, Elâzığ =

Village in Turkey

Küllük
- Village
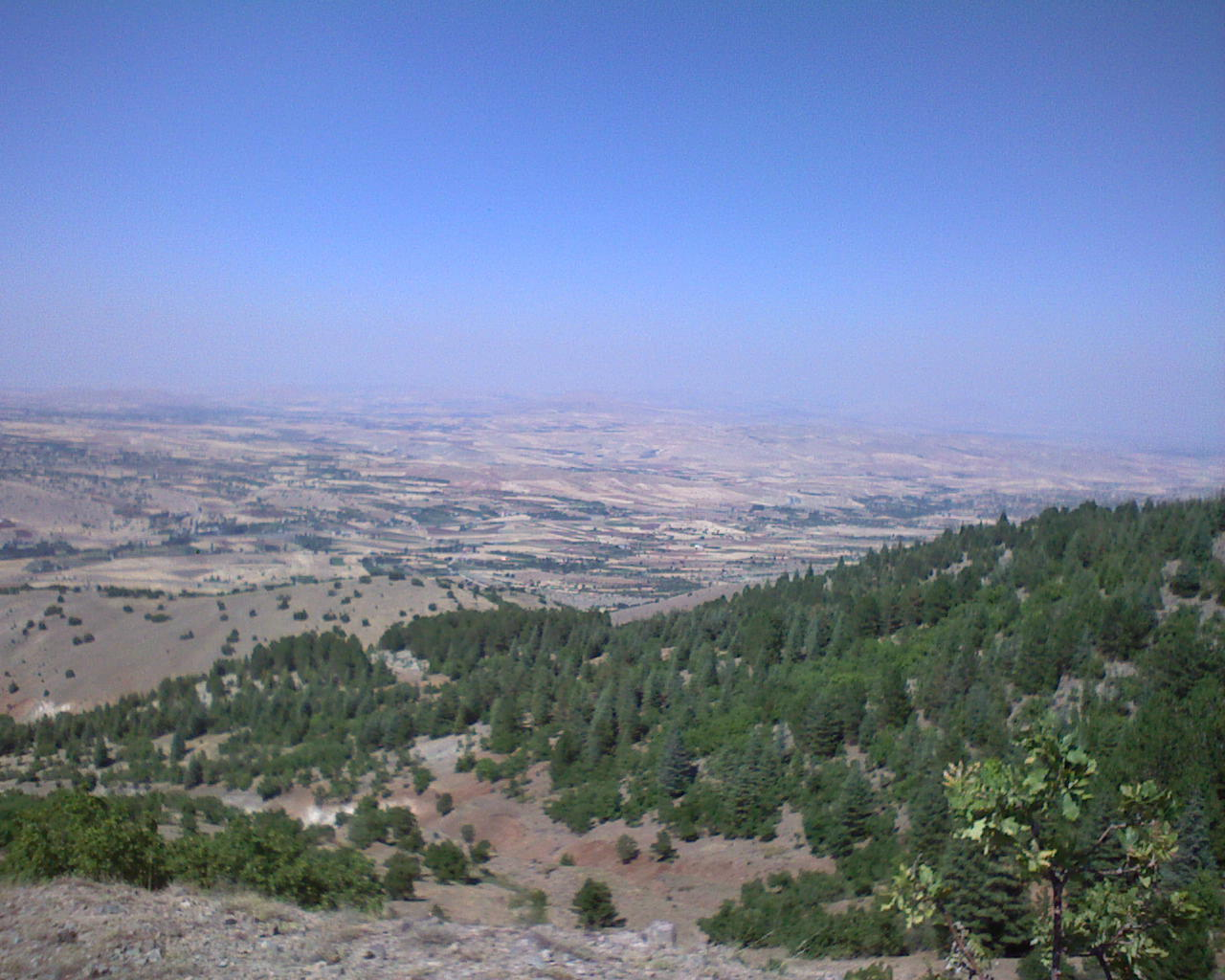
- Landscape near Küllük

- Location within Turkey
- Coordinates: 38°27′25″N 39°02′17″E
- Country: Turkey
- Province: Elazığ
- District: Elazığ
- Population (2021): 161
- Time zone: UTC+3 (TRT)

Küllük is a village of Elazığ District, Elazığ Province, in eastern Turkey. Its population is 161 (2021). The village is populated by Kurds of the Herdî tribe.

== Economy ==
The village economy is based on agriculture and animal husbandry. The village has electricity and telephone, and a drinking water network, but no sewerage network. The climate of the district is classed under the Köppen climate system as Csa Hot-summer Mediterranean climate.

The village post code is 23000.

== History ==
In 2007 an earthquake of magnitude 3.5 occurred on Sunday, February 25, 2007 centered on the town of Ortaçalı, just to the north, and Küllük was also impacted by the 2020 Elazığ earthquake.
