= Yürekli, Elazığ =

Village in Elazığ Province, Turkey

Yürekli
- Village
- Location in Turkey
- Coordinates: 38.640°N 38.957°E
- Country: Turkey
- Province: Elazığ
- District: Baskil
- Population (2021): 153
- Time zone: UTC+3 (TRT)

Yürekli is a village in the Elazığ District of Elazığ Province in Turkey. The village is populated by Kurds of the Zeyve tribe and had a population of 153 in 2021.
