= Acıpayam, Elazığ =

Village in Turkey

Acıpayam
- Village
- Location within Turkey
- Coordinates: 38°31′32″N 39°17′13″E
- Country: Turkey
- Province: Elazığ
- District: Elazığ
- Population (2021): 242
- Time zone: UTC+3 (TRT)

Acıpyam (formerly: Dadiş) is a village in Elazığ District. Elazığ Province, Turkey. Its distance to Elazığ is 18 km (11 mi). Its population is 242 (2021).
