= Ortaçalı, Elâzığ =

Village in Turkey

Ortaçalı
- Village
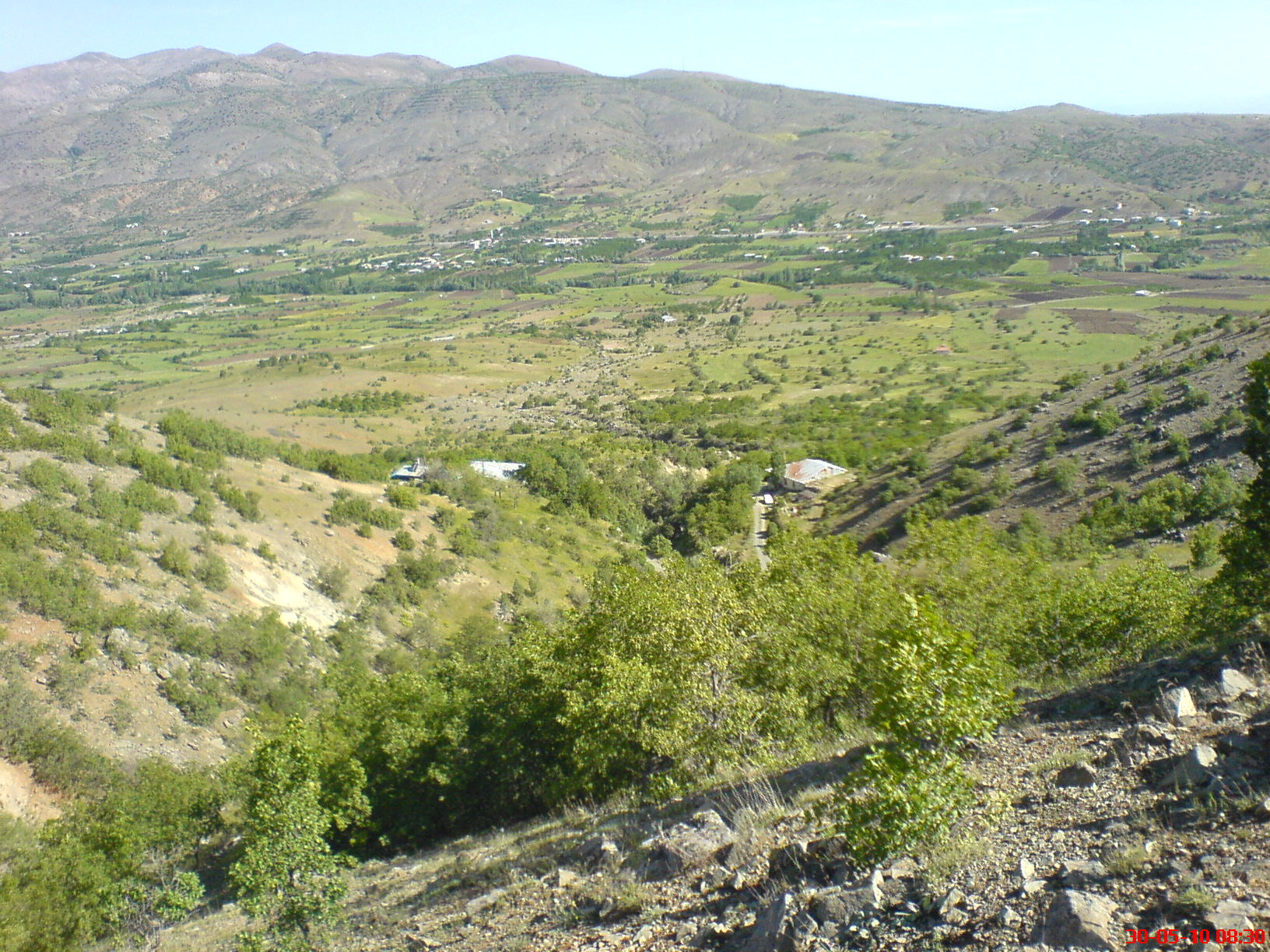
- The landscape around Ortaçalı

- Location within Turkey
- Coordinates: 38°27′50″N 39°01′54″E
- Country: Turkey
- Province: Elazığ
- District: Elazığ
- Population (2021): 176
- Time zone: UTC+3 (TRT)

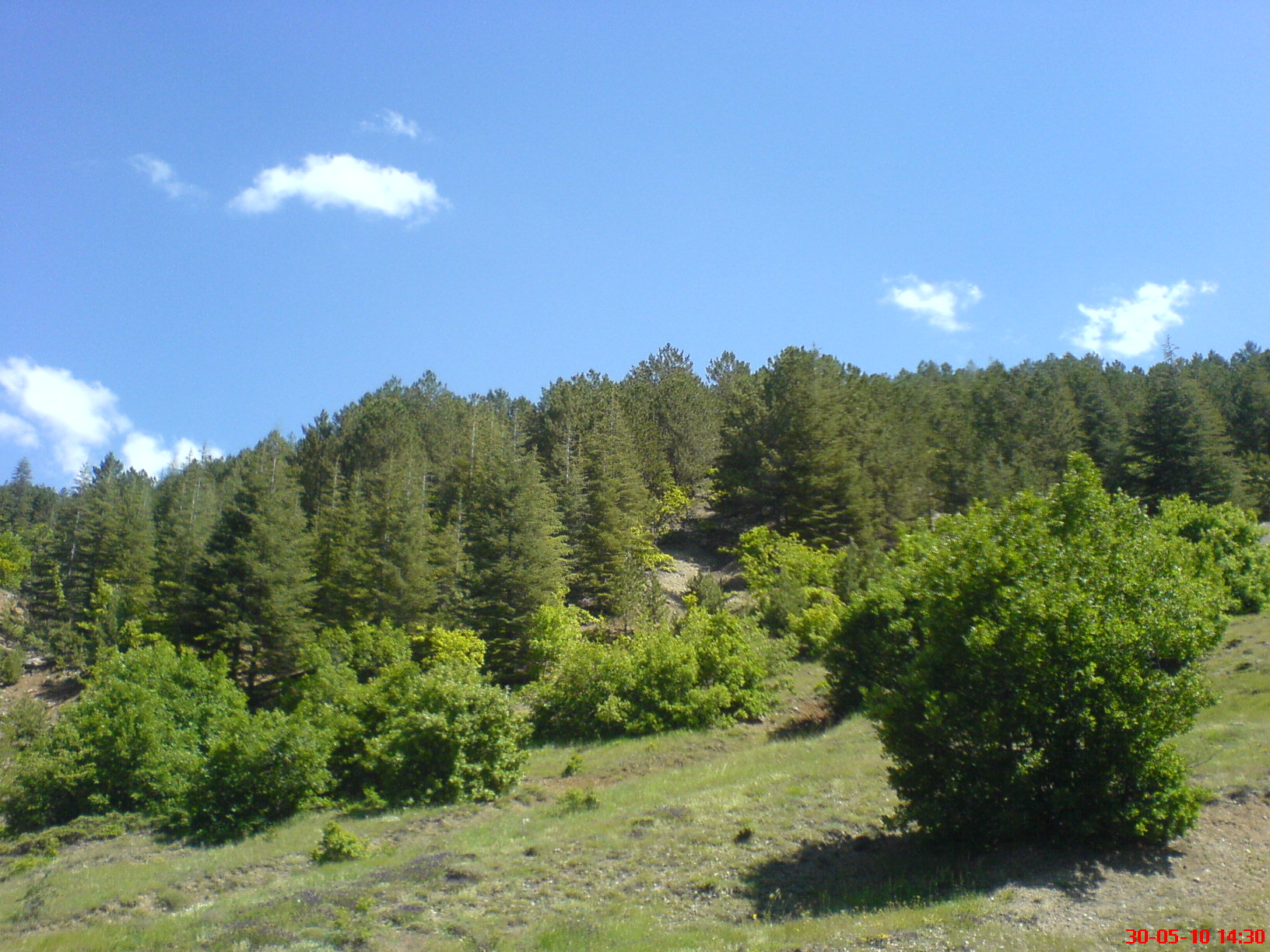
The landscape around Ortaçalı

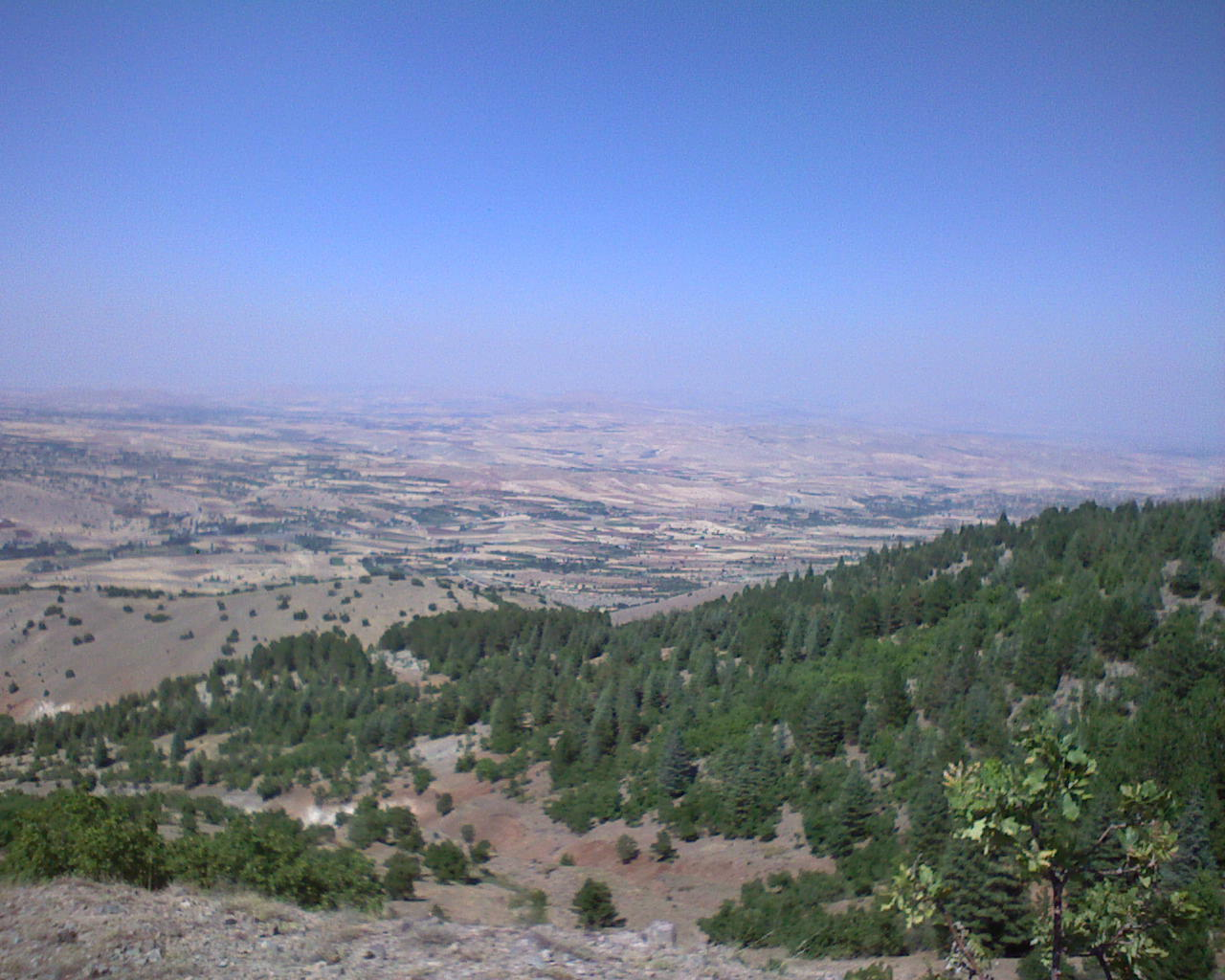
Landscape near Ortacali.

Ortaçalı is a village of Elazığ District in Elazığ Province eastern Turkey. Its population is 176 (2021). The village is populated by Kurds of the Parçikan tribe.

== Earthquakes ==
In 2007 an earthquake of magnitude 3.5 occurred on Sunday, February 25, 2007, centered on the town.

Ortaçalı was also strongly impacted by the 2020 Elazığ earthquake.
