= Yurtbaşı =

- Municipality
- Location within Turkey
- Coordinates: 38°38′N 39°21′E
- Country: Turkey
- Province: Elazığ
- District: Elazığ
- Elevation: 905 m (2,969 ft)
- Population (2021): 7,713
- Time zone: UTC+3 (TRT)
- Postal code: 23000
- Area code: 0424
- Climate: Csa

Yurtbaşı is a belde (town) in the central district (Elazığ District) of Elazığ Province, Turkey. It is situated to the west of Keban Dam reservoir at 38°38′N 39°21′E.The distance to Elazığ is 12 kilometres (7.5 mi). Its population is 7,713 (2021).
