= Mollakendi =

- Municipality
- Location in Turkey
- Coordinates: 38°34′38″N 39°19′58″E
- Country: Turkey
- Province: Elazığ
- District: Elazığ
- Population (2021): 2,214
- Time zone: UTC+3 (TRT)

Mollakendi is a town (belde) in Elazığ District, Elazığ Province, Turkey. Its population is 2,214 (2021).
