= Akçakiraz, Elazığ =

Akçakiraz
- Municipality
- Location within Turkey
- Coordinates: 38°37′N 39°16′E
- Country: Turkey
- Province: Elazığ
- District: Elazığ
- Elevation: 920 m (3,020 ft)
- Population (2021): 8,047
- Time zone: UTC+3 (TRT)
- Postal code: 23180
- Area code: 0424
- Climate: Csa

Akçakiraz (former Perçenç, from the original Armenian Parchanj [Armenian: Բարջանճ]) is a belde (town) in the central district (Elazığ District) of Elazığ Province, Turkey. Situated 7 kilometres (4.3 mi) south of Elazığ and near the junction of two Turkish state highways D.300 and D.885 which connect Elazığ to Bingöl and Diyarbakır respectively. Its population is 8,047 (2021).

It consists of 10 quarters: Paşalar, Kıraç, Yenice, Hürriyet, Kültür, Yeşilyurt, Yüzbaşı, Yeşilkuşak, Zafer and Bahçekapı.

== History ==
According to the official municipality page the town was founded in 1670 by a certain İsmail Bey who was probably a member of Karakoyunlu dynasty (which had founded a short lived Turkmen empire in the 14th and 15th centuries). Local Armenian tradition held that the town was founded by the Apostles Thaddeus and Bartholomew, patron saints of the Armenian Church. While the author of a study on the village finds this story to be apocryphal, he believes Armenians were the original founders of the village. All the Armenians were expelled or massacred during the course of the Armenian genocide of 1915.
