= Bükardı =

- Municipality
- Location in Turkey
- Coordinates: 38°28′07″N 40°10′17″E
- Country: Turkey
- Province: Elazığ
- District: Arıcak
- Population (2021): 1,957
- Time zone: UTC+3 (TRT)

Bükardı is a town (belde) in Arıcak District, Elazığ Province, Turkey. Its population is 1,957 (2021).
