= Üçocak =

- Municipality
- Location in Turkey
- Coordinates: 38°28′38″N 40°14′41″E
- Country: Turkey
- Province: Elazığ
- District: Arıcak
- Population (2021): 2,474
- Time zone: UTC+3 (TRT)

Üçocak is a town (belde) in Arıcak District, Elazığ Province, Turkey. Its population is 2,474 (2021).
