= Akcakale castle =

Coordinates: 41.0787°N 39.5032°E

Akcakale castle is a Byzantine fortress in Akcakale (the previous name was Kordyle) at Akçaabat, Turkey, lying 18 km (11 mi) west of Trabzon. Built on a terrace facing the sea the fortress is believed to have been built by emperor Alexios II of Trebizond (1297–1330) for protection against the Seljuk attacks. The fortress was defended for another seven years after the conquest of Trabzon, until it was taken over by Mahmud Pasha Angelović in 1468, one of the commanders of Mehmed II.
