= Akçakale, Elazığ =

Village in Turkey

Akçakale
- Village
- Location in Turkey
- Coordinates: 38.5080°N 38.9968°E
- Country: Turkey
- Province: Elazığ
- District: Elazığ
- Population (2021): 115
- Time zone: UTC+3 (TRT)

Akçakale is a village in the Elazığ District of Elazığ Province in Turkey. Its population is 115 (2021). The village is populated by Kurds of the Parçikan tribe.
