= Yalnız, Elazığ =

Village in Turkey

Yalnız
- Village
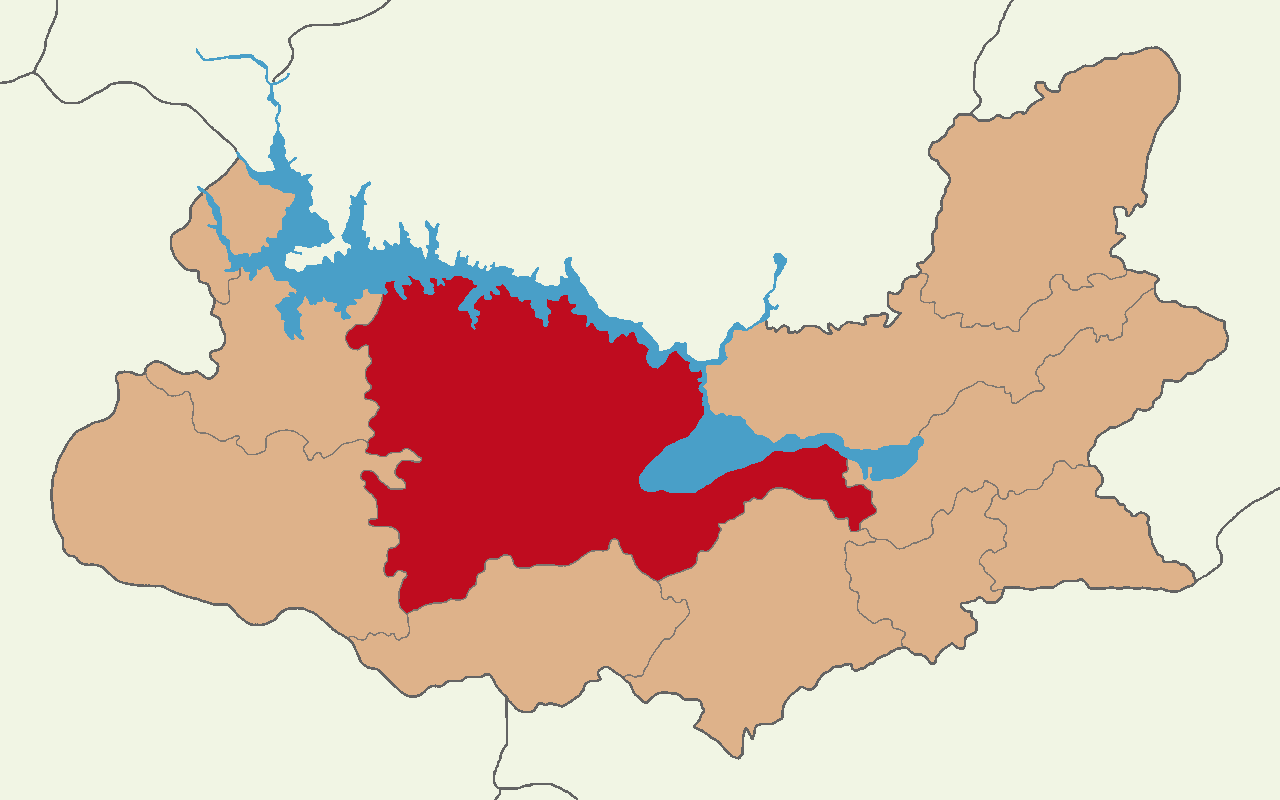
- Map

- Location within Turkey
- Coordinates: 38.601°N 39.184°E
- Country: Turkey
- Province: Elazığ
- District: Elazığ
- Population (2021): 158
- Time zone: UTC+3 (TRT)

Yalnız is a village in the Elazığ District of Elazığ Province in Turkey. Its population is 158 (2021).
