= Erimli =

- Municipality
- Location in Turkey
- Coordinates: 38°31′22″N 40°01′03″E
- Country: Turkey
- Province: Elazığ
- District: Arıcak
- Population (2021): 2,515
- Time zone: UTC+3 (TRT)

Erimli is a town (belde) in Arıcak District, Elazığ Province, Turkey. Its population is 2,515 (2021).
