= Yazıkonak, Elazığ =

Yazıkonak Vertetil
- Municipality
- Location within Turkey
- Coordinates: 38°37′N 39°18′E
- Country: Turkey
- Province: Elazığ
- District: Elazığ
- Elevation: 885 m (2,904 ft)
- Population (2021): 9,606
- Time zone: UTC+3 (TRT)
- Postal code: 23180
- Area code: 0424
- Climate: Dsa

Yazıkonak, formerly known as Vertetil (Armenian: Վարդաթիլ, romanized: Vardat'il, lit. 'rosehip') is a town (belde) in the central district (Elazığ District) of Elazığ Province, Turkey. It is situated to the west of Keban Dam reservoir. The distance to Elazığ is 10 kilometres (6.2 mi). Its population is 9,606 (2021). The town is a relatively new settlement. Elazığ Airport which is just at the southwest of Yazıkonak contributed to the rapid increase in population. In 1986, it was declared a seat of township. Agriculture, cattle rising and light industries are among the economic activities of the town.
