= Arıcak District =

- District
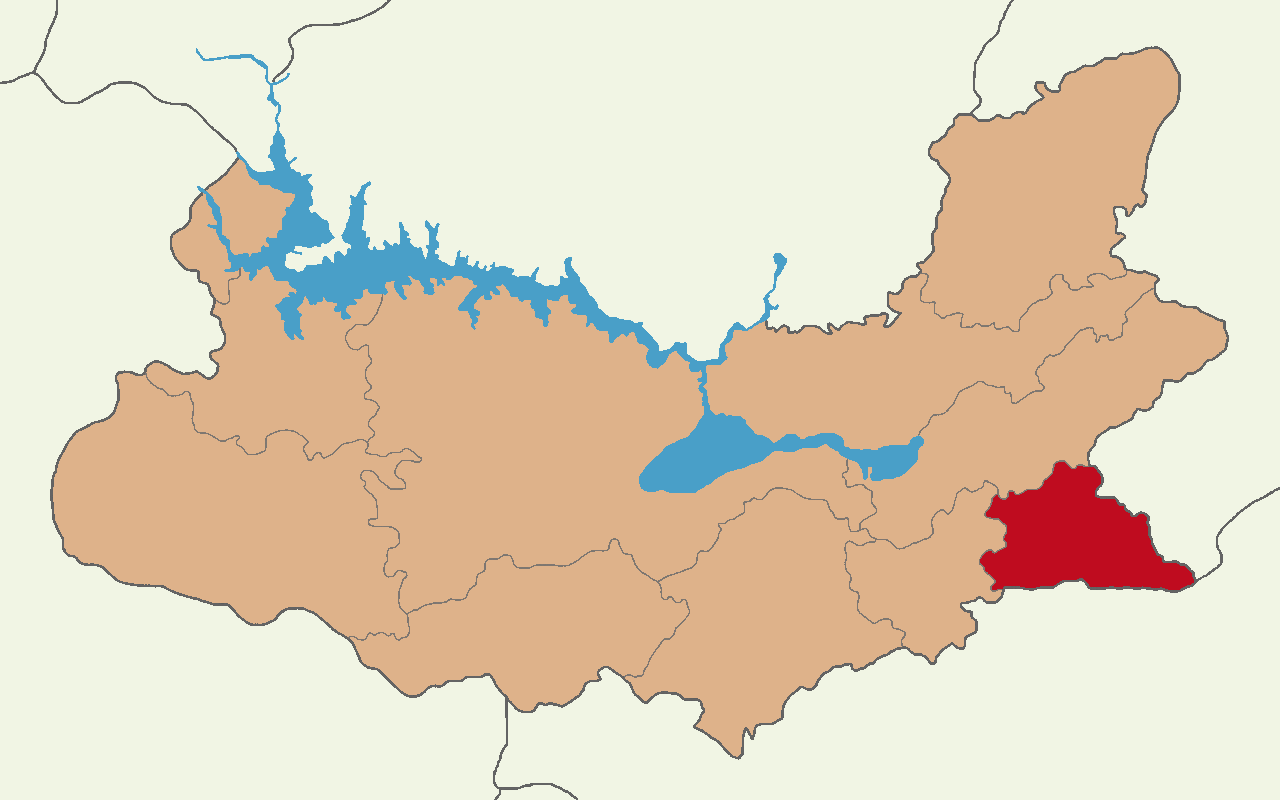
- Map showing Arıcak District in Elazığ Province

- Location in Turkey
- Coordinates: 38°34′N 40°08′E
- Country: Turkey
- Province: Elazığ
- Seat: Arıcak

Government
  - Kaymakam: Mesut Çoban
- Area: 354 km^{2} (137 sq mi)
- Population (2021): 13,732
  - Density: 39/km^{2} (100/sq mi)
- Time zone: UTC+3 (TRT)

Arıcak District is a district of Elazığ Province of Turkey. Its seat is the town Arıcak. Its area is 354 km^{2}, and its population is 13,732 (2021). The district was established in 1987.

== Composition ==
There are 4 municipalities in Arıcak District:

- Arıcak
- Bükardı
- Erimli
- Üçocak

There are 10 villages in Arıcak District:

- Bozçavuş
- Çavuşdere
- Çevrecik
- Erbağı
- Göründü
- Kambertepe
- Karakaş
- Küplüce
- Ormanpınar
- Yoğunbilek
