= Sancaklı, Elâzığ =

Village in Turkey

Sancaklı
- Village
- Location within Turkey
- Coordinates: 38.585°N 38.921°E
- Country: Turkey
- Province: Elazığ
- District: Elazığ
- Population (2021): 93
- Time zone: UTC+3 (TRT)

Sancaklı is a village in the Elazığ District of Elazığ Province in Turkey. Its population is 93 (2021). The village is populated by Kurds of Herdî tribe.
