= Hankendi, Elazığ =

Hankendi
- Village
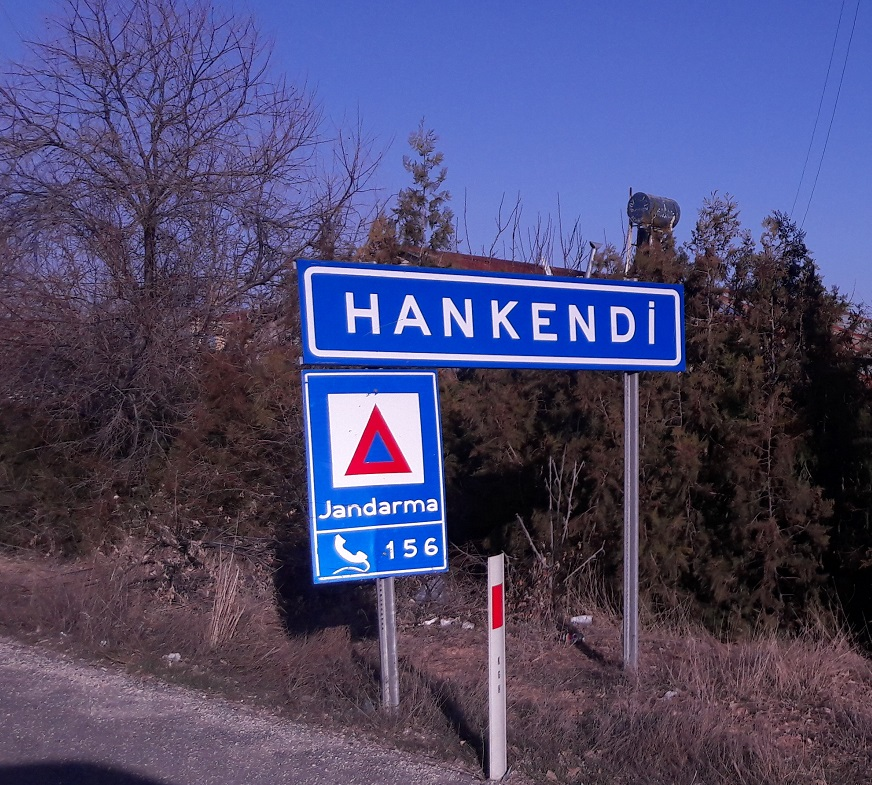

- Location within Turkey
- Coordinates: 38°34′26″N 39°3′33″E
- Country: Turkey
- Province: Elazığ
- District: Elazığ
- Elevation: 1,140 m (3,740 ft)
- Population (2021): 886
- Time zone: UTC+3 (TRT)
- Postal code: 23130
- Area code: 0424

Hankendi is a village in the central district (Elazığ District) of Elazığ Province, Turkey. It is situated on the Turkish state highway D.300 which connects Elazığ to Malatya. The distance to Elazığ is 18 kilometres (11 mi). Its population is 886 (2021). During the Byzantine Empire, the town was a part of Anzitene region Later it became a part of Seljuks of Rum and Ottoman Empire. Ruins of the Bağdat street (Turkish: Bağdar caddesi) which was constructed during the campaign of Murat IV in 1638 is in the vicinity of the settlement. Before the 2013 reorganisation, it was a town (belde).
