= Arıcak =

- Municipality
- Location within Turkey
- Coordinates: 38°33′52″N 40°08′02″E
- Country: Turkey
- Province: Elazığ
- District: Arıcak

Government
  - Mayor: Yılmaz Yalçınkaya (AKP)
- Population (2021): 3,194
- Time zone: UTC+3 (TRT)
- Postal code: 23510
- Climate: Csa
- Website: www.aricak.bel.tr

Arıcak (Kurdish: Mîrvan), is a town of Elazığ Province of Turkey. It is the seat of Arıcak District. Its population is 3,194 (2021). The mayor is Yılmaz Yalçınkaya (Ak Parti).
