= Elazığ District =

- District
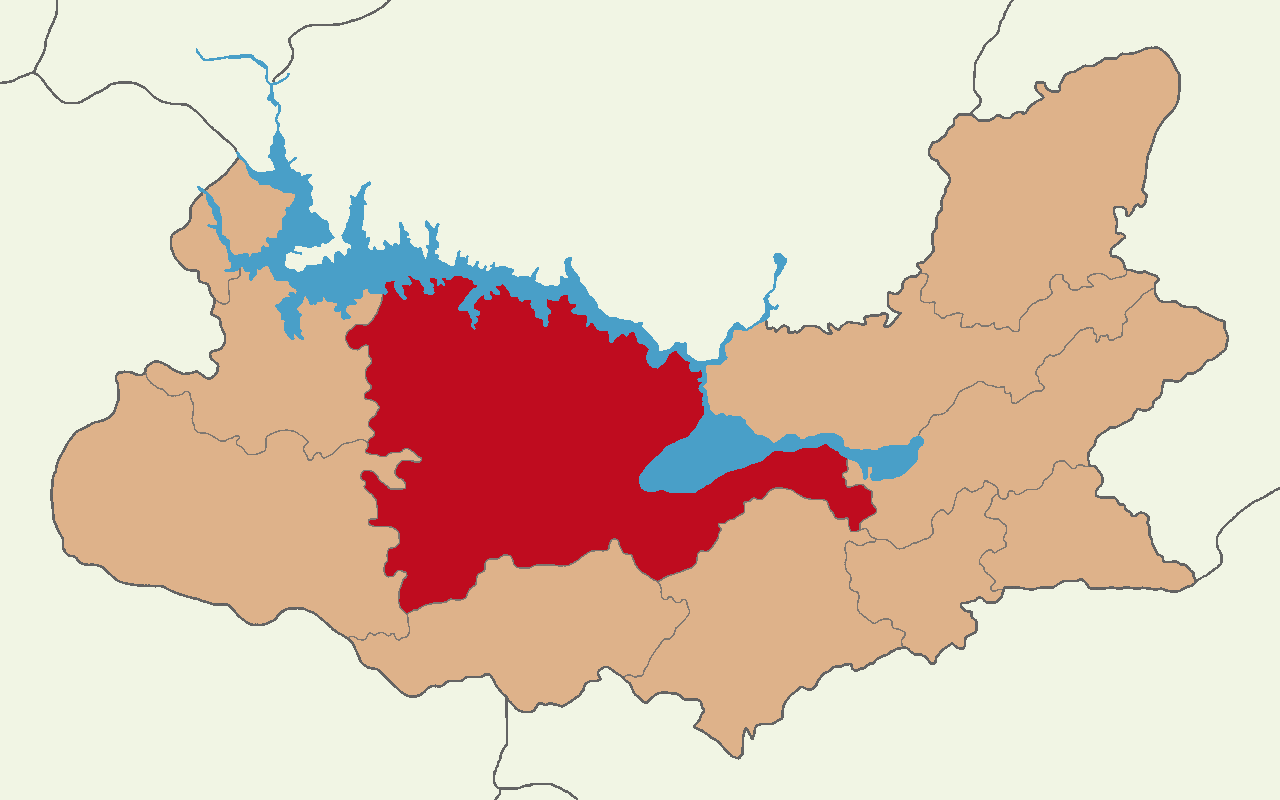
- Map showing Elazığ District in Elazığ Province

- Location in Turkey
- Coordinates: 38°40′N 39°13′E
- Country: Turkey
- Province: Elazığ
- Seat: Elazığ
- Area: 2,243 km^{2} (866 sq mi)
- Population (2021): 443,363
  - Density: 200/km^{2} (510/sq mi)
- Time zone: UTC+3 (TRT)

Elazığ District (also: Merkez, meaning "central") is a district of Elazığ Province of Turkey. Its seat is the city Elazığ. Its area is 2,243 km^{2}, and its population is 443,363 (2021).

== Composition ==
There are 5 municipalities in Elazığ District:

- Akçakiraz
- Elazığ
- Mollakendi
- Yazıkonak
- Yurtbaşı

There are 134 villages in Elazığ District:

- Acıpayam
- Akçakale
- Alaca
- Alatarla
- Alpağut
- Altınkuşak
- Arındık
- Aşağıdemirtaş
- Avcılı
- Aydıncık
- Aydınlar
- Badempınarı
- Bağdere
- Bağlarca
- Balıbey
- Ballıca
- Balpınar
- Beşikköy
- Beşoluk
- Beydalı
- Beydoğmuş
- Bölüklü
- Bulutlu
- Cevizdere
- Cipköy
- Çağlar
- Çalıca
- Çatalharman
- Çöteli
- Dallıca
- Dambüyük
- Dedepınarı
- Değirmenönü
- Dereboğazı
- Doğankuş
- Durupınar
- Elmapınarı
- Erbildi
- Esenkent
- Fatmalı
- Gedikyolu
- Gökçe
- Gölardı
- Gölköy
- Gözebaşı
- Gözpınar
- Gülpınar
- Gümüşbağlar
- Günaçtı
- Günbağı
- Güneyçayırı
- Güzelyalı
- Hal
- Hankendi
- Harmantepe
- Hıdırbaba
- Hoşköy
- Işıkyolu
- İçme
- İkitepe
- Kalkantepe
- Kaplıkaya
- Karaali
- Karaçavuş
- Karasaz
- Karataş
- Kavakpınar
- Kavaktepe
- Kelmahmut
- Kepektaş
- Kıraçköy
- Koçharmanı
- Koçkale
- Konakalmaz
- Koparuşağı
- Korucu
- Koruköy
- Kozluk
- Körpe
- Kumla
- Kurtdere
- Kuşhane
- Kuşluyazı
- Kuyulu
- Küllük
- Meşeli
- Muratçık
- Nuralı
- Obuz
- Ortaçalı
- Oymaağaç
- Öksüzuşağı
- Örençay
- Pelteköy
- Pirinççi
- Poyraz
- Sakabaşı
- Salkaya
- Sancaklı
- Sarıbük
- Sarıçubuk
- Sarıgül
- Sarıkamış
- Sarılı
- Sarıyakup
- Sedeftepe
- Serince
- Sinanköy
- Sultanuşağı
- Sünköy
- Sütlüce
- Şabanlı
- Şahaplı
- Şehsuvar
- Şeyhhacı
- Tadım
- Temürköy
- Tepeköy
- Tohumlu
- Uzuntarla
- Üçağaç
- Ürünveren
- Yalındamlar
- Yalnız
- Yazıpınarı
- Yedigöze
- Yenikapı
- Yenikonak
- Yolçatı
- Yolüstü
- Yukarıçakmak
- Yukarıdemirtaş
- Yünlüce
- Yürekli
