= Bash Qeshlaq =

Bash Qeshlaq or Bash Qishlaq or Bashqeshlaq (Persian: باش قشلاق), also rendered as Bashkishlak, may refer to:

- Bash Qeshlaq, Kurdistan
- Bash Qeshlaq, Zanjan
- Bash Qeshlaq, alternate name of Mesgar, Zanjan Province
