= Gunai =

Gunai may refer to:

- Gunai people, an ethnic group of Australia
- Gunai language, an Australian language
- Gunai, Iran, a village

== See also ==
- Gunay (disambiguation)
