= Tazeh Qeshlaq =

Tazeh Qeshlaq (Persian: تازه قشلاق) may refer to:

- Tazeh Qeshlaq, Ardabil
- Tazeh Qeshlaq, Zanjan
- Tazeh Qeshlaq, alternate name of Vakil Qeshlaq, Zanjan Province
