= Choqluy =

Choqluy (Persian: چقلوي), also rendered as Chaghalu or Chaghlooy or Choqlu or Chuqlu or Jaghalu may refer to:

- Choqluy-e Olya
- Choqluy-e Sofla
