= Gunay =

Gunay may refer to:

- Gunay, Iran, a village in Iran
- Günay, a Turkish name (including a list of people with the name)
- Günay, Sivrice, a village in Turkey
