= Towhidlu =

Towhidlu (Persian: توحيدلو) may refer to:

- Towhidlu, Markazi
- Towhidlu, Zanjan
