= Mohammadlu =

Mohammadlu (Persian: محمدلو) may refer to:

- Mohammadlu, Ardabil
- Mohammadlu, Zanjan
- Mohammadlu, alternate name of Mohammad Shahlu, Zanjan Province
