= Khalifeh Qeshlaq =

Village in Zanjan province, Iran

Khalifeh Qeshlaq Persian: خليفه قشلاق
- Village
- Location within Iran
- Coordinates: 35°45′38″N 48°15′24″E
- Country: Iran
- Province: Zanjan
- County: Khodabandeh
- District: Afshar
- Rural District: Shivanat

Population (2016)
  - Total: 320
- Time zone: UTC+3:30 (IRST)

Khalifeh Qeshlaq (Persian: خليفه قشلاق) (Note: Also romanized as Khalīfeh Qeshlāq, and Khalīfeh-ye Qeshlāq; also known as Khalfak Qishlāq and Khalifeh Gheshlagh) is a village in Shivanat Rural District of Afshar District in Khodabandeh County, Zanjan province, Iran.

== Demographics ==
=== Population ===
At the time of the 2006 National Census, the village's population was 334 in 67 households. The following census in 2011 counted 342 people in 86 households. The 2016 census measured the population of the village as 320 people in 85 households.
