= Varmanlu =

Village in Zanjan province, Iran

Varmanlu Persian: ورمانلو
- Village
- Location within Iran
- Coordinates: 36°00′10″N 48°04′06″E
- Country: Iran
- Province: Zanjan
- County: Khodabandeh
- District: Afshar
- Rural District: Qeshlaqat-e Afshar

Population (2016)
  - Total: Below reporting threshold
- Time zone: UTC+3:30 (IRST)

Varmanlu (Persian: ورمانلو) (Note: Also romanized as Varmānlū) is a village in Qeshlaqat-e Afshar Rural District of Afshar District of Khodabandeh County, Zanjan province, Iran.

== Demographics ==
=== Population ===
At the time of the 2006 National Census, the village's population was 21 in six households. The following census in 2011 counted 16 people in four households. The 2016 census measured the population of the village as below the reporting threshold.
