= Mahdilu =

Village in Zanjan province, Iran

Mahdilu Persian: مهديلو
- Village
- Location within Iran
- Coordinates: 36°00′19″N 48°14′22″E
- Country: Iran
- Province: Zanjan
- County: Khodabandeh
- District: Afshar
- Rural District: Qeshlaqat-e Afshar

Population (2016)
  - Total: 20
- Time zone: UTC+3:30 (IRST)

Mahdilu (Persian: مهديلو) is a village in Qeshlaqat-e Afshar Rural District of Afshar District of Khodabandeh County, Zanjan province, Iran.

== Demographics ==
=== Population ===
At the time of the 2006 and 2011 National Censuses, the village's population was below the reporting threshold. The 2016 census measured the population of the village as 20 people in six households.
