= Mesrabad, Zanjan =

Village in Zanjan province, Iran

Mesrabad Persian: مصراباد
- Village
- Location within Iran
- Coordinates: 35°52′08″N 48°09′51″E
- Country: Iran
- Province: Zanjan
- County: Khodabandeh
- District: Afshar
- Rural District: Shivanat

Population (2016)
  - Total: 342
- Time zone: UTC+3:30 (IRST)

Mesrabad (Persian: مصراباد) (Note: Also romanized as Meşrābād; also known as Misrābād) is a village in Shivanat Rural District of Afshar District in Khodabandeh County, Zanjan province, Iran.

== Demographics ==
=== Population ===
At the time of the 2006 National Census, the village's population was 499 in 100 households. The following census in 2011 counted 448 people in 120 households. The 2016 census measured the population of the village as 342 people in 88 households.
