= Tatardeh =

Village in Zanjan province, Iran

Tatardeh Persian: تاتارده
- Village
- Location within Iran
- Coordinates: 35°57′19″N 48°06′20″E
- Country: Iran
- Province: Zanjan
- County: Khodabandeh
- District: Afshar
- Rural District: Shivanat

Population (2016)
  - Total: 169
- Time zone: UTC+3:30 (IRST)

Tatardeh (Persian: تاتارده) (Note: Also romanized as Tātārdeh) is a village in Shivanat Rural District of Afshar District in Khodabandeh County, Zanjan province, Iran.

== Demographics ==
=== Population ===
At the time of the 2006 National Census, the village's population was 302 in 67 households. The following census in 2011 counted 261 people in 72 households. The 2016 census measured the population of the village as 169 people in 40 households.
