= Baghlujeh, Zanjan =

Village in Zanjan province, Iran

Baghlujeh Persian: باغلوجه
- Village
- Location within Iran
- Coordinates: 36°04′42″N 48°06′31″E
- Country: Iran
- Province: Zanjan
- County: Khodabandeh
- District: Afshar
- Rural District: Qeshlaqat-e Afshar

Population (2016)
  - Total: 88
- Time zone: UTC+3:30 (IRST)

Baghlujeh (Persian: باغلوجه) (Note: Also romanized as Bāghlūjeh) is a village in Qeshlaqat-e Afshar Rural District of Afshar District of Khodabandeh County, Zanjan province, Iran.

== Demographics ==
=== Population ===
At the time of the 2006 National Census, the village's population was 125 in 25 households. The following census in 2011 counted 94 people in 28 households. The 2016 census measured the population of the village as 88 people in 30 households.
