= Akseki, Sivrice =

Village in Elazığ Province, Turkey

Akseki
- Village
- Location in Turkey
- Coordinates: 38.355°N 39.115°E
- Country: Turkey
- Province: Elazığ
- District: Sivrice
- Population (2021): 37
- Time zone: UTC+3 (TRT)

Akseki is a village in the Sivrice District of Elazığ Province in Turkey. The village is populated by Kurds and Muhacir Turks and had a population of 37 in 2021.

The hamlets of Doğanlar and Sarıyer are attached to the village.
