= Yengiabad, Zanjan =

Village in Zanjan province, Iran

Yengiabad Persian: ینگی‌آباد
- Village
- Location within Iran
- Coordinates: 35°53′23″N 48°03′22″E
- Country: Iran
- Province: Zanjan
- County: Khodabandeh
- District: Afshar
- Rural District: Shivanat

Population (2016)
  - Total: 83
- Time zone: UTC+3:30 (IRST)

Yengiabad (Persian: ینگی‌آباد) (Note: Also romanized as Yengīābād; also known as Yengābād) is a village in Shivanat Rural District of Afshar District in Khodabandeh County, Zanjan province, Iran.

== Demographics ==
=== Population ===
At the time of the 2006 National Census, the village's population was 117 in 26 households. The following census in 2011 counted 101 people in 29 households. The 2016 census measured the population of the village as 83 people in 24 households.
