= Qui, Iran =

Village in Zanjan province, Iran

Qui Persian: قوئي
- Village
- Location within Iran
- Coordinates: 35°53′45″N 48°16′42″E
- Country: Iran
- Province: Zanjan
- County: Khodabandeh
- District: Afshar
- Rural District: Shivanat

Population (2016)
  - Total: 793
- Time zone: UTC+3:30 (IRST)

Qui (Persian: قوئي) (Note: Also romanized as Qū’ī; also known as Ghoo’i and Qūyu) is a village in Shivanat Rural District of Afshar District in Khodabandeh County, Zanjan province, Iran.

== Demographics ==
=== Population ===
At the time of the 2006 National Census, the village's population was 949 in 177 households. The following census in 2011 counted 919 people in 233 households. The 2016 census measured the population of the village as 793 people in 190 households. It was the most populous village in its rural district.
