= Kamlar =

Kamlar or Kam Lar or Kamalar or Kemlar or Komlar (Persian: كملر) may refer to:

- Kamlar, Golestan
- Kam Lar, Zanjan
