= Jomehlu =

Village in Zanjan province, Iran

Jomehlu Persian: جمعه لو
- Village
- Location within Iran
- Coordinates: 36°03′34″N 48°10′51″E
- Country: Iran
- Province: Zanjan
- County: Khodabandeh
- District: Afshar
- Rural District: Qeshlaqat-e Afshar

Population (2016)
  - Total: 57
- Time zone: UTC+3:30 (IRST)

Jomehlu (Persian: جمعه لو) (Note: Also romanized as Jom‘ehlū; also known as Dzhamlu and Jum‘alu) is a village in Qeshlaqat-e Afshar Rural District of Afshar District of Khodabandeh County, Zanjan province, Iran.

== Demographics ==
=== Population ===
At the time of the 2006 National Census, the village's population was 117 in 24 households. The following census in 2011 counted 75 people in 17 households. The 2016 census measured the population of the village as 57 people in 14 households.
