= Akbugdaý =

Akbugday can refer to:

- Akbugdaý, Turkmenistan
- Ak bugdaý District
- Akbuğday, Sivrice
