= Aqa Choqlu =

Village in Zanjan province, Iran

Aqa Choqlu Persian: اقاچقلو
- Village
- Location within Iran
- Coordinates: 36°06′54″N 48°00′19″E
- Country: Iran
- Province: Zanjan
- County: Khodabandeh
- District: Afshar
- Rural District: Qeshlaqat-e Afshar

Population (2016)
  - Total: 117
- Time zone: UTC+3:30 (IRST)

Aqa Choqlu (Persian: اقاچقلو) (Note: Also romanized as Āqā Choqlū; also known as Āq Joqlū and Āqā Joghlū) is a village in Qeshlaqat-e Afshar Rural District of Afshar District of Khodabandeh County, Zanjan province, Iran.

== Demographics ==
=== Population ===
At the time of the 2006 National Census, the village's population was 209 in 44 households. The following census in 2011 counted 131 people in 35 households. The 2016 census measured the population of the village as 117 people in 134 households.
