= Kamışlık, Sivrice =

Village in Elazığ Province, Turkey

Kamışlık
- Village
- Location in Turkey
- Coordinates: 38.423°N 39.108°E
- Country: Turkey
- Province: Elazığ
- District: Sivrice
- Population (2021): 116
- Time zone: UTC+3 (TRT)

Kamışlık (Kurdish: Kejan) is a village in the Sivrice District of Elazığ Province in Turkey. The village is populated by Kurds of the Kejan tribe and by Muhacir Turks and had a population of 116 in 2021.

The hamlets of Akarsu, Cami, Damlacık, Evyapan, Yağıztaş, Yiğitbaşı and Yüceler are attached to the village.
