= Gandab, Zanjan =

Village in Zanjan province, Iran

Gandab Persian: گنداب
- Village
- Location within Iran
- Coordinates: 35°59′55″N 48°01′29″E
- Country: Iran
- Province: Zanjan
- County: Khodabandeh
- District: Afshar
- Rural District: Qeshlaqat-e Afshar

Population (2016)
  - Total: 105
- Time zone: UTC+3:30 (IRST)

Gandab (Persian: گنداب) (Note: Also romanized as Gandāb) is a village in Qeshlaqat-e Afshar Rural District of Afshar District of Khodabandeh County, Zanjan province, Iran.

== Demographics ==
=== Population ===
At the time of the 2006 National Census, the village's population was 260 in 45 households. The following census in 2011 counted 173 people in 38 households. The 2016 census measured the population of the village as 105 people in 25 households.
