= Khalifehlu, Khodabandeh =

Village in Zanjan province, Iran

Khalifehlu Persian: خليفه لو
- Village
- Location within Iran
- Coordinates: 35°59′42″N 47°59′36″E
- Country: Iran
- Province: Zanjan
- County: Khodabandeh
- District: Afshar
- Rural District: Qeshlaqat-e Afshar

Population (2016)
  - Total: 97
- Time zone: UTC+3:30 (IRST)

Khalifehlu (Persian: خليفه لو) (Note: Also romanized as Khalīfehlū; also known as Khalīfeh) is a village in Qeshlaqat-e Afshar Rural District of Afshar District of Khodabandeh County, Zanjan province, Iran.

== Demographics ==
=== Population ===
At the time of the 2006 National Census, the village's population was 189 in 38 households. The following census in 2011 counted 128 people in 37 households. The 2016 census measured the population of the village as 97 people in 25 households.
