= Afsharlu =

Village in Zanjan province, Iran

Afsharlu Persian: افشارلو
- Village
- Location within Iran
- Coordinates: 35°58′14″N 48°18′03″E
- Country: Iran
- Province: Zanjan
- County: Khodabandeh
- District: Afshar
- Rural District: Qeshlaqat-e Afshar

Population (2016)
  - Total: Below reporting threshold
- Time zone: UTC+3:30 (IRST)

Afsharlu (Persian: افشارلو) (Note: Also romanized as Afshār Loo and Afshārlū; also known as Afshār and Aūshārle) is a village in Qeshlaqat-e Afshar Rural District of Afshar District of Khodabandeh County, Zanjan province, Iran.

== Demographics ==
=== Population ===
At the time of the 2006 National Census, the village's population was 33 in seven households. The following census in 2011 counted 11 people in four households. The 2016 census measured the population of the village as below the reporting threshold.
