= Fereydun, Zanjan =

Village in Zanjan province, Iran

Fereydun Persian: فريدون
- Village
- Location within Iran
- Coordinates: 35°54′37″N 48°04′32″E
- Country: Iran
- Province: Zanjan
- County: Khodabandeh
- District: Afshar
- Rural District: Shivanat

Population (2016)
  - Total: 172
- Time zone: UTC+3:30 (IRST)

Fereydun (Persian: فريدون) (Note: Also romanized as Farīdūn, Fereidoon, and Fereydūn) is a village in the Shivanat Rural District of Afshar District in Khodabandeh County, Zanjan province, Iran.

== Demographics ==
=== Population ===
At the time of the 2006 National Census, the village's population was 348 in 86 households. The following census in 2011 counted 268 people in 86 households. The 2016 census measured the population of the village as 172 people in 58 households.
