= Uslu, Sivrice =

Village in Elazığ Province, Turkey

Uslu
- Village
- Location in Turkey
- Coordinates: 38.368°N 39.156°E
- Country: Turkey
- Province: Elazığ
- District: Sivrice
- Population (2021): 103
- Time zone: UTC+3 (TRT)

Uslu is a village in the Sivrice District of Elazığ Province in Turkey. The village is populated by Kurds and Muhacir Turks and had a population of 103 in 2021.

The hamlet of Yenice is attached to the village.
