= Görgülü =

Görgülü is a Turkish surname. Notable people with the surname include:

- Ferhat Görgülü (born 1991), Dutch footballer of Turkish descent
- Sercan Görgülü (born 1960), Turkish footballer

== See also ==
- Görgülü, Sivrice
