= Qamcheqay, Khodabandeh =

Village in Zanjan province, Iran

Qamcheqay Persian: قمچقاي
- Village
- Location within Iran
- Coordinates: 35°48′40″N 48°09′55″E
- Country: Iran
- Province: Zanjan
- County: Khodabandeh
- District: Afshar
- Rural District: Shivanat

Population (2016)
  - Total: 365
- Time zone: UTC+3:30 (IRST)

Qamcheqay (Persian: قمچقاي) (Note: Also romanized as Qamcheqā’ī and Qamcheqāy; also known as Ghamchaghay, Kabajgāi, and Qamchāy) is a village in Shivanat Rural District of Afshar District in Khodabandeh County, Zanjan province, Iran.

== Demographics ==
=== Population ===
At the time of the 2006 National Census, the village's population was 404 in 80 households. The following census in 2011 counted 401 people in 112 households. The 2016 census measured the population of the village as 365 people in 97 households.
