= Yuz Bashi =

Village in Zanjan province, Iran

Yuz Bashi Persian: يوزباشي
- Village
- Location within Iran
- Coordinates: 35°55′28″N 48°16′05″E
- Country: Iran
- Province: Zanjan
- County: Khodabandeh
- District: Afshar
- Rural District: Shivanat

Population (2016)
  - Total: 40
- Time zone: UTC+3:30 (IRST)

Yuz Bashi (Persian: يوزباشي) (Note: Also romanized as Yūz Bāshī; also known as Yoozbash Cha’i and Yūzmāshe) is a village in Shivanat Rural District of Afshar District in Khodabandeh County, Zanjan province, Iran.

== Demographics ==
=== Population ===
At the time of the 2006 National Census, the village's population was 85 in 19 households. The following census in 2011 counted 57 people in 15 households. The 2016 census measured the population of the village as 40 people in 11 households.
