= Shurja =

Village in Zanjan province, Iran

Shurja Persian: شورجا
- Village
- Location within Iran
- Coordinates: 35°57′33″N 48°20′00″E
- Country: Iran
- Province: Zanjan
- County: Khodabandeh
- District: Afshar
- Rural District: Shivanat

Population (2016)
  - Total: 84
- Time zone: UTC+3:30 (IRST)

Shurja (Persian: شورجا) (Note: Also romanized as Shūrjā; also known as Sarjāh, Shoorcheh, and Shūrjeh) is a village in Shivanat Rural District of Afshar District, Khodabandeh County in the Zanjan province, Iran.

== Demographics ==
=== Population ===
At the time of the 2006 National Census, the village's population was 241 in 45 households. The following census in 2011 counted 176 people in 43 households. The 2016 census measured the population of the village as 84 people in 20 households.
