= Kand-e Tatar =

Village in Zanjan province, Iran

Kand-e Tatar Persian: کند تاتار
- Village
- Location within Iran
- Coordinates: 35°53′59″N 47°54′43″E
- Country: Iran
- Province: Zanjan
- County: Khodabandeh
- District: Afshar
- Rural District: Shivanat

Population (2016)
  - Total: 51
- Time zone: UTC+3:30 (IRST)

Kand-e Tatar (Persian: کند تاتار) (Note: Also romanized as Kand Tātār and Kand-e Tātār; also known as Chashmeh Thāthār, Chashmeh-ye Tāteh, Cheshmeh Tātā, Cheshmeh Tātār (چشمه تاتار), Cheshmeh-ye Tāteh, and Kand Tātā) is a village in Shivanat Rural District of Afshar District in Khodabandeh County, Zanjan province, Iran.

== Demographics ==
=== Population ===
At the time of the 2006 National Census, the village's population was 78 in 20 households. The following census in 2011 counted 71 people in 21 households. The 2016 census measured the population of the village as 51 people in 14 households.
