= Nariman Qeshlaq =

Village in Zanjan province, Iran

Nariman Qeshlaq Persian: نريمان قشلاق
- Village
- Location within Iran
- Coordinates: 35°49′50″N 48°06′35″E
- Country: Iran
- Province: Zanjan
- County: Khodabandeh
- District: Afshar
- Rural District: Shivanat

Population (2016)
  - Total: 271
- Time zone: UTC+3:30 (IRST)

Nariman Qeshlaq (Persian: نريمان قشلاق) (Note: Also romanized as Narīmān Qeshlāq; also known as Nareiman Gheshlagh, Nāremān Qishlāq, Narīmān, and Narīmān Qeshlāqī) is a village in Shivanat Rural District of Afshar District in Khodabandeh County, Zanjan province, Iran.

== Demographics ==
=== Population ===
At the time of the 2006 National Census, the village's population was 329 in 76 households. The following census in 2011 counted 319 people in 89 households. The 2016 census measured the population of the village as 271 people in 74 households.
