= Qazoqluy-e Olya =

Village in Zanjan province, Iran

Qazoqluy-e Olya Persian: قازقلوي عليا
- Village
- Location within Iran
- Coordinates: 35°53′29″N 48°20′21″E
- Country: Iran
- Province: Zanjan
- County: Khodabandeh
- District: Afshar
- Rural District: Shivanat

Population (2016)
  - Total: 80
- Time zone: UTC+3:30 (IRST)

Qazoqluy-e Olya (Persian: قازقلوي عليا) (Note: Also romanized as Qāzoqlūy-e ‘Olyā; also known as Qārqolū, Qāzeqlū, Qāzlu, Qāzoghlū-ye ‘Olyā, Qāzoqlū, and Qāzoqlū-ye ‘Olyā) is a village in Shivanat Rural District of Afshar District in Khodabandeh County, Zanjan province, Iran.

== Demographics ==
=== Population ===
At the time of the 2006 National Census, the village's population was 86 in 17 households. The following census in 2011 counted 78 people in 21 households. The 2016 census measured the population of the village as 80 people in 22 households.
