= Aslanlu =

Village in Zanjan province, Iran

Aslanlu Persian: اقاچقلو
- Village
- Location within Iran
- Coordinates: 36°00′19″N 48°08′32″E
- Country: Iran
- Province: Zanjan
- County: Khodabandeh
- District: Afshar
- Rural District: Qeshlaqat-e Afshar

Population (2016)
  - Total: 18
- Time zone: UTC+3:30 (IRST)

Aslanlu (Persian: اصلانلو) (Note: Also romanized as Aşlānlū; also known as Isīlānlu) is a village in Qeshlaqat-e Afshar Rural District of Afshar District of Khodabandeh County, Zanjan province, Iran.

== Demographics ==
=== Population ===
At the time of the 2006 National Census, the village's population was 138 in 38 households. The following census in 2011 counted 41 people in 13 households. The 2016 census measured the population of the village as 18 people in five households.
