= Alaattinköy, Sivrice =

Village in Elazığ Province, Turkey

Alaattinköy
- Village
- Location in Turkey
- Coordinates: 38.376°N 39.305°E
- Country: Turkey
- Province: Elazığ
- District: Sivrice
- Population (2021): 90
- Time zone: UTC+3 (TRT)

Alaattinköy is a village in the Sivrice District of Elazığ Province in Turkey. The village is populated by Kurds and Muhacir Turks and had a population of 90 in 2021.
