= Isa Beyglu =

Village in Zanjan province, Iran

Isa Beyglu Persian: عيسي بيگلو
- Village
- Location within Iran
- Coordinates: 36°06′31″N 48°09′02″E
- Country: Iran
- Province: Zanjan
- County: Khodabandeh
- District: Afshar
- Rural District: Qeshlaqat-e Afshar

Population (2016)
  - Total: Below reporting threshold
- Time zone: UTC+3:30 (IRST)

Isa Beyglu (Persian: عيسي بيگلو) (Note: Also romanized as ‘Īsá Beyglū; also known as ‘Aīsbaklu and Īsā Beglū) is a village in Qeshlaqat-e Afshar Rural District of Afshar District of Khodabandeh County, Zanjan province, Iran.

== Demographics ==
=== Population ===
At the time of the 2006 National Census, the village's population was 23 in four households. The following censuses in 2011 and 2016 measured the population of the village as below the reporting threshold.
