= Quyjuq-e Olya =

Village in Zanjan province, Iran

Quyjuq-e Olya Persian: قويجوق عليا
- Village
- Location within Iran
- Coordinates: 35°55′56″N 47°53′29″E
- Country: Iran
- Province: Zanjan
- County: Khodabandeh
- District: Afshar
- Rural District: Qeshlaqat-e Afshar

Population (2016)
  - Total: 84
- Time zone: UTC+3:30 (IRST)

Quyjuq-e Olya (Persian: قويجوق عليا) (Note: Also romanized as Qūy Jūq-e ‘Olyā and Qūyjūq-e ‘Olyā) is a village in Qeshlaqat-e Afshar Rural District of Afshar District of Khodabandeh County, Zanjan province, Iran.

== Demographics ==
=== Population ===
At the time of the 2006 National Census, the village's population was 312 in 63 households. The following census in 2011 counted 162 people in 47 households. The 2016 census measured the population of the village as 84 people in 24 households.
