= Hasanlu, Zanjan =

Village in Zanjan province, Iran

Hasanlu Persian: حسن لو
- Village
- Location within Iran
- Coordinates: 35°57′14″N 47°59′30″E
- Country: Iran
- Province: Zanjan
- County: Khodabandeh
- District: Afshar
- Rural District: Qeshlaqat-e Afshar

Population (2016)
  - Total: 43
- Time zone: UTC+3:30 (IRST)

Hasanlu (Persian: حسن لو) (Note: Also romanized as Ḩasanlū) is a village in Qeshlaqat-e Afshar Rural District of Afshar District of Khodabandeh County, Zanjan province, Iran.

== Demographics ==
=== Population ===
At the time of the 2006 National Census, the village's population was 150 in 27 households. The following census in 2011 counted 104 people in 25 households. The 2016 census measured the population of the village as 43 people in 12 households.
