= Qelich Qayeh =

Village in Zanjan province, Iran

Qelich Qayeh Persian: قليچ قيه
- Village
- Location within Iran
- Coordinates: 36°01′32″N 48°08′05″E
- Country: Iran
- Province: Zanjan
- County: Khodabandeh
- District: Afshar
- Rural District: Qeshlaqat-e Afshar

Population (2016)
  - Total: 59
- Time zone: UTC+3:30 (IRST)

Qelich Qayeh (Persian: قليچ قيه) (Note: Also romanized as Qelīch Qayeh; also known as Qalajqiyeh, Qelesh Qayah, Qelesh Qayeh, and Qelīj Qayeh) is a village in Qeshlaqat-e Afshar Rural District of Afshar District of Khodabandeh County, Zanjan province, Iran.

== Demographics ==
=== Population ===
At the time of the 2006 National Census, the village's population was 116 in 22 households. The following census in 2011 counted 82 people in 25 households. The 2016 census measured the population of the village as 59 people in 16 households.
