= Aquí (disambiguation) =

Aquí is a 1997 album by Julieta Venegas.

Aquí may also refer to:

- Aquí, a 1979 album by Tito Rojas
- "Aquí", a 2006 song by Allison from Allison
- "Aquí", a 2000 song by La Ley from Uno
- Aquí (film), a dystopian drama film

== See also ==
- Aq Qui, Zanjan, a village in Iran
