= Bakhti =

Village in Zanjan province, Iran

Bakhti Persian: بختي
- Village
- Location within Iran
- Coordinates: 35°52′57″N 48°03′46″E
- Country: Iran
- Province: Zanjan
- County: Khodabandeh
- District: Afshar
- Rural District: Shivanat

Population (2016)
  - Total: 144
- Time zone: UTC+3:30 (IRST)

Bakhti (Persian: بختي) (Note: Also romanized as Bakhtī) is a village in Shivanat Rural District of Afshar District in Khodabandeh County, Zanjan province, Iran.

== Demographics ==
=== Population ===
At the time of the 2006 National Census, the village's population was 231 in 56 households. The following census in 2011 counted 193 people in 54 households. The 2016 census measured the population of the village as 144 people in 43 households.
