= Mostafalu, Zanjan =

Village in Zanjan province, Iran

Mostafalu Persian: مصطفي لو
- Village
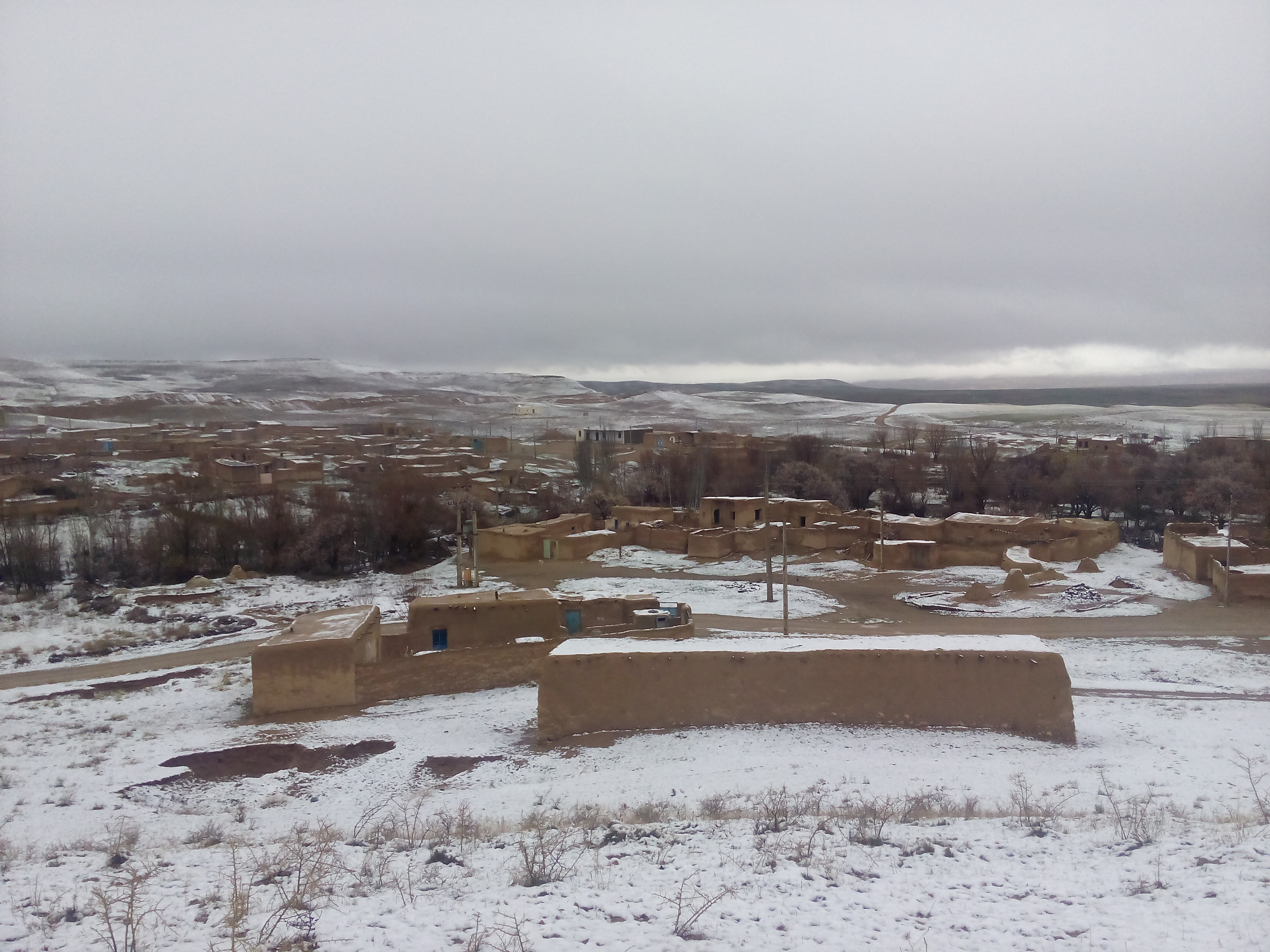
- Mostafalu in Winter 2018

- Location within Iran
- Coordinates: 35°56′56″N 48°01′44″E
- Country: Iran
- Province: Zanjan
- County: Khodabandeh
- District: Afshar
- Rural District: Shivanat

Population (2016)
  - Total: Below reporting threshold
- Time zone: UTC+3:30 (IRST)

Mostafalu (Persian: مصطفي لو) (Note: Also romanized as Mostafa Loo and Moşţafálū; also known as Mustāfiu) is a village in Shivanat Rural District of Afshar District in Khodabandeh County, Zanjan province, Iran.

== Demographics ==
=== Population ===
At the time of the 2006 National Census, the village's population was 143 in 30 households. The following census in 2011 counted 104 people in 29 households. The 2016 census measured the population of the village as below the reporting threshold.
