= Gol Bolagh, Zanjan =

Village in Zanjan province, Iran

Gol Bolagh Persian: گل بلاغ
- Village
- Location within Iran
- Coordinates: 36°02′42″N 47°58′45″E
- Country: Iran
- Province: Zanjan
- County: Khodabandeh
- District: Afshar
- Rural District: Qeshlaqat-e Afshar

Population (2016)
  - Total: 22
- Time zone: UTC+3:30 (IRST)

Gol Bolagh (Persian: گل بلاغ) (Note: Also romanized as Gol Bolāgh) is a village in Qeshlaqat-e Afshar Rural District of Afshar District of Khodabandeh County, Zanjan province, Iran.

== Demographics ==
=== Population ===
At the time of the 2006 National Census, the village's population was 59 in 13 households. The following census in 2011 counted 32 people in seven households. The 2016 census measured the population of the village as 22 people in seven households.
