= Gugarchinak =

Village in Zanjan province, Iran

Gugarchinak Persian: گوگر چينک
- Village
- Location within Iran
- Coordinates: 35°53′17″N 48°07′07″E
- Country: Iran
- Province: Zanjan
- County: Khodabandeh
- District: Afshar
- Rural District: Shivanat

Population (2016)
  - Total: 476
- Time zone: UTC+3:30 (IRST)

Gugarchinak (Persian: گوگر چينک) (Note: Also romanized as Googar Chīnak, Govarchīnak, and Gūgarchīnak; also known as Gohār Chānak, Gowgarchīnīk, and Gūrchīnak) is a village in Shivanat Rural District of Afshar District in Khodabandeh County, Zanjan province, Iran.

== Demographics ==
=== Population ===
At the time of the 2006 National Census, the village's population was 738 in 168 households. The following census in 2011 counted 927 people in 197 households. The 2016 census measured the population of the village as 476 people in 147 households.
