= Chariklu =

Village in Zanjan province, Iran

Chariklu Persian: چريكلو
- Village
- Location within Iran
- Coordinates: 36°05′10″N 48°04′25″E
- Country: Iran
- Province: Zanjan
- County: Khodabandeh
- District: Afshar
- Rural District: Qeshlaqat-e Afshar

Population (2016)
  - Total: 97
- Time zone: UTC+3:30 (IRST)

Chariklu (Persian: چريكلو) (Note: Also romanized as Chariklou and Charīklū; also known as Chirīklu) is a village in Qeshlaqat-e Afshar Rural District of Afshar District of Khodabandeh County, Zanjan province, Iran.

== Demographics ==
=== Population ===
At the time of the 2006 National Census, the village's population was 85 in 21 households. The following census in 2011 counted 62 people in 19 households. The 2016 census measured the population of the village as 97 people in 31 households.
