= Suleh, Zanjan =

Village in Zanjan province, Iran

Suleh Persian: سوله
- Village
- Location within Iran
- Coordinates: 35°52′07″N 48°11′48″E
- Country: Iran
- Province: Zanjan
- County: Khodabandeh
- District: Afshar
- Rural District: Shivanat

Population (2016)
  - Total: 365
- Time zone: UTC+3:30 (IRST)

Suleh (Persian: سوله) (Note: Also romanized as Sooleh and Sūleh; also known as Sallāh) is a village in Shivanat Rural District of Afshar District in Khodabandeh County, Zanjan province, Iran.

== Demographics ==
=== Population ===
At the time of the 2006 National Census, the village's population was 514 in 109 households. The following census in 2011 counted 462 people in 129 households. The 2016 census measured the population of the village as 365 people in 105 households.
