= Aqcheh Gonbad =

Village in Zanjan province, Iran

Aqcheh Gonbad Persian: اقچه گنبد
- Village
- Location within Iran
- Coordinates: 35°47′47″N 48°13′08″E
- Country: Iran
- Province: Zanjan
- County: Khodabandeh
- District: Afshar
- Rural District: Shivanat

Population (2016)
  - Total: 405
- Time zone: UTC+3:30 (IRST)

Aqcheh Gonbad (Persian: اقچه گنبد) (Note: Also romanized as Āqcheh Gonbad; also known as Āghcheh Gonbad, Aghcheh Gonbad, Āq Jāqumbez, Āqcheh Kand, Āqjakūmbez, and Āqjeh Gonbad) is a village in Shivanat Rural District of Afshar District in Khodabandeh County, Zanjan province, Iran.

== Demographics ==
=== Population ===
At the time of the 2006 National Census, the village's population was 449 in 100 households. The following census in 2011 counted 434 people in 115 households. The 2016 census measured the population of the village as 405 people in 114 households.
