= Taherlu, Zanjan =

Village in Zanjan province, Iran

Taherlu Persian: طاهرلو
- Village
- Location within Iran
- Coordinates: 36°07′16″N 48°07′43″E
- Country: Iran
- Province: Zanjan
- County: Khodabandeh
- District: Afshar
- Rural District: Qeshlaqat-e Afshar

Population (2016)
  - Total: 24
- Time zone: UTC+3:30 (IRST)

Taherlu (Persian: طاهرلو) (Note: Also romanized as Ţāherlū; also known as Dzhakhanshakhlu, Jahānshāhlū, and Jehānshāhlu) is a village in Qeshlaqat-e Afshar Rural District of Afshar District of Khodabandeh County, Zanjan province, Iran.

== Demographics ==
=== Population ===
At the time of the 2006 National Census, the village's population was 45 in 10 households. The following census in 2011 counted 35 people in 11 households. The 2016 census measured the population of the village as 24 people in seven households.
