= Duygulu, Sivrice =

Village in Elazığ Province, Turkey

Duygulu
- Village
- Location in Turkey
- Coordinates: 38.353°N 39.008°E
- Country: Turkey
- Province: Elazığ
- District: Sivrice
- Population (2021): 61
- Time zone: UTC+3 (TRT)

Duygulu is a village in the Sivrice District of Elazığ Province in Turkey. The village is populated by Kurds and Muhacir Turks and had a population of 61 in 2021.
