= Yasavol, Zanjan =

Village in Zanjan province, Iran

Yasavol Persian: يساول
- Village
- Location within Iran
- Coordinates: 36°00′11″N 47°57′57″E
- Country: Iran
- Province: Zanjan
- County: Khodabandeh
- District: Afshar
- Rural District: Qeshlaqat-e Afshar

Population (2016)
  - Total: 33
- Time zone: UTC+3:30 (IRST)

Yasavol (Persian: يساول) (Note: Also romanized as Yasāvol) is a village in Qeshlaqat-e Afshar Rural District of Afshar District of Khodabandeh County, Zanjan province, Iran.

== Demographics ==
=== Population ===
At the time of the 2006 National Census, the village's population was 64 in 12 households. The following census in 2011 counted 54 people in 14 households. The 2016 census measured the population of the village as 33 people in eight households.
