= Teymurlu, Zanjan =

Village in Zanjan province, Iran

Teymurlu Persian: تيمورلو
- Village
- Location within Iran
- Coordinates: 35°57′53″N 48°01′49″E
- Country: Iran
- Province: Zanjan
- County: Khodabandeh
- District: Afshar
- Rural District: Qeshlaqat-e Afshar

Population (2016)
  - Total: 17
- Time zone: UTC+3:30 (IRST)

Teymurlu (Persian: تيمورلو) (Note: Also romanized as Teimoor Loo and Teymūrlū; also known as Taimirili) is a village in Qeshlaqat-e Afshar Rural District of Afshar District of Khodabandeh County, Zanjan province, Iran.

== Demographics ==
=== Population ===
At the time of the 2006 National Census, the village's population was 92 in 23 households. The following census in 2011 counted 71 people in 20 households. The 2016 census measured the population of the village as 17 people in four households.
