= Burun, Iran =

Village in Zanjan province, Iran

Burun Persian: بورون
- Village
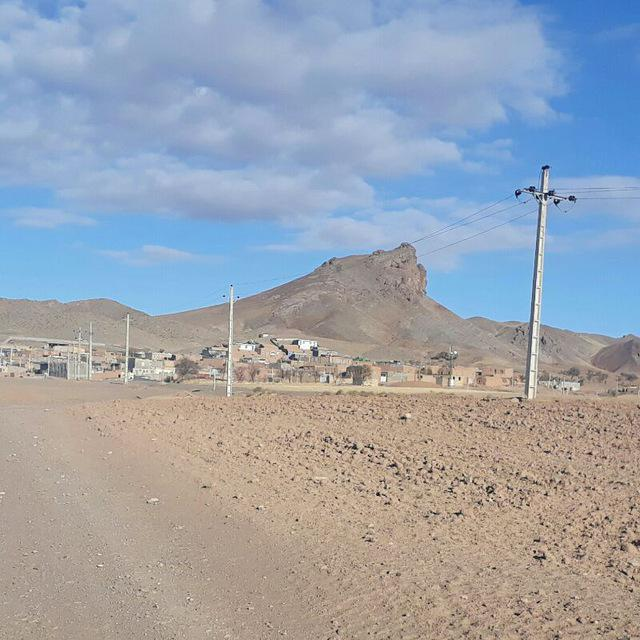
- The village of Burun

- Location within Iran
- Coordinates: 35°55′48″N 48°22′04″E
- Country: Iran
- Province: Zanjan
- County: Khodabandeh
- District: Afshar
- Rural District: Shivanat

Population (2016)
  - Total: 401
- Time zone: UTC+3:30 (IRST)

Burun (Persian: بورون) (Note: Also romanized as Būrūn; also known as Bīrūn, Boroon, and Borūn) is a village in Shivanat Rural District of Afshar District in Khodabandeh County, Zanjan province, Iran.

== Demographics ==
=== Population ===
At the time of the 2006 National Census, the village's population was 342 in 68 households. The following census in 2011 counted 355 people in 84 households. The 2016 census measured the population of the village as 401 people in 112 households.
