= Peyghambarlu =

Village in Zanjan province, Iran

Peyghambarlu Persian: پيغمبرلو
- Village
- Location within Iran
- Country: Iran
- Province: Zanjan
- County: Khodabandeh
- District: Afshar
- Rural District: Qeshlaqat-e Afshar

Population (2016)
  - Total: 22
- Time zone: UTC+3:30 (IRST)

Peyghambarlu (Persian: پيغمبرلو) (Note: Also romanized as Peyghambarlū) is a village in Qeshlaqat-e Afshar Rural District of Afshar District of Khodabandeh County, Zanjan province, Iran.

== Demographics ==
=== Population ===
At the time of the 2006 National Census, the village's population was 40 in 10 households. The following census in 2011 counted 16 people in five households. The 2016 census measured the population of the village as 22 people in four households.
