= Owli Beyk =

Village in Zanjan province, Iran

Owli Beyk Persian: اولي بيك
- Village
- Location within Iran
- Coordinates: 35°56′17″N 48°08′44″E
- Country: Iran
- Province: Zanjan
- County: Khodabandeh
- District: Afshar
- Rural District: Shivanat

Population (2016)
  - Total: 595
- Time zone: UTC+3:30 (IRST)

Owli Beyk (Persian: اولي بيك) (Note: Also romanized as Owlī Beyk; also known as Olībeyg and Owlī Beyg) is a village in Shivanat Rural District of Afshar District in Khodabandeh County, Zanjan province, Iran.

== Demographics ==
=== Population ===
At the time of the 2006 National Census, the village's population was 762 in 156 households. The following census in 2011 counted 728 people in 181 households. The 2016 census measured the population of the village as 595 people in 149 households.
