= Tuturqan =

Village in Zanjan province, Iran

Tuturqan Persian: توتورقان
- Village
- Location within Iran
- Coordinates: 36°00′26″N 48°00′16″E
- Country: Iran
- Province: Zanjan
- County: Khodabandeh
- District: Afshar
- Rural District: Qeshlaqat-e Afshar

Population (2016)
  - Total: 189
- Time zone: UTC+3:30 (IRST)

Tuturqan (Persian: توتورقان) (Note: Also romanized as Tūtūrqān; also known as Tūtūrqānlu) is a village in Qeshlaqat-e Afshar Rural District of Afshar District of Khodabandeh County, Zanjan province, Iran.

== Demographics ==
=== Population ===
At the time of the 2006 National Census, the village's population was 445 in 84 households. The following census in 2011 counted 315 people in 87 households. The 2016 census measured the population of the village as 189 people in 99 households. It was the most populous village in its rural district.
