= Aşağıçanakçı, Sivrice =

Village in Elazığ Province, Turkey

Aşağıçanakçı
- Village
- Location in Turkey
- Coordinates: 38.347°N 39.268°E
- Country: Turkey
- Province: Elazığ
- District: Sivrice
- Population (2021): 23
- Time zone: UTC+3 (TRT)

Aşağıçanakçı is a village in the Sivrice District of Elazığ Province in Turkey. The village is populated by Kurds and Muhacir Turks and had a population of 23 in 2021.
