= Mandaq =

Village in Zanjan province, Iran

Mandaq Persian: منداق
- Village
- Location within Iran
- Coordinates: 36°03′52″N 48°02′16″E
- Country: Iran
- Province: Zanjan
- County: Khodabandeh
- District: Afshar
- Rural District: Qeshlaqat-e Afshar

Population (2016)
  - Total: 97
- Time zone: UTC+3:30 (IRST)

Mandaq (Persian: منداق) (Note: Also romanized as Mandāq; also known as Mandak and Mîndâq) is a village in Qeshlaqat-e Afshar Rural District of Afshar District of Khodabandeh County, Zanjan province, Iran.

== Demographics ==
=== Population ===
At the time of the 2006 National Census, the village's population was 260 in 60 households. The following census in 2011 counted 162 people in 47 households. The 2016 census measured the population of the village as 97 people in 34 households.
