= Aji Kahriz =

Village in Zanjan province, Iran

Aji Kahriz Persian: اجي كهريز
- Village
- Location within Iran
- Coordinates: 36°03′16″N 48°00′08″E
- Country: Iran
- Province: Zanjan
- County: Khodabandeh
- District: Afshar
- Rural District: Qeshlaqat-e Afshar

Population (2016)
  - Total: 21
- Time zone: UTC+3:30 (IRST)

Aji Kahriz (Persian: اجي كهريز) (Note: Also romanized as Ājī Kahrīz; also known as Hāji Kehīrīz and Ḩājjī Kahrīz) is a village in Qeshlaqat-e Afshar Rural District of Afshar District of Khodabandeh County, Zanjan province, Iran.

== Demographics ==
=== Population ===
At the time of the 2006 National Census, the village's population was 42 in nine households. The following census in 2011 counted 23 people in six households. The 2016 census measured the population of the village as 21 people in six households.
