= Hesar-e Shivan =

Village in Zanjan province, Iran

Hesar-e Shivan Persian: حصارشيوان
- Village
- Location within Iran
- Coordinates: 35°53′45″N 48°05′42″E
- Country: Iran
- Province: Zanjan
- County: Khodabandeh
- District: Afshar
- Rural District: Shivanat

Population (2016)
  - Total: 77
- Time zone: UTC+3:30 (IRST)

Hesar-e Shivan (Persian: حصارشيوان) (Note: Also romanized as Ḩeşār Shīvān) is a village in Shivanat Rural District of Afshar District in Khodabandeh County, Zanjan province, Iran.

== Demographics ==
=== Population ===
At the time of the 2006 National Census, the village's population was 86 in 17 households. The following census in 2011 counted 86 people in 19 households. The 2016 census measured the population of the village as 77 people in 19 households.
