= Kordlu =

Kordlu (Persian: کردلو) may refer to:

- Kordlu, Ardabil
- Kordlu, Zanjan
