= Günay =

Günay is a Turkish surname and sometimes first name for males and females. It means a moon, which is seen in daylight. The Azerbaijani equivalent of the name is Günay.

Notable people with the name include:

== Given name ==
- Gunay Aghakishiyeva, Azerbaijani female taekwondo practitioner
- Günay Güvenç, Turkish footballer
- Gunay Mehdizade, Azerbaijani painter
- Gunay Mammadzada, Azerbaijani chess player

== Surname ==
- Ayşegül Günay (born 1992), Turkish female basketball player
- Damla Günay (born 1982), Turkish female archer
- Ertuğrul Günay (born 1948), Turkish politician and former government minister
- İzzet Günay (born 1934), Turkish film and theatre/stage actor

== Places ==
- Günay, Sivrice
