= Qameshlu, Afshar =

Village in Zanjan province, Iran

Qameshlu Persian: قمشلو
- Village
- Location within Iran
- Coordinates: 35°56′37″N 48°05′29″E
- Country: Iran
- Province: Zanjan
- County: Khodabandeh
- District: Afshar
- Rural District: Shivanat

Population (2016)
  - Total: 68
- Time zone: UTC+3:30 (IRST)

Qameshlu (Persian: قمشلو) (Note: Also romanized as Qameshlū; also known as Ghamesloo and Kāmeshlu) is a village in Shivanat Rural District of Afshar District in Khodabandeh County, Zanjan province, Iran.

== Demographics ==
=== Population ===
At the time of the 2006 National Census, the village's population was 133 in 33 households. The following census in 2011 counted 132 people in 37 households. The 2016 census measured the population of the village as 68 people in 20 households.
