= Dini Beyk =

Village in Zanjan province, Iran

Dini Beyk Persian: ديني بيك
- Village
- Location within Iran
- Coordinates: 35°49′17″N 48°04′34″E
- Country: Iran
- Province: Zanjan
- County: Khodabandeh
- District: Afshar
- Rural District: Shivanat

Population (2016)
  - Total: 78
- Time zone: UTC+3:30 (IRST)

Dini Beyk (Persian: ديني بيك) (Note: Also romanized as Dīnī Beyk; also known as Dīn Beyg and Dīnī Bak) is a village in Shivanat Rural District of Afshar District in Khodabandeh County, Zanjan province, Iran.

== Demographics ==
=== Population ===
At the time of the 2006 National Census, the village's population was 114 in 23 households. The following census in 2011 counted 103 people in 27 households. The 2016 census measured the population of the village as 78 people in 19 households.
