= Ali Mardan, Zanjan =

Village in Zanjan province, Iran

Ali Mardan Persian: علی‌مردان
- Village
- Location within Iran
- Coordinates: 36°04′11″N 47°59′28″E
- Country: Iran
- Province: Zanjan
- County: Khodabandeh
- District: Afshar
- Rural District: Qeshlaqat-e Afshar

Population (2016)
  - Total: 26
- Time zone: UTC+3:30 (IRST)

Ali Mardan (Persian: علی‌مردان) (Note: Also romanized as ‘Alī Mardān and ‘Alīmardān) is a village in Qeshlaqat-e Afshar Rural District of Afshar District of Khodabandeh County, Zanjan province, Iran.

== Demographics ==
=== Population ===
At the time of the 2006 National Census, the village's population was 112 in 20 households. The following census in 2011 counted 51 people in 11 households. The 2016 census measured the population of the village as 26 people in six households.
