= Qareh Vali, Zanjan =

Village in Zanjan province, Iran

Qareh Vali Persian: قره ولي
- Village
- Location within Iran
- Coordinates: 35°50′19″N 48°19′03″E
- Country: Iran
- Province: Zanjan
- County: Khodabandeh
- District: Afshar
- Rural District: Shivanat

Population (2016)
  - Total: 303
- Time zone: UTC+3:30 (IRST)

Qareh Vali (Persian: قره ولي) (Note: Also romanized as Qarah Valī and Qareh Valī; also known as Ghareh Vali, Qarāvalī, and Qarāwāli) is a village in Shivanat Rural District of Afshar District in Khodabandeh County, Zanjan province, Iran.

== Demographics ==
=== Population ===
At the time of the 2006 National Census, the village's population was 390 in 83 households. The following census in 2011 counted 348 people in 107 households. The 2016 census measured the population of the village as 303 people in 104 households.
