= Üğrük, Sivrice =

Village in Elazığ Province, Turkey

Üğrük
- Village
- Location in Turkey
- Coordinates: 38.316°N 39.181°E
- Country: Turkey
- Province: Elazığ
- District: Sivrice
- Population (2021): 43
- Time zone: UTC+3 (TRT)

Üğrük is a village in the Sivrice District of Elazığ Province in Turkey. The village is populated by Muslim Armenians, Kurds and Muhacir Turks, and had a population of 43 in 2021. The hamlet of Canbey is attached to the village.
