= Kürkköy, Sivrice =

Village in Turkey

Kürkköy
- Village
- Location in Turkey
- Coordinates: 38°26′N 39°14′E
- Country: Turkey
- Province: Elazığ
- District: Sivrice
- Population (2021): 146
- Time zone: UTC+3 (TRT)

Kürkköy is a village in the Sivrice District of Elazığ Province in Turkey. Its population is 146 (2021). The village is populated by Turks.
