= Kam Lar, Zanjan =

Village in Zanjan province, Iran

Kam Lar Persian: كملر
- Village
- Location within Iran
- Coordinates: 36°00′27″N 48°06′01″E
- Country: Iran
- Province: Zanjan
- County: Khodabandeh
- District: Afshar
- Rural District: Qeshlaqat-e Afshar

Population (2016)
  - Total: 21
- Time zone: UTC+3:30 (IRST)

Kam Lar (Persian: كملر) (Note: Also romanized as Kamalar, Kamlar, Kemlar, and Komlar; also known as Kimlar and Komeh Lar) is a village in Qeshlaqat-e Afshar Rural District of Afshar District of Khodabandeh County, Zanjan province, Iran.

== Demographics ==
=== Population ===
At the time of the 2006 National Census, the village's population was 31 in seven households. The following census in 2011 counted 29 people in seven households. The 2016 census measured the population of the village as 21 people in five households.
