= Canuşağı, Sivrice =

Village in Elazığ Province, Turkey

Canuşağı
- Village
- Location in Turkey
- Coordinates: 38.372°N 38.980°E
- Country: Turkey
- Province: Elazığ
- District: Sivrice
- Population (2021): 45
- Time zone: UTC+3 (TRT)

Canuşağı is a village in the Sivrice District of Elazığ Province in Turkey. The village is populated by Kurds of the Herdî tribe and had a population of 45 in 2021.

The hamlets of Alibey, Bingöl, Düzyol, İncetaş and Konak are attached to the village.
