= Haftasar =

Village in Turkey

- Village
- Location in Turkey
- Coordinates: 38°25′N 39°16′E
- Country: Turkey
- Province: Elazığ
- District: Sivrice
- Population (2021): 70
- Time zone: UTC+3 (TRT)

Haftasar (formerly: Düzbahçe) is a village in the Sivrice District of Elazığ Province in Turkey. Its population is 70 (2021). The village is populated by Kurds.
