= Kılıçkaya, Sivrice =

Village in Turkey

Kılıçkaya
- Village
- Location in Turkey
- Coordinates: 38.365°N 39.099°E
- Country: Turkey
- Province: Elazığ
- District: Sivrice
- Population (2021): 20
- Time zone: UTC+3 (TRT)

Kılıçkaya is a village in the Sivrice District of Elazığ Province in Turkey. Its population is 20 (2021). The village is populated by Turks.
