= Nergize, Sivrice =

Village in Elazığ Province, Turkey

Nergize
- Village
- Location in Turkey
- Coordinates: 38.372°N 39.197°E
- Country: Turkey
- Province: Elazığ
- District: Sivrice
- Population (2021): 47
- Time zone: UTC+3 (TRT)

Nergize (formerly Doğansu) is a village in the Sivrice District of Elazığ Province in Turkey. Its population is 47 (2021). The village is populated by Kurds.
