= Kavallı, Sivrice =

Village in Turkey

Kavallı
- Village
- Location in Turkey
- Coordinates: 38.479°N 39.154°E
- Country: Turkey
- Province: Elazığ
- District: Sivrice
- Population (2021): 79
- Time zone: UTC+3 (TRT)

Kavallı is a village in the Sivrice District of Elazığ Province in Turkey. Its population is 79 (2021). The village is populated by Turks.
