= Choqluy-e Sofla =

Village in Zanjan province, Iran

Choqluy-e Sofla Persian: چقلوي سفلي
- Village
- Location within Iran
- Coordinates: 35°59′38″N 48°06′44″E
- Country: Iran
- Province: Zanjan
- County: Khodabandeh
- District: Afshar
- Rural District: Qeshlaqat-e Afshar

Population (2016)
  - Total: 33
- Time zone: UTC+3:30 (IRST)

Choqluy-e Sofla (Persian: چقلوي سفلي) (Note: Also romanized as Choqlūy-e Soflá; also known as Chaghalū-ye Pā’īn, Chaghlooy Sofla, Chaghalū-ye Soflá, Chonglu Pāīn, Choqlū-ye Soflá, Chūqlū-ye Soflá, and Jaghalū-ye Soflá) is a village in Qeshlaqat-e Afshar Rural District of Afshar District of Khodabandeh County, Zanjan province, Iran.

== Demographics ==
=== Population ===
At the time of the 2006 National Census, the village's population was 225 in 48 households. The following census in 2011 counted 136 people in 37 households. The 2016 census measured the population of the village as 33 people in 10 households.
