= Tazeh Qeshlaq, Zanjan =

Village in Zanjan province, Iran

Tazeh Qeshlaq Persian: تازه قشلاق
- Village
- Location within Iran
- Coordinates: 36°08′30″N 48°01′53″E
- Country: Iran
- Province: Zanjan
- County: Khodabandeh
- District: Afshar
- Rural District: Qeshlaqat-e Afshar

Population (2016)
  - Total: 18
- Time zone: UTC+3:30 (IRST)

Tazeh Qeshlaq (Persian: تازه قشلاق) (Note: Also romanized as Tāzeh Qeshlāq) is a village in Qeshlaqat-e Afshar Rural District of Afshar District of Khodabandeh County, Zanjan province, Iran.

== Demographics ==
=== Population ===
At the time of the 2006 National Census, the village's population was 39 in 10 households. The following census in 2011 counted 22 people in six households. The 2016 census measured the population of the village as 18 people in five households.
