= Vakil Qeshlaq =

Village in Zanjan province, Iran

Vakil Qeshlaq Persian: وكيل قشلاق
- Village
- Location within Iran
- Coordinates: 36°08′41″N 48°02′46″E
- Country: Iran
- Province: Zanjan
- County: Khodabandeh
- District: Afshar
- Rural District: Qeshlaqat-e Afshar

Population (2016)
  - Total: 20
- Time zone: UTC+3:30 (IRST)

Vakil Qeshlaq (Persian: وكيل قشلاق) (Note: Also romanized as Vakīl Qeshlāq; also known as Qishlaqs, Tāzeh Qeshlāq, Vakil-Kishlaki, and Vakīl Qeshlāqī) is a village in Qeshlaqat-e Afshar Rural District of Afshar District of Khodabandeh County, Zanjan province, Iran.

== Demographics ==
=== Population ===
At the time of the 2006 National Census, the village's population was 32 in five households. The following census in 2011 counted 21 people in six households. The 2016 census measured the population of the village as 20 people in five households.
