= Sivrice District =

- District
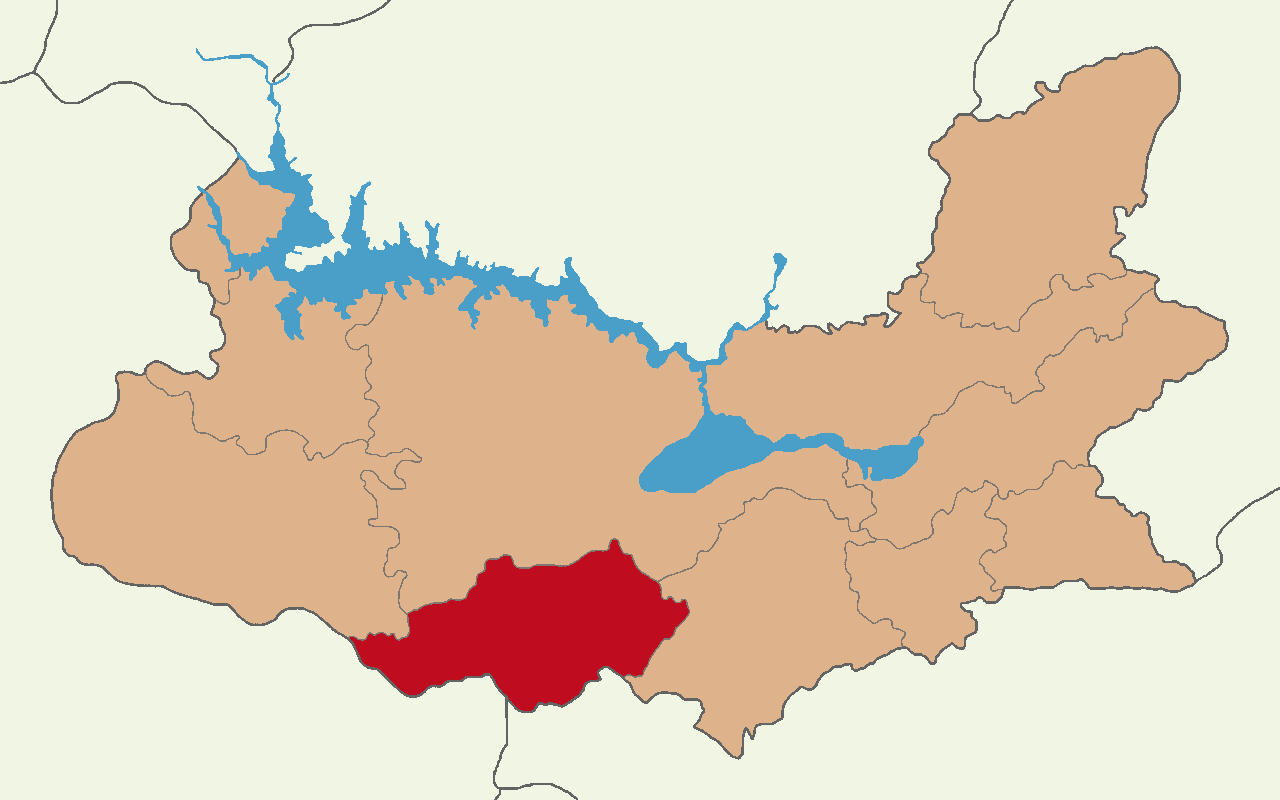
- Map showing Sivrice District in Elazığ Province

- Location in Turkey
- Coordinates: 38°27′N 39°19′E
- Country: Turkey
- Province: Elazığ
- Seat: Sivrice

Government
  - Kaymakam: Yunus Emre Vural
- Area: 710 km^{2} (270 sq mi)
- Population (2021): 7,703
  - Density: 11/km^{2} (28/sq mi)
- Time zone: UTC+3 (TRT)

Sivrice District is a district of Elazığ Province of Turkey. Its seat is the town Sivrice. Its area is 710 km^{2}, and its population is 7,703 (2021). The district was established in 1936.

== Composition ==
There is 1 municipality in Sivrice District:

- Sivrice

There are 50 villages in Sivrice District:

- Akbuğday
- Akseki
- Alaattinköy
- Alıncık
- Aşağıçanakçı
- Başkaynak
- Bekçitepe
- Canuşağı
- Çatakkaya
- Çevrimtaş
- Çortunlu
- Dedeyolu
- Dereboynu
- Dikmen
- Doğanbağı
- Dörtbölük
- Duygulu
- Elmasuyu
- Gelindere
- Görgülü
- Gözeli
- Günay
- Günbalı
- Hacılar
- Haftasar
- Ilıncak
- Kalaba
- Kamışlık
- Kavakköy
- Kavallı
- Kayabağları
- Kayapınar
- Kılıçkaya
- Kösebayır
- Kürkköy
- Mollaali
- Nergize
- Soğukpınar
- Sürek
- Tarlatepe
- Taşlıyayla
- Topaluşağı
- Uslu
- Üçlerce
- Üğrük
- Yaruşağı
- Yedikardeş
- Yedipınar
- Yukarıçanakçı
- Yürekkaya
