= Tarlatepe, Sivrice =

Village in Elazığ Province, Turkey

Tarlatepe
- Village
- Location in Turkey
- Coordinates: 38.407°N 39.016°E
- Country: Turkey
- Province: Elazığ
- District: Sivrice
- Population (2021): 67
- Time zone: UTC+3 (TRT)

Tarlatepe is a village in the Sivrice District of Elazığ Province in Turkey. The village is populated by Kurds of the Herdî tribe and had a population of 67 in 2021.

The hamlets of Kuzeydere, Sarıerik and Tilkiderre are attached to the village.
