= Çatakkaya, Sivrice =

Village in Turkey

Çatakkaya
- Village
- Location in Turkey
- Coordinates: 38.335°N 39.160°E
- Country: Turkey
- Province: Elazığ
- District: Sivrice
- Population (2021): 66
- Time zone: UTC+3 (TRT)

Çatakkaya is a village in the Sivrice District of Elazığ Province in Turkey. Its population is 66 (2021). The village is populated by Turks.
