= Çevrimtaş, Sivrice =

Village in Elazığ Province, Turkey

Çevrimtaş
- Village
- Location in Turkey
- Coordinates: 38.351°N 39.065°E
- Country: Turkey
- Province: Elazığ
- District: Sivrice
- Population (2021): 90
- Time zone: UTC+3 (TRT)

Çevrimtaş is a village in the Sivrice District of Elazığ Province in Turkey. The village had a population of 90 in 2021. The village is on the river Euphrates. The hamlet of Dirice is attached to the village.

On 24 Jan 2020 the village was impacted by a magnitude 6.7 earthquake.
