= Garmab =

City in Zanjan province, Iran

Garmab Persian: گرماب
- City
- Location within Iran
- Coordinates: 35°50′49″N 48°11′53″E
- Country: Iran
- Province: Zanjan
- County: Khodabandeh
- District: Afshar
- Established as a city: 1996

Population (2016)
  - Total: 4,023
- Time zone: UTC+3:30 (IRST)

Garmab (Persian: گرماب) (Note: Also romanized as Garm Āb, Garmaab, and Garmāb) is a city in, and the capital of, Afshar District in Khodabandeh County, Zanjan province, Iran. It also serves as the administrative center for Shivanat Rural District. The village of Garmab was converted to a city in 1996.

== Demographics ==
=== Population ===
At the time of the 2006 National Census, the city's population was 3,274 in 772 households. The following census in 2011 counted 4,021 people in 965 households. The 2016 census measured the population of the city as 3,823 people in 1,037 households.
