= Yedikardeş, Sivrice =

Village in Elazığ Province, Turkey

Yedikardeş
- Village
- Location in Turkey
- Coordinates: 38.420°N 39.280°E
- Country: Turkey
- Province: Elazığ
- District: Sivrice
- Population (2021): 36
- Time zone: UTC+3 (TRT)

Yedikardeş is a village in the Sivrice District of Elazığ Province in Turkey. Its population is 36 (2021). The village is populated by Kurds.
