= Qeshlaqat-e Afshar Rural District =

Rural district in Zanjan province, Iran

Qeshlaqat-e Afshar Rural District Persian: دهستان قشلاقات افشار
- Rural District
- Location within Iran
- Coordinates: 36°02′N 48°06′E
- Country: Iran
- Province: Zanjan
- County: Khodabandeh
- District: Afshar
- Established: 1986
- Capital: Bash Qeshlaq

Population (2016)
  - Total: 1,823
- Time zone: UTC+3:30 (IRST)

Qeshlaqat-e Afshar Rural District (Persian: دهستان قشلاقات افشار) is in Afshar District of Khodabandeh County, Zanjan province, Iran. Its capital is the village of Bash Qeshlaq.

== Demographics ==
=== Population ===
At the time of the 2006 National Census, the rural district's population was 4,067 in 854 households. There were 2,813 inhabitants in 726 households at the following census of 2011. The 2016 census measured the population of the rural district as 1,823 in 500 households. The most populous of its 41 villages was Tuturqan, with 189 people.

=== Other villages in the rural district ===
- Gowgjah Gz
- Afsharlu
- Aji Kahriz
- Ali Mardan
- Aq Qui
- Aqa Choqlu
- Aslanlu
- Baghlujeh
- Chariklu
- Choqluy-e Olya
- Choqluy-e Sofla
- Gandab
- Gol Bolagh
- Hasanlu
- Isa Beyglu
- Jomehlu
- Kam Lar
- Kardlu
- Khalifehlu
- Mahdilu
- Mandaq
- Mohammadlu
- Peyghambarlu
- Qelich Qayeh
- Quyjuq-e Olya
- Taherlu
- Tazeh Qeshlaq
- Teymurlu
- Towhidlu
- Vakil Qeshlaq
- Varmanlu
- Yasavol
