= Ilıncak, Sivrice =

Village in Elazığ Province, Turkey

Ilıncak
- Village
- Location in Turkey
- Coordinates: 38.338°N 39.026°E
- Country: Turkey
- Province: Elazığ
- District: Sivrice
- Population (2021): 43
- Time zone: UTC+3 (TRT)

Ilıncak is a village in the Sivrice District of Elazığ Province in Turkey. The village had a population of 43 in 2021.
