= Gözeli, Sivrice =

Village in Elazığ Province, Turkey

Gözeli
- Village
- Location in Turkey
- Coordinates: 38.429°N 39.060°E
- Country: Turkey
- Province: Elazığ
- District: Sivrice
- Population (2021): 246
- Time zone: UTC+3 (TRT)

Gözeli (Kurdish: Mercumut) is a village in the Sivrice District of Elazığ Province in Turkey. The village is populated by Kurds of the Herdî tribe and had a population of 246 in 2021.

The hamlets of Ağaçaltı, Akyazı, Akyürek, Alakuş, Aşağı Büklüm, Atyurdu, Aydınlık, Ayranlı, Bezirgölü, Binektaşı, Cami, Çakırlar, Çırpılı, Doğumlu, Ekmekli, Geruşağı, Kekeçler, Mollaali, Yeni and Yukarı Büklüm are attached to the village.
