= Mollaali, Sivrice =

Village in Turkey

Mollaali
- Village
- Location in Turkey
- Coordinates: 38.493°N 39.113°E
- Country: Turkey
- Province: Elazığ
- District: Sivrice
- Population (2021): 32
- Time zone: UTC+3 (TRT)

Mollaali is a village in the Sivrice District of Elazığ Province in Turkey. Its population is 32 (2021). The village is populated by Kurds.
