= Dereboynu, Sivrice =

Village in Turkey

Dereboynu
- Village
- Location in Turkey
- Coordinates: 38°27′N 39°07′E
- Country: Turkey
- Province: Elazığ
- District: Sivrice
- Population (2021): 41
- Time zone: UTC+3 (TRT)

Dereboynu is a village in the Sivrice District of Elazığ Province in Turkey. Its population is 41 (2021). The village is populated by Kurds.
