= Towhidlu, Zanjan =

Village in Zanjan province, Iran

Towhidlu Persian: توحيدلو
- Village
- Location within Iran
- Coordinates: 35°58′50″N 48°10′23″E
- Country: Iran
- Province: Zanjan
- County: Khodabandeh
- District: Afshar
- Rural District: Qeshlaqat-e Afshar

Population (2016)
  - Total: 91
- Time zone: UTC+3:30 (IRST)

Towhidlu (Persian: توحيدلو) (Note: Also romanized as Towḩīdlū; also known as Tohāndlu) is a village in Qeshlaqat-e Afshar Rural District of Afshar District of Khodabandeh County, Zanjan province, Iran.

== Demographics ==
=== Population ===
At the time of the 2006 National Census, the village's population was 160 in 43 households. The following census in 2011 counted 134 people in 41 households. The 2016 census measured the population of the village as 91 people in 25 households.
