= Mohammadlu, Zanjan =

Village in Zanjan province, Iran

Mohammadlu Persian: محمدلو
- Village
- Location within Iran
- Coordinates: 35°58′06″N 48°01′27″E
- Country: Iran
- Province: Zanjan
- County: Khodabandeh
- District: Afshar
- Rural District: Qeshlaqat-e Afshar

Population (2016)
  - Total: 75
- Time zone: UTC+3:30 (IRST)

Mohammadlu (Persian: محمدلو) (Note: Also romanized as Moḩammadlū) is a village in Qeshlaqat-e Afshar Rural District of Afshar District of Khodabandeh County, Zanjan province, Iran.

== Demographics ==
=== Population ===
At the time of the 2006 National Census, the village's population was 147 in 33 households. The following census in 2011 counted 135 people in 37 households. The 2016 census measured the population of the village as 75 people in 19 households.
