= Aq Qui, Zanjan =

Village in Zanjan province, Iran

Aq Qui Persian: آق قوئي
- Village
- Location within Iran
- Coordinates: 36°04′43″N 48°00′46″E
- Country: Iran
- Province: Zanjan
- County: Khodabandeh
- District: Afshar
- Rural District: Qeshlaqat-e Afshar

Population (2016)
  - Total: 35
- Time zone: UTC+3:30 (IRST)

Aq Qui (Persian: آق قوئي) (Note: Also romanized as Āq Qū’ī; also known as Aghoo’i, Aq Qūeh, and Āqū’ī) is a village in Qeshlaqat-e Afshar Rural District of Afshar District of Khodabandeh County, Zanjan province, Iran.

== Demographics ==
=== Population ===
At the time of the 2006 National Census, the village's population was 45 in seven households. The following census in 2011 counted 38 people in nine households. The 2016 census measured the population of the village as 35 people in nine households.
