= Çortunlu, Sivrice =

Village in Elazığ Province, Turkey

Çortunlu
- Village
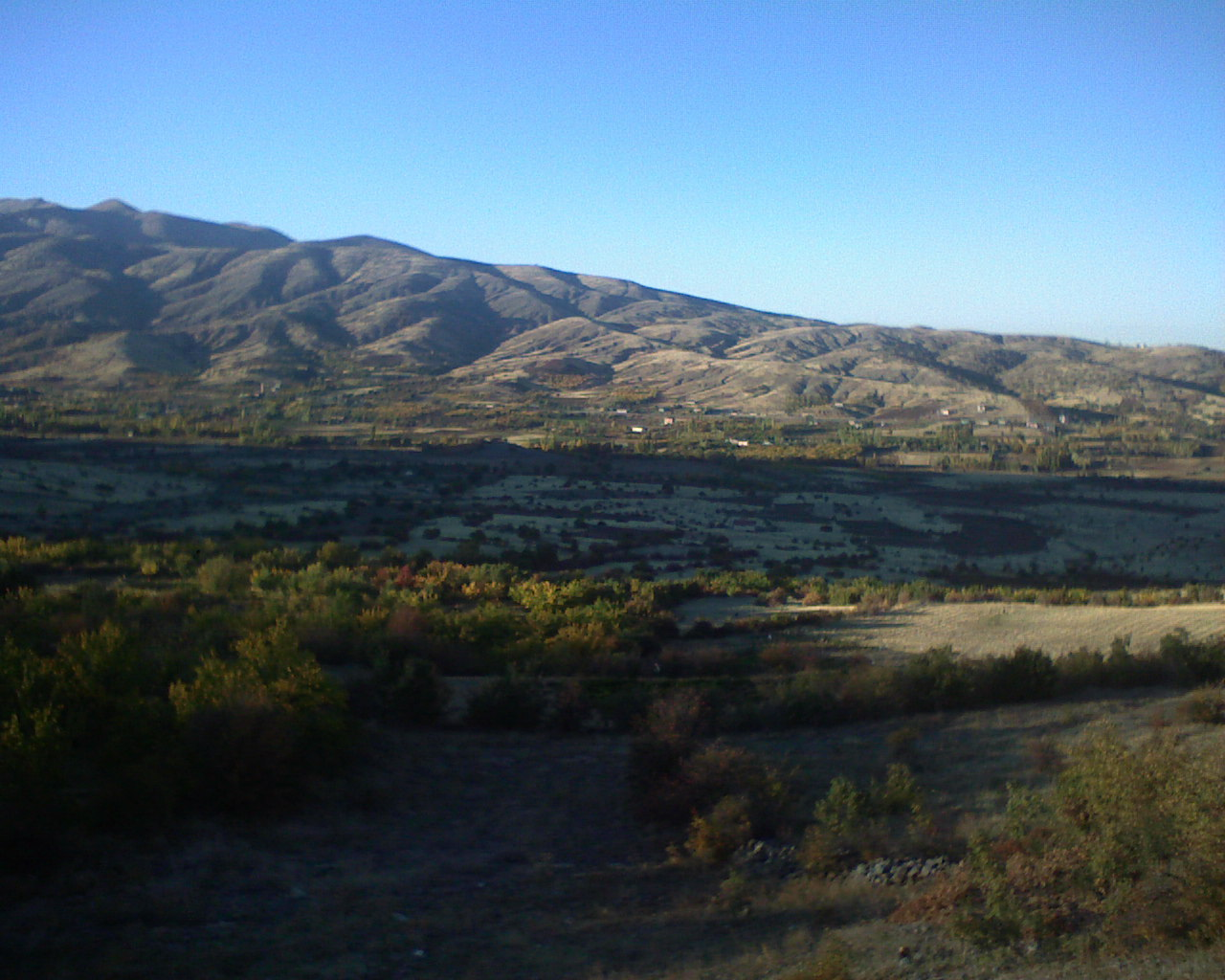

- Location within Turkey
- Coordinates: 38.432°N 39.014°E
- Country: Turkey
- Province: Elazığ
- District: Sivrice
- Population (2021): 51
- Time zone: UTC+3 (TRT)

Çortunlu (Kurdish: Çortun) is a village in the Sivrice District of Elazığ Province in Turkey. The village is populated by Kurds of the Herdî tribe and had a population of 51 in 2021.

The hamlets of Demuşağı and Kasımuşağı are attached to the village.
