= Hacılar, Sivrice =

Village in Elazığ Province, Turkey

Hacılar
- Village
- Location in Turkey
- Coordinates: 38.315°N 39.241°E
- Country: Turkey
- Province: Elazığ
- District: Sivrice
- Population (2021): 30
- Time zone: UTC+3 (TRT)

Hacılar is a village in the Sivrice District of Elazığ Province in Turkey. Its population is 30 (2021). The village is populated by Turks.
