= Günbalı, Sivrice =

Village in Turkey

Günbalı
- Village
- Location in Turkey
- Coordinates: 38.472°N 39.132°E
- Country: Turkey
- Province: Elazığ
- District: Sivrice
- Population (2021): 47
- Time zone: UTC+3 (TRT)

Günbalı is a village in the Sivrice District of Elazığ Province in Turkey. Its population is 47 (2021). The village is populated by Kurds of the Herdî tribe.
