= Shivanat Rural District =

Rural district in Zanjan province, Iran

Shivanat Rural District Persian: دهستان شيوانات
- Rural District
- Location within Iran
- Coordinates: 35°50′N 48°10′E
- Country: Iran
- Province: Zanjan
- County: Khodabandeh
- District: Afshar
- Established: 1986
- Capital: Garmab

Population (2016)
  - Total: 6,778
- Time zone: UTC+3:30 (IRST)

Shivanat Rural District (Persian: دهستان شيوانات) is in Afshar District of Khodabandeh County, Zanjan province, Iran. It is administered from the city of Garmab.

== Demographics ==
=== Population ===
At the time of the 2006 National Census, the rural district's population was 8,963 in 1,919 households. There were 8,469 inhabitants in 2,229 households at the following census of 2011. The 2016 census measured the population of the rural district as 6,778 in 1,870 households. The most populous of its 34 villages was Qui, with 793 people.

=== Other villages in the rural district ===
- Aqcheh Gonbad
- Bakhti
- Burun
- Dini Beyk
- Fereydun
- Gugarchinak
- Gunay
- Hesar-e Olya
- Hesar-e Shivan
- Hesar-e Sofla
- Kand-e Tatar
- Khalifeh Qeshlaq
- Mesgar
- Mesrabad
- Mohammad Shahlu
- Mostafalu
- Nariman Qeshlaq
- Owli Beyk
- Qamcheqay
- Qameshlu
- Qareh Vali
- Qazoqluy-e Olya
- Shurja
- Suleh
- Tatardeh
- Yengiabad
- Yuz Bashi
