= Kardlu =

Village in Zanjan province, Iran

Kardlu Persian: كردلو
- Village
- Location within Iran
- Coordinates: 36°02′01″N 48°10′44″E
- Country: Iran
- Province: Zanjan
- County: Khodabandeh
- District: Afshar
- Rural District: Qeshlaqat-e Afshar

Population (2016)
  - Total: 60
- Time zone: UTC+3:30 (IRST)

Kardlu (Persian: كردلو) (Note: Also romanized as Kardlū and Kordlū; also known as Gardlū, Kurdulu, and Kūridlu) is a village in Qeshlaqat-e Afshar Rural District of Afshar District of Khodabandeh County, Zanjan province, Iran.

== Demographics ==
=== Population ===
At the time of the 2006 National Census, the village's population was 96 in 20 households. The following census in 2011 counted 78 people in 17 households. The 2016 census measured the population of the village as 60 people in 17 households.
