= Kayapınar, Sivrice =

Kayapınar
- Village
- Location in Turkey
- Coordinates: 38°18′43″N 39°12′15″E
- Country: Turkey
- Province: Elazığ
- District: Sivrice
- Population (2021): 61
- Time zone: UTC+3 (TRT)

Kayapınar is a village in the Sivrice District of Elazığ Province in Turkey. Its population is 61 (2021). The village is populated by Turks.
