= Yedipınar, Sivrice =

Village in Turkey

Yedipınar
- Village
- Location in Turkey
- Coordinates: 38.416°N 39.204°E
- Country: Turkey
- Province: Elazığ
- District: Sivrice
- Population (2021): 52
- Time zone: UTC+3 (TRT)

Yedipınar is a village in the Sivrice District of Elazığ Province in Turkey. Its population is 52 (2021). The village is populated by Kurds.
