= Topaluşağı, Sivrice =

Village in Elazığ Province, Turkey

Topaluşağı
- Village
- Location in Turkey
- Coordinates: 38.349°N 38.982°E
- Country: Turkey
- Province: Elazığ
- District: Sivrice
- Population (2021): 81
- Time zone: UTC+3 (TRT)

Topaluşağı is a village in the Sivrice District of Elazığ Province in Turkey. The village is populated by Kurds of the Herdî tribe and had a population of 81 in 2021.

The hamlets of Ambarlı, Bekirağa, Derebey, Dönerkaya, Keçiler and Varlık are attached to the village.
