= Mesgar =

Village in Zanjan province, Iran

Mesgar Persian: مسگر
- Village
- Location within Iran
- Coordinates: 35°54′54″N 48°23′34″E
- Country: Iran
- Province: Zanjan
- County: Khodabandeh
- District: Afshar
- Rural District: Shivanat

Population (2016)
  - Total: 80
- Time zone: UTC+3:30 (IRST)

Mesgar (Persian: مسگر) (Note: Also known as Bāsh Qeshlāq and Misjad) is a village in Shivanat Rural District of Afshar District in Khodabandeh County, Zanjan province, Iran.

== Demographics ==
=== Population ===
At the time of the 2006 National Census, the village's population was 404 in 92 households. The following census in 2011 counted 369 people in 103 households. The 2016 census measured the population of the village as 363 people in 106 households.
