= Yukarıçanakçı, Sivrice =

Village in Turkey

Yukarıçanakçı
- Village
- Location in Turkey
- Coordinates: 38°21′N 39°16′E
- Country: Turkey
- Province: Elazığ
- District: Sivrice
- Population (2021): 27
- Time zone: UTC+3 (TRT)

Yukarıçanakçı is a village in the Sivrice District of Elazığ Province in Turkey. Its population was 27 in 2021. The village is populated by Kurds.
