= Mohammad Shahlu =

Village in Zanjan province, Iran

Mohammad Shahlu Persian: محمدشاه لو
- Village
- Location within Iran
- Coordinates: 35°56′14″N 47°56′27″E
- Country: Iran
- Province: Zanjan
- County: Khodabandeh
- District: Afshar
- Rural District: Shivanat

Population (2016)
  - Total: 48
- Time zone: UTC+3:30 (IRST)

Mohammad Shahlu (Persian: محمدشاه لو) (Note: Also romanized as Moḩammad Shāhlū; also known as Moḩammad Şāleḩ, Moḩammad Shālū, Moḩammadlū, and Muhammad Sālih) is a village in Shivanat Rural District of Afshar District in Khodabandeh County, Zanjan province, Iran.

== Demographics ==
=== Population ===
At the time of the 2006 National Census, the village's population was 101 in 31 households. The following census in 2011 counted 67 people in 21 households. The 2016 census measured the population of the village as 48 people in 15 households.
