= Choqluy-e Olya =

Village in Zanjan province, Iran

Choqluy-e Olya Persian: چقلوي عليا
- Village
- Location within Iran
- Coordinates: 35°59′33″N 48°03′28″E
- Country: Iran
- Province: Zanjan
- County: Khodabandeh
- District: Afshar
- Rural District: Qeshlaqat-e Afshar

Population (2016)
  - Total: 53
- Time zone: UTC+3:30 (IRST)

Choqluy-e Olya (Persian: چقلوي عليا) (Note: Also romanized as Choqlūy-e 'Olyā; also known as Chaghlooy Olya, Chaghalū-ye Bālā, Chaghalū-ye 'Olyā, Chonglu, Choqlū-ye 'Olyā, Chūqlū-ye 'Olyā, and Jaghalū-ye 'Olyā) is a village in Qeshlaqat-e Afshar Rural District of Afshar District of Khodabandeh County, Zanjan province, Iran.

== Demographics ==
=== Population ===
At the time of the 2006 National Census, the village's population was 120 in 24 households. The following census in 2011 counted 75 people in 22 households. The 2016 census measured the population of the village as 53 people in 15 households.
