= Alıncık, Sivrice =

Village in Turkey

Alıncık
- Village
- Location in Turkey
- Coordinates: 38°27′47″N 39°14′01″E
- Country: Turkey
- Province: Elazığ
- District: Sivrice
- Population (2021): 53
- Time zone: UTC+3 (TRT)

Alıncık is a village in the Sivrice District of Elazığ Province in Turkey. Its population is 53 (2021). The village is populated by Turks.
