= Gelindere, Sivrice =

Village in Elazığ Province, Turkey

Gelindere
- Village
- Location in Turkey
- Coordinates: 38.373°N 38.925°E
- Country: Turkey
- Province: Elazığ
- District: Sivrice
- Population (2021): 28
- Time zone: UTC+3 (TRT)

Gelindere is a village in the Sivrice District of Elazığ Province in Turkey. The village is populated by Kurds of the Herdî tribe and had a population of 28 in 2021.

The hamlets of Kasaplar, Samanlı and Yongalık are attached to the village.
