= Dedeyolu, Sivrice =

Village in Turkey

Dedeyolu
- Village
- Location in Turkey
- Coordinates: 38.469°N 39.199°E
- Country: Turkey
- Province: Elazığ
- District: Sivrice
- Population (2021): 254
- Time zone: UTC+3 (TRT)

Dedeyolu is a village in the Sivrice District of Elazığ Province in Turkey. Its population is 254 (2021). The village is populated by Turks.
