= Sürek, Sivrice =

Village in Turkey

Sürek
- Village
- Location in Turkey
- Coordinates: 38.454°N 39.394°E
- Country: Turkey
- Province: Elazığ
- District: Sivrice
- Population (2021): 142
- Time zone: UTC+3 (TRT)

Sürek is a village in the Sivrice District of Elazığ Province in Turkey. Its population is 142 (2021). The village is populated by Kurds.
