= Doğanbağı, Sivrice =

Village in Turkey

Doğanbağı
- Village
- Location in Turkey
- Coordinates: 38°21′N 39°05′E
- Country: Turkey
- Province: Elazığ
- District: Sivrice
- Population (2021): 53
- Time zone: UTC+3 (TRT)

Doğanbağı is a village in the Sivrice District of Elazığ Province in Turkey. Its population is 53 (2021). The village is populated by Turks.
