= Kayabağları, Sivrice =

Village in Elazığ Province, Turkey

Kayabağları
- Village
- Location in Turkey
- Coordinates: 38.379°N 38.899°E
- Country: Turkey
- Province: Elazığ
- District: Sivrice
- Population (2021): 29
- Time zone: UTC+3 (TRT)

Kayabağları (Kurdish: Pihti) is a village in the Sivrice District of Elazığ Province in Turkey. The village is populated by Kurds of the Herdî tribe and had a population of 29 in 2021.

The hamlet of Aylık is attached to the village.
