= Bash Qeshlaq, Zanjan =

Village in Zanjan province, Iran

Bash Qeshlaq Persian: باش قشلاق
- Village
- Location within Iran
- Coordinates: 36°02′38″N 48°04′45″E
- Country: Iran
- Province: Zanjan
- County: Khodabandeh
- District: Afshar
- Rural District: Qeshlaqat-e Afshar

Population (2016)
  - Total: 144
- Time zone: UTC+3:30 (IRST)

Bash Qeshlaq (Persian: باش قشلاق) (Note: Also romanized as Bāsh Qeshlāq; also known as Bāsh Qishlāq and Bashkishlak) is a village in, and capital of, Qeshlaqat-e Afshar Rural District in Afshar District of Khodabandeh County, Zanjan province, Iran.

== Demographics ==
=== Population ===
At the time of the 2006 National Census, the village's population was 185 in 45 households. The following census in 2011 counted 273 people in 35 households. The 2016 census measured the population of the village as 144 people in 33 households.
