= Kalaba, Sivrice =

Village in Turkey

Kalaba
- Village
- Location in Turkey
- Coordinates: 38.371°N 39.093°E
- Country: Turkey
- Province: Elazığ
- District: Sivrice
- Population (2021): 15
- Time zone: UTC+3 (TRT)

Kalaba is a village in the Sivrice District of Elazığ Province in Turkey. Its population is 15 (2021). The village is populated by Turks.
