= Lake Hazar =

Rift lake in the Taurus Mountains, Turkey

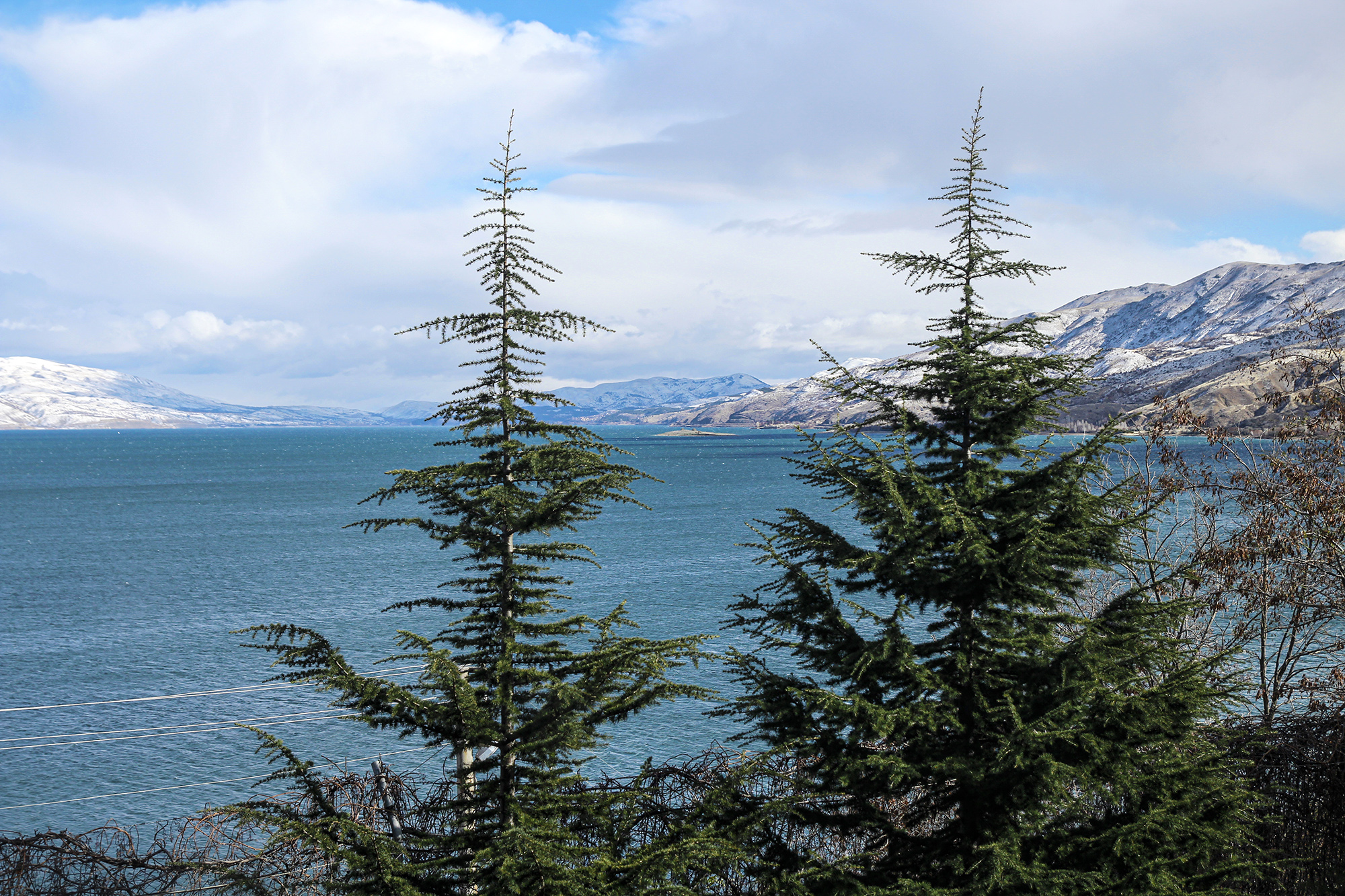
- Lake Hazar and pine trees

- Location within Turkey
- Location: Taurus Mountains
- Coordinates: 38°29′N 39°25′E
- Lake type: Rift lake
- Primary outflows: Tigris
- Basin countries: Turkey
- Max. length: 22 km (14 mi)
- Max. width: 6 km (3.7 mi)

Lake Hazar (Turkish: Hazar Gölü; Kurdish: Gola Hezarê; Armenian: Ծովք լիճ, romanized: Covk‘ lič) is a rift lake in the Taurus Mountains, 22 km southeast of Elazığ, notable as the source of the Tigris.

== Sunken city ==
Scientists found 4,000-year-old archaeological traces of a city, estimated to have been submerged since 1830, below the lake. Turkey wanted to register this historic 'Sunken City' in eastern Anatolia as a UNESCO World Heritage Site.

Ebubakar Irmak, mayor of Sivrice, dove into the lake in 2017 and found the remains of churches, walls of a castle, pots, pottery and glazed plates of the citadel with traces of the Seljuk, Byzantine and Ottoman eras. In 2019, amphora tombs were found in the sunken city.

Based on the writings of the Armenian author Urfali Mateos, who lived during the Seljuk era, researchers know that a small fortress once stood at this site during the Byzantine period, and that a monastery was subsequently built there in the Seljuk period.
