= Taşlıyayla, Sivrice =

Village in Elazığ Province, Turkey

Taşlıyayla
- Village
- Location in Turkey
- Coordinates: 38.381°N 38.977°E
- Country: Turkey
- Province: Elazığ
- District: Sivrice
- Population (2021): 38
- Time zone: UTC+3 (TRT)

Taşlıyayla is a village in the Sivrice District of Elazığ Province in Turkey. The village is populated by Kurds of the Herdî tribe and had a population of 38 in 2021.
