= Dikmen, Sivrice =

Village in Turkey

Dikmen
- Village
- Location in Turkey
- Coordinates: 38°19′20″N 39°09′19″E
- Country: Turkey
- Province: Elazığ
- District: Sivrice
- Population (2021): 40
- Time zone: UTC+3 (TRT)

Dikmen is a village in the Sivrice District of Elazığ Province in Turkey. Its population is 40 (2021). The village is populated by Turks.
