= Yaruşağı, Sivrice =

Village in Elazığ Province, Turkey

Yaruşağı
- Village
- Location in Turkey
- Coordinates: 38.425°N 38.990°E
- Country: Turkey
- Province: Elazığ
- District: Sivrice
- Population (2021): 24
- Time zone: UTC+3 (TRT)

Yaruşağı is a village in the Sivrice District of Elazığ Province in Turkey. The village is populated by Kurds of the Herdî tribe and had a population of 24 in 2021.

The hamlet of Tandoğan is attached to the village.
