= Görgülü, Sivrice =

Village in Elazığ Province, Turkey

Görgülü
- Village
- Location in Turkey
- Coordinates: 38.352°N 38.996°E
- Country: Turkey
- Province: Elazığ
- District: Sivrice
- Population (2021): 58
- Time zone: UTC+3 (TRT)

Görgülü (Kurdish: Cevlanî) is a village in the Sivrice District of Elazığ Province in Turkey. The village is populated by Kurds of the Herdî tribe and had a population of 58 in 2021.

The hamlets of Nenegölü and Örücü are attached to the village.
