= Gunay Mehdizade =

Azerbaijani painter (born 1981)

Gunay Zebic (Mehdizade) Günay Zebic (Mehdizadə)
- Born: 18 June 1981 (age 44); Baku, Azerbaijan SSR, USSR
- Website: Gunay Mehdizade - The Museum Center of the Ministry of Culture of the Azerbaijan Republic - About Gunay Mehdizade

Gunay Zebic (Mehdizade) (Azerbaijani: Günay Mehdizadə; born June 18, 1981, in Baku city) is an Azerbaijani painter and a member of the Union of Artists of Azerbaijan, artist of Turkey and Azerbaijan, author and organizer of the project of the Art Gymnasium within the Bursa Zaki Muren Fine Arts Lyceum and Azerbaijan National Conservatory. She is also the author and organizer of Bursa Zeki Müren Fine Arts Lyceum and "Brother School" project of the Art Gymnasium within the National Conservatory of Azerbaijan, and the author of a portrait of Atatürk, exhibited at the House-Museum of Atatürk in Ankara.

== Biography ==
Gunay Israil gizi Mehdizade was born on June 18, 1981, in Baku city. In 2002, she studied computer programming.

Sara Oghuz Khanum Nazirova, the Azerbaijani writer-publicist, and journalist, head of the prose department of "Azerbaijan" magazine, screenwriter of several films, played an important role in her orientation towards painting. Gunay Mehdizade received about 8 years of special education from two great artists such as Beyimkhanim Hajizade, the Honored Artist of Azerbaijan, and Asgar Asgarov, a member of the Union of Artists of the USSR and Azerbaijan. The education she received in this direction and the works she created greatly contributed to her professionalism. Today, Gunay Mehdizade is officially considered an artist of Turkey and Azerbaijan. The artist's works are protected by the Copyright of the Republic of Azerbaijan.

Since 2011 she has been a member of the Union of Artists of Azerbaijan. In 2012, Gunay Mehdizade's "National Dishes" work was registered in the World Children's Encyclopedia. The artist’s work “Novruz” completed in 2012, was included in the book "History and Personality in Fine Art of Azerbaijan".

Gunay Mehdizade, who won the international competition in 2013, represented Azerbaijan at the 4th International Symposium on International Live Drawing Symposium in Turkey in 2014.

In 2013, her works were well received by the audience at the exhibition of young Azerbaijani artists held in Milan (Italy). The work "Pomegranate", created in 2014 at the symposium, is exhibited at the Modern Museum of Konya.

Since 2015, the work "Portrait of Atatürk" has been exhibited in the Atatürk House Museum in Ankara and is valued as a treasure of the Republic of Turkey.

In May 2017, she represented culture, art, and brotherhood of the two countries (Azerbaijan and Turkey) by joining the "Brotherhood of Colors" project, under the cooperation of Izmir Balçova Municipality and Fraternity Cooperation Association under the organization of Baku Yunus Emre Institute as an artist-curator.

In 2016-2017, Gunay Mehdizade worked especially on historical works. During the 25th anniversary of independence of Azerbaijan, she created a portrait of Heydar Aliyev. Later, she created the works such as "Atatürk Period", "Modern Turkey", and "Khojaly genocide".

In July 2018, a three-day conference of the Copyright Confederation of Eurasian Countries was held in Moscow, and Gunay Mehdizade represented Azerbaijan.

On March 6, 2019, Gunay Mehdizade's second style exhibition was held with the initiative of "The Fairmont Hotel".

On April 23, 2019, the 14th International Interschool Theater Festival was organized by Gunay Mehdizade, who was the head of the project, developer, and decorator for Azerbaijan.

On June 11, 2020, with the support of the State Committee for Refugees and Internally Displaced Persons of the Republic of Azerbaijan, and the coordination of the well-known artist Gunay Zebic, the "We Are Stronger Together!" event, dedicated to the fight against the coronavirus (COVID-19) pandemic, was held in the "Khari Bulbul" Training and Production Union in the "Gobu Park-3" residential complex in the Garadagh district of Baku.

In 2021, in Baku, as the project manager, screenwriter, decorator, and idea author of character costumes, Gunay Zebich (Mehdizade) staged a theater play called "From Nizami to Yunus: Seeing with Unity,” introducing the two great poets of Turkey and Azerbaijan to the public. On May 7, it was staged in the International Mugham Center without an audience.

In 2022, the work "Zefir" authored by Drago Shtambuk included a section dedicated to G. Mehdizade called "A new attitude to the ancient artistic tradition". In that section, Drago Shtambuk evaluates Gunay Mehdizade's creativity as follows:

Today, when contemporary artistic processes are rooted in a very contrasting direction and an evident competition of creators for appearing "modern" has harmed our national artistic values, there are also examples of art that live as the opposite of all these. This new and unique artistic ability that we have highlighted can be seen in various themes and genres in the works of the young artist Gunay Mehdizade. First, after her painting plates were displayed in various exhibitions, and then after my personal acquaintance with her, I was convinced that a young artist who wanted to show a unique artistic attitude to our old national values appeared in our painting space.

— Mehdizadə, Günay. Qədim bədii ənənəyə yeni münasibət // Draqo Ştambuk. Zefir. Bakı: Şərq-Qərb, 2022, s. 400-414

In the first week of December 2023, a solo exhibition called "Independence" was held in the "City Museum Complex" exhibition hall under the organization of the Eskişehir Metropolitan Municipality. The exhibition was dedicated to the 100th anniversary of the Republic of Turkey. In addition to works depicting the youth, military life, and leadership of the founder and first leader of the Republic of Turkey, Mustafa Kemal Atatürk, works dedicated to the 100th anniversary of the birth of Heydar Aliyev, who led Azerbaijan in 1993-2003, were also presented.

Currently, Gunay Mehdizade is acting as the author and organizer of the "Brothers School" project of Art Gymnasium within Bursa Zeki Müren Fine Arts Lyceum and Azerbaijan National Conservatory, chief curator of cultural relations project between Azerbaijan and Turkey. She is also acting as the chief curator of the project, which is considered significant for the development of cultural relations between the two states.

Married.

== Awards and prizes ==
- In 2017, she was awarded a letter of appreciation by Ibrahim Yıldırım, the director of Baku Yunus Emre Institute, for her contribution as a project curator in the "Brotherhood of Colors" project organized in Izmir from May 28 to June 1, 2017.
- Mudahya District Director of National Education Suat Topal awarded her with a letter of appreciation for her services in the development of Turkish-Azerbaijani fraternal relations.
- On February 15, 2018, she was awarded for her irreplaceable services in the promotion of culture and education in the Turkish, as well as for her contributions to the development of interstate educational and cultural relations, as the author and chief curator of the "Brother School" project of the Art Gymnasium within the Bursa Zaki Muren Fine Arts Lyceum and Azerbaijan National Conservatory.
- On May 5, 2019, for participation in the 14th International Interschool Theater Festival, she was awarded with a letter of appreciation by Memduh Büyükkılıç, head of Kayseri Metropolitan Municipality.
- She was awarded the honorary title "Azerbaijani Woman's Award" in 2020 for her highest achievements in the past 3 years.
- In 2021, she was thanked by Selchuk Karakılıç, director of the Baku Yunus Emre Institute, for her contribution as a screenwriter and director in the theater play "From Nizami to Yunus: Seeing with Unity," dedicated to Yunus Emre and Nizami Ganjavi.
- On February 25, 2022, she was awarded a diploma by the Union of Artists of Azerbaijan and the Khatai Art Center for the curation and social activity of the individual exhibition "Names."
- In June 2022, she was awarded a letter of appreciation by the Ambassador of India to Azerbaijan B. Vanlalvavna for contribution to strengthening the friendship between India and Azerbaijan through art.

== Reflection of the artist's activity in the press ==
1. Əliyev Z. Müasir bədii baxış milli ənənələrə söykənəndə. Ulduz qəzeti, 2014, sentyabr, s.67–70.
2. Rəsm əsərimin Ankarada Atatürkün ev muzeyində sərgilənməsi qürurverici duyğudur. Müsahibəni apardı: F. Hüseynzadə. Palitra, 2016, 18 iyun, s.7.
3. Əliyev Z. Rəssam Günay Mehdizadənin qədim ənənəyə müasir münasibəti. "Kaspi" qəz., 2017, 25–27 noyabr, s.24.
4. Miniatürün gəncliyi: Rəssam Günay Mehdizadənin qədim ənənəyə müasir münasibəti haqqında. Kaspi qəzeti, 2017, 25–27 noyabr, s. 24
5. Əliyev Z. Azərbaycanlı rəssamın əsəri "Atatürk evi"ni bəzəyir. Mədəniyyət qəzeti, 2015, 24 iyun, s.13
6. Əliyev Z. Gənc rəssamın uğurlu axtarışları. 525-ci qəzet, 2014, 23 avqust, s. 18.
7. Günay Mehdizadə: "Canlı rəsm simpoziumları multikultural mədəni dəyərlərin vəhdəti üçün olduqca uğurludur" Müsahibəni apardı: F. Hüseynzadə. Palitra, 2016, 18 iyun, s.7.
8. Əsəri Türkiyə Cümhuriyyətinin sərvəti olan rəssam. Müsahibəni apardı: X. Rəis. Kaspi, 2018, 22 fevral, s.14
9. Əliyev Z. Günay Mehdizadənin Konya uğuru. Palitra qəzeti, 2014, 10 iyun, s.13.
10. Renklerin Kardeşliği" sergisi açıldı. Hurriyet qazetesi, 2017, 2 haziran
