= Sivrice =

- Municipality
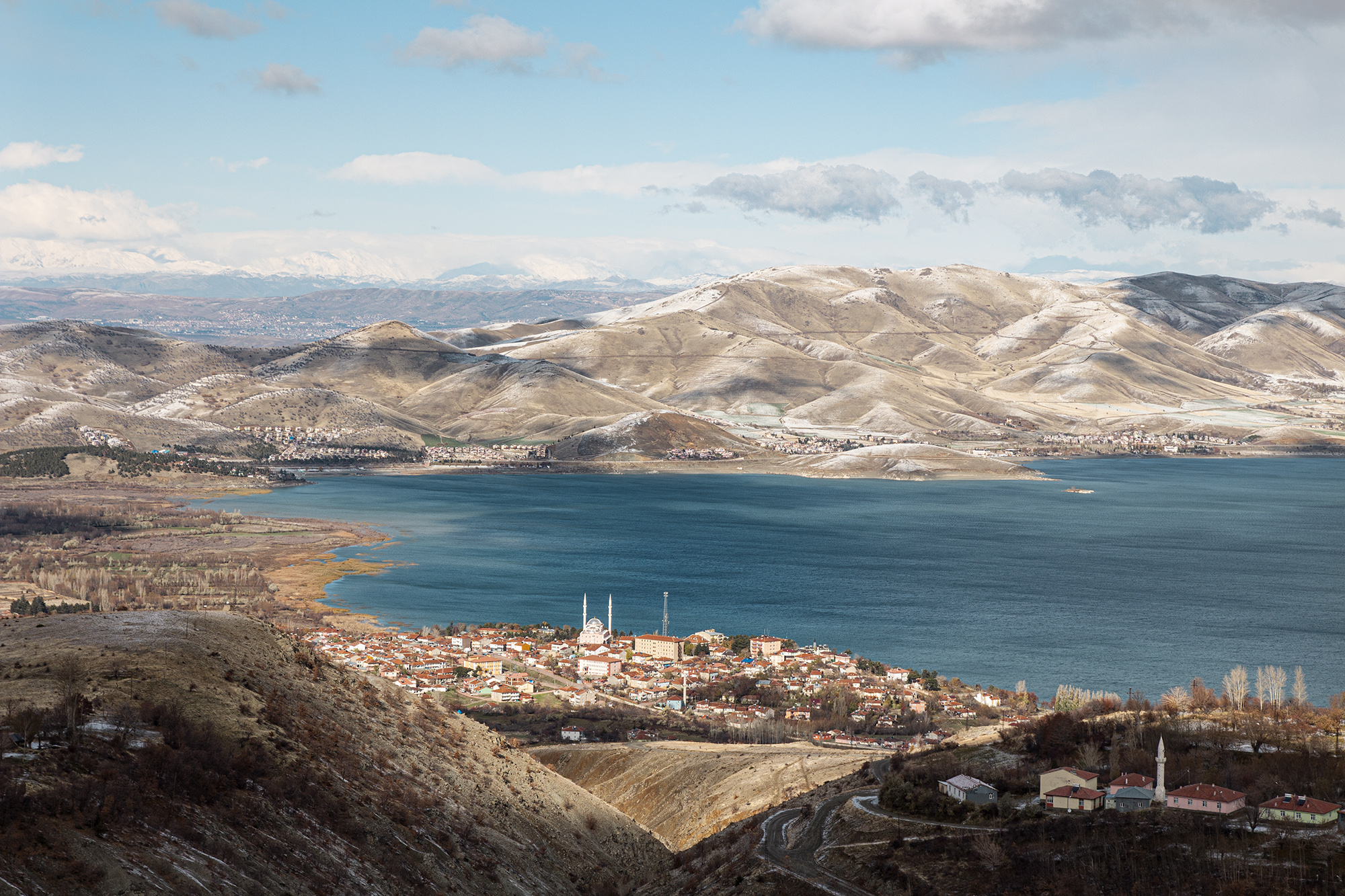
- Sivrice and Lake Hazar seen from Hazar Baba Mountain.

- Location within Turkey
- Coordinates: 38°26′48″N 39°18′42″E
- Country: Turkey
- Province: Elazığ
- District: Sivrice

Government
  - Mayor: Ebubekir Irmak (AKP)
- Population (2021): 3,645
- Time zone: UTC+3 (TRT)
- Website: www.sivrice.bel.tr

Sivrice (Kurdish: Xox), is a town of Elazığ Province of Turkey. It is the seat of Sivrice District. Sivrice is on the shore of Lake Hazar. Its population is 3,645 (2021).

Kurds of the Şadiyan tribe are present in the town.

== History ==
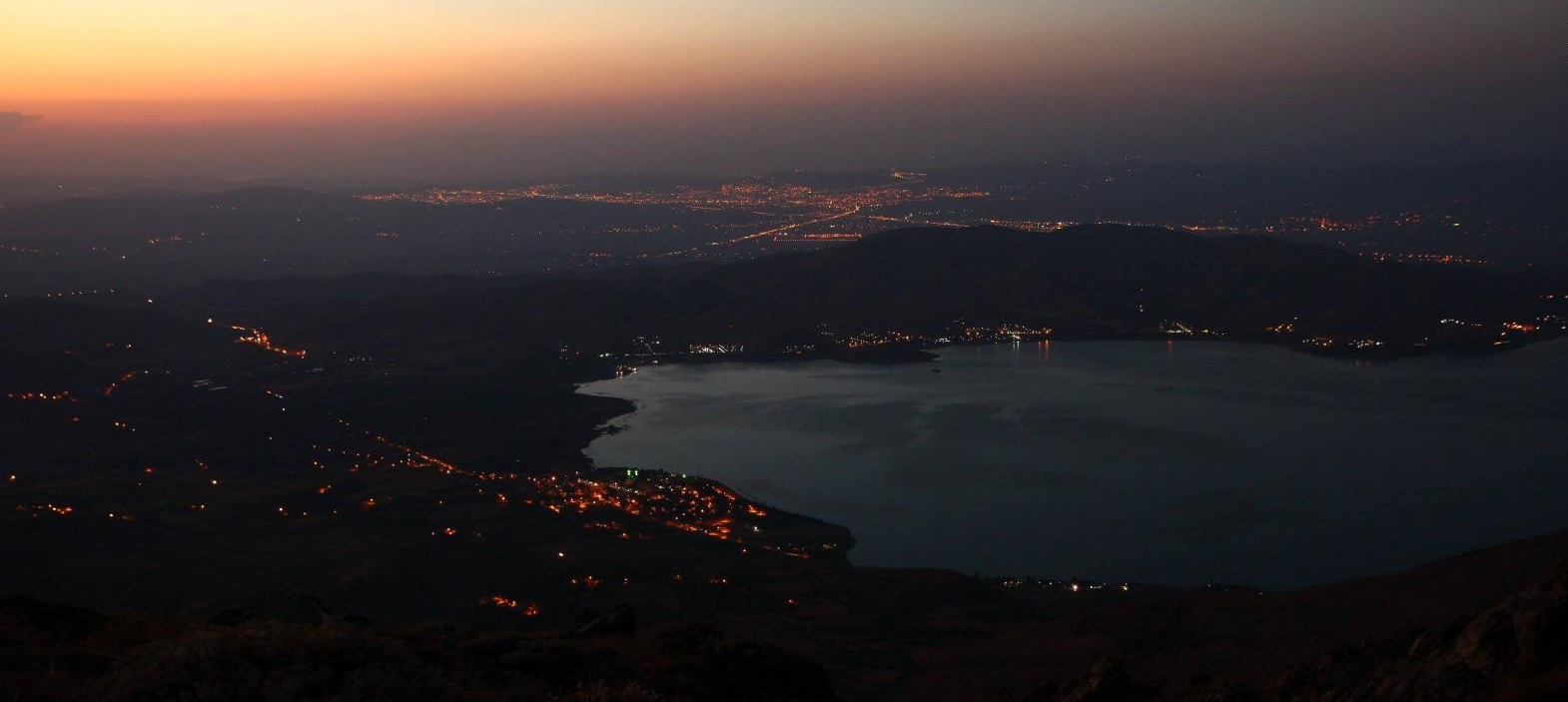
Sivrice in the evening

On 24 January 2020 the town was impacted by a magnitude 6.7 earthquake.

In 2025, archaeologists uncovered a Byzantine mosaic floor featuring geometric and interlaced designs, such as wave, cross, and infinity patterns. The mosaic also bears a Greek inscription reading "Tittos Domestikos". The name Tittos likely refers to an individual, while Domestikos is recognized in Byzantine texts as a military or ecclesiastical title. This indicates that the structure may have been associated with a local official or administrator.
