= Akbuğday, Sivrice =

Village in Turkey

Akbuğday
- Village
- Location in Turkey
- Coordinates: 38°25′48″N 39°25′11″E
- Country: Turkey
- Province: Elazığ
- District: Sivrice
- Population (2021): 283
- Time zone: UTC+3 (TRT)

Akbuğday is a village in the Sivrice District of Elazığ Province in Turkey. Its population is 283 (2021). The residents speak Kurdish or Zaza.
