= Bash Qeshlaq, Kurdistan =

Bash Qeshlaq باش قشلاق
- Village
- Location within Iran
- Coordinates: 36°07′34″N 47°03′44″E
- Country: Iran
- Province: Kurdistan
- County: Divandarreh
- Bakhsh: Karaftu
- Rural District: Kani Shirin

Population (2006)
  - Total: 284
- Time zone: UTC+3:30 (IRST)
  - Summer (DST): UTC+4:30 (IRDT)

Bash Qeshlaq (Persian: باش قشلاق, also Romanized as Bāsh Qeshlāq and Bāshqeshlāq) is a village in Kani Shirin Rural District, Karaftu District, Divandarreh County, Kurdistan Province, Iran. At the 2006 census, its population was 284, in 58 families. The village is populated by Kurds.
