= Gunay, Iran =

Village in Zanjan province, Iran

Gunay Persian: گوناي
- Village
- Location within Iran
- Coordinates: 35°50′11″N 48°02′53″E
- Country: Iran
- Province: Zanjan
- County: Khodabandeh
- District: Afshar
- Rural District: Shivanat

Population (2016)
  - Total: 151
- Time zone: UTC+3:30 (IRST)

Gunay (Persian: گوناي) (Note: Also romanized as Goonay, Gūnāī, Gūnāy, and Gūney) is a village in Shivanat Rural District of Afshar District in Khodabandeh County, Zanjan province, Iran.

== Demographics ==
=== Population ===
At the time of the 2006 National Census, the village's population was 188 in 45 households. The following census in 2011 counted 164 people in 47 households. The 2016 census measured the population of the village as 151 people in 47 households.
