= Günay, Sivrice =

Village in Turkey

Günay
- Village
- Location in Turkey
- Coordinates: 38.500°N 39.321°E
- Country: Turkey
- Province: Elazığ
- District: Sivrice
- Population (2021): 64
- Time zone: UTC+3 (TRT)

Günay (also: Güneyköy) is a village in the Sivrice District of Elazığ Province in Turkey. The village is populated by Turks. Its population is 64 (2021).
