= Towhidlu, Markazi =

Towhidlu توحيدلو
- Village
- Location within Iran
- Coordinates: 35°05′48″N 49°36′28″E
- Country: Iran
- Province: Markazi
- County: Saveh
- Bakhsh: Nowbaran
- Rural District: Bayat

Population (2006)
  - Total: 120
- Time zone: UTC+3:30 (IRST)
  - Summer (DST): UTC+4:30 (IRDT)

Towhidlu (Persian: توحيدلو, also Romanized as Towḩīdlū; also known as Tohāndlu) is a village in Bayat Rural District, Nowbaran District, Saveh County, Markazi Province, Iran. At the 2006 census, its population was 120, in 29 families.
