= Muhacir =

Ottoman Muslims who immigrated to Anatolia

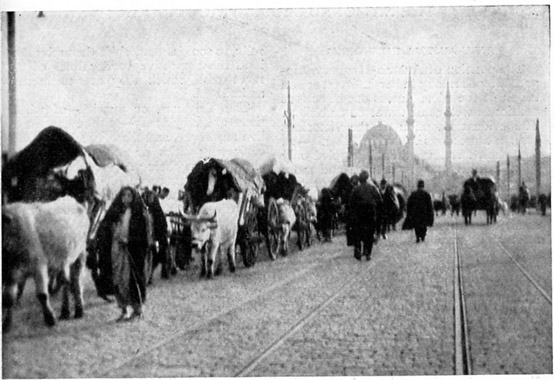
Muhacirs arriving in Istanbul crossing the Galata Bridge, Ottoman Empire, in 1912, with the New Mosque in the background

Muhacir is a term referring to Ottoman Muslim citizens and their descendants born after the onset of the dissolution of the Ottoman Empire. Muhacirs overwhelmingly self-identified as Muslims and their numbers are estimated in the millions. The refugees from North Macedonia, Bulgaria, and parts of Serbia and Romania had primarily Anatolian Turkish background. Other backgrounds included Albanians, Bosniaks, Chechens, Circassians, Crimean Tatars, Pomaks, Macedonian Muslims, Greek Muslims, Serb Muslims, Georgian Muslims, Ossetian Muslims and Muslim Roma.

They immigrated to modern-day Turkey, mostly in the 19th and early 20th centuries to escape the persecution of Ottoman Muslims by Christians in territories formerly controlled by the Ottoman Empire. Further migration from Bulgaria occurred from 1940 to 1990. Up to a third of the modern-day population of Turkey may have ancestry from these Turkish and other Muslim migrants.

== Muhacir immigration to Turkey ==
Approximately 5-7 million Muslim migrants arrived in Ottoman Anatolia and modern Turkey from 1783 to 2016 from the Balkans (Bulgaria, 1.15-1.5 million; Greece, 1.2 million; Romania, 400,000; Yugoslavia, 800,000; Russia, 500,000; the Caucasus, 900,000, of whom two-thirds remained, the rest going to Syria, Jordan and Cyprus; and Syria, 500,000, mostly as a result of the Syrian Civil War in 2011). Of these, 4 million came by 1924; 1.3 million, post-1934 to 1945; and more than 1.2 million, before the outbreak of the Syrian Civil War.

The influx of Muhacir migration during the late 19th and early 20th centuries was caused by the loss of almost all Ottoman territory in Europe during the Balkan War of 1912-13 and the First World War. These refugees viewed the Ottoman Empire, and subsequently the Republic of Turkey, as a protective "motherland". Many Muhacirs escaped to Anatolia as a result of the widespread persecution of Ottoman Muslims by Christians during the last years of the Ottoman Empire.

Thereafter, with the establishment of the Republic of Turkey in 1923, a large influx of Turks, as well as other Muslims, from the Balkans, the Black Sea, the Caucasus, the Aegean islands, Cyprus, the Sanjak of Alexandretta (İskenderun), the Middle East, and the Soviet Union continued to arrive in the region, settling mostly in urban north-western Anatolia. During the Circassian genocide, 800,000–1,500,000 Muslim Circassians were systematically mass-murdered, ethnically cleansed, and expelled from Circassia in the aftermath of the Russo-Circassian War (1763–1864). In 1923, more than half a million ethnic Muslims of various nationalities arrived from Greece as part of the population exchange between Greece and Turkey—an exchange based not on ethnicity but religious affiliation.

After 1925, Turkey continued to accept Turkic-speaking Muslims as immigrants and did not discourage the immigration of members of non-Turkic minorities. More than 90 percent of all immigrants arrived from Balkan countries. From 1934 to 1945, 229,870 refugees and immigrants came to Turkey.

From the 1930s to 2016, migration added two million Muslims in Turkey. The majority of these were Balkan Turks who faced harassment and discrimination. New waves of Turks and other Muslims expelled from Bulgaria and Yugoslavia between 1951 and 1953 were followed to Turkey by another exodus from Bulgaria in 1983–89, bringing the total immigration figures to nearly 10 million people.

More recently, Meskhetian Turks have immigrated to Turkey from former Soviet Union states (particularly Ukraine after the annexation of Crimea by the Russian Federation in 2014); and many Iraqi Turkmen and Syrian Turkmen took refuge in Turkey due to the Iraq War (2003–2011) and the Syrian Civil War (2011–2024). Although more than 3.7 million Syrians migrated to Turkey since the Syrian Civil War, the classification of Syrian refugees as Muhacirs has been described as controversial and politically charged.

== Muhacir emigration by country or region ==
In this section, each Muhacir emigration will be looked at according to the place from which it originated.

=== Algeria ===
Initially, the first wave of Muhacir emigration occurred in 1830, when many Algerian Turks were forced to leave the region following the French conquest of Algeria. Approximately 10,000 Turks were relocated to Smyrna (currently Izmir) in Turkey, whilst many others also migrated to Palestine, Syria, Arabia, and Egypt.

=== Bulgaria ===
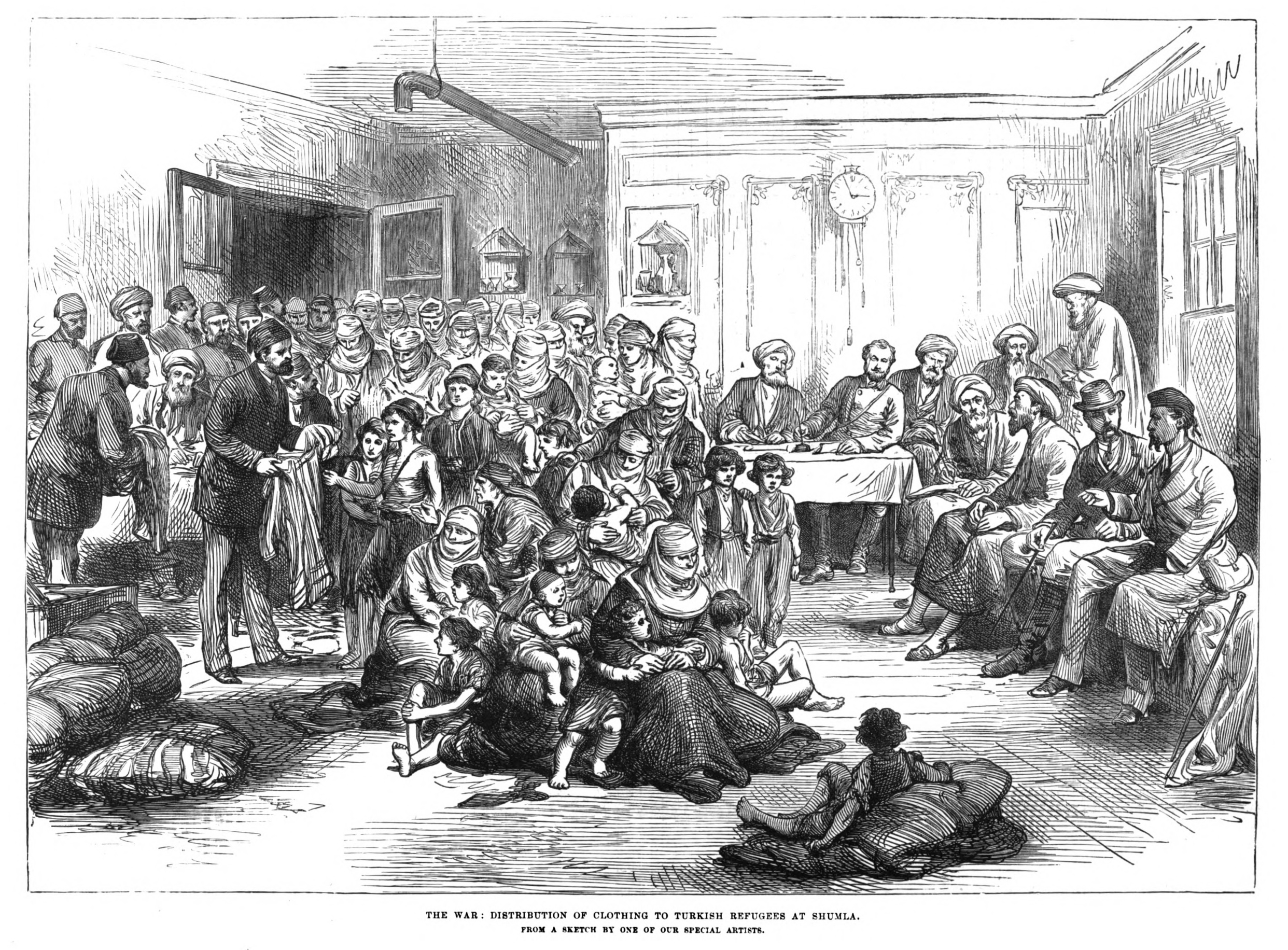
Distribution of clothing to Turkish refugees at Shumla, 1877

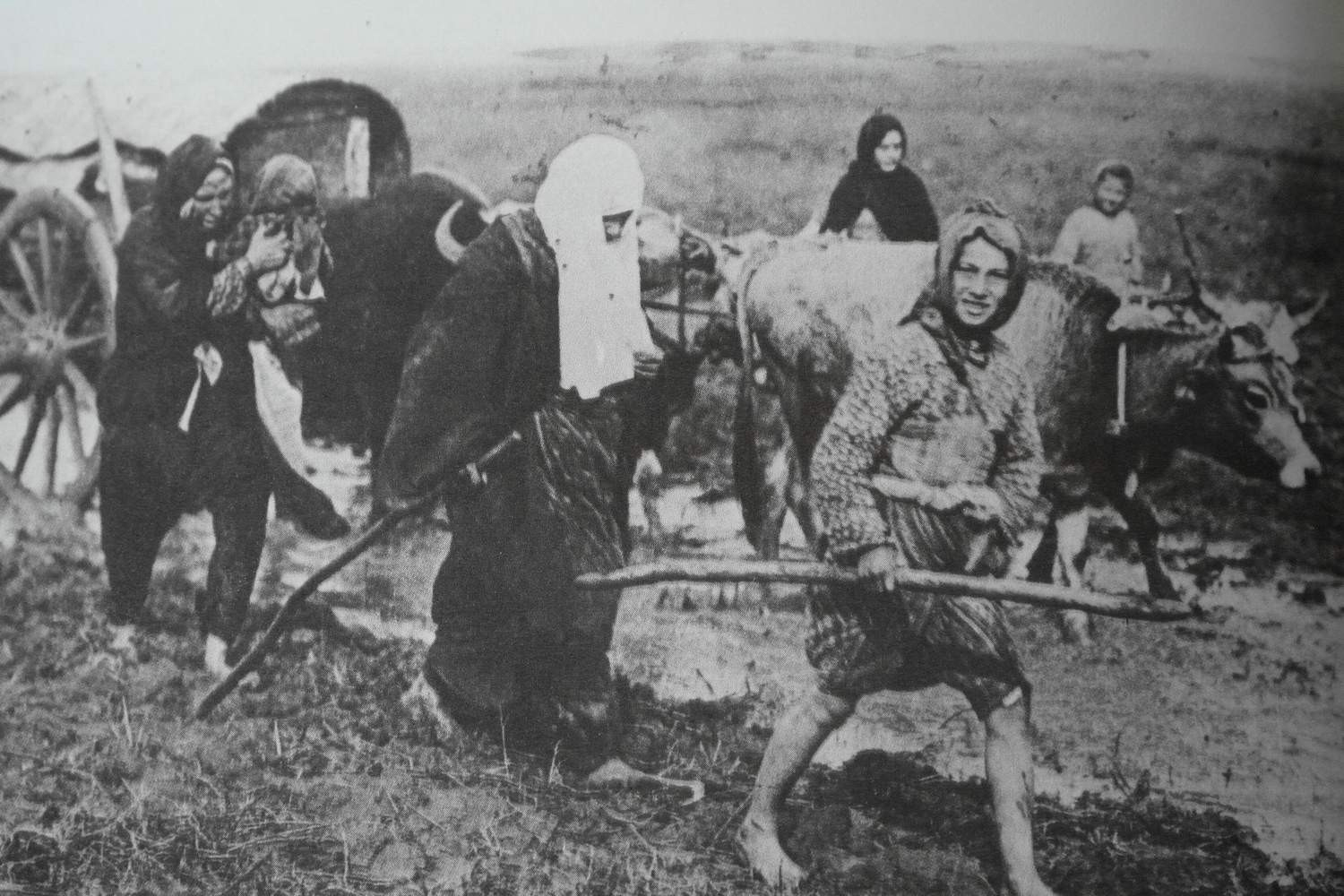
Turkish immigrants from Bulgaria arriving in Anatolia in 1912

Turkish migrations from Bulgaria, 1878-1992
Years	Number
1878-1912	350,000
1923-33	101,507
1934-39	97,181
1940-49	21,353
1950-51	154,198
1952-68	24
1969-78	114,356
1979-88	0
1989-92	321,800
Total	1,160,614

The first wave of Muhacir emigration from Bulgaria occurred during the Russo-Turkish War (1828–1829), when around 30,000 Bulgarian Turks arrived in Turkey. The second wave of about 750,000 emigrants left Bulgaria during the Russo-Turkish War of 1877-78, but approximately one-fourth of them died on the way. More than 200,000 of the rest remained inside the present borders of Turkey, whilst the others were sent to other parts of the Ottoman Empire. The aftermath of the war led to major demographic restructuring of Bulgaria's ethnic and religious make-up.

As a result of these emigrations, the percentage of Turks in Bulgaria was reduced from more than one-third of the population immediately after the Russo-Turkish War to 14.2% in 1900. Substantial numbers of Turks continued to emigrate to Turkey during and following the Balkan Wars and the First World War, in accordance with compulsory exchange of population agreements between Greece, Bulgaria, and Turkey. By 1934 the Turkish community had been reduced to 9.7% of Bulgaria's total population and continued to fall during the subsequent decades.

Communist rule after the Second World War ended most emigration from Bulgaria, but further bilateral agreements were negotiated in the early 1950s and late 1960s to regulate the outflow of Bulgarian Turks. Heavy taxation, nationalisation of private minority schools, and measures against Turkish culture in the name of the modernisation of Bulgaria, built up great pressure for the Turkish minority to emigrate; and, when exit restrictions were relaxed in 1950, many ethnic Turks applied to leave. In August 1950, the Bulgarian government announced that 250,000 ethnic Turks had made applications to emigrate and pressured Turkey to accept them within three months. However, the Turkish authorities declared that the country could not accept these numbers in such a short time and closed its borders over the following year.

In what was tantamount to expulsion, pressure for ethnic Turks to leave continued and by late 1951 some 155,000 Turks left Bulgaria. Most had abandoned their property or sold it well below its value, resettling successfully primarily in the Marmara and Aegean regions of Turkey, helped by the distribution of land and the provision of housing. In 1968 another agreement was reached between the two countries, which allowed the departure of relatives of those who had left up to 1951 to unite with their divided families; and another 115,000 people left Bulgaria for Turkey between 1968 and 1978.

The latest wave of Turkish emigration began with an exodus in 1989, known as the "big excursion", when the Bulgarian Turks fled to Turkey in order to escape a campaign of forced assimilation. This marked a dramatic culmination of years of tension in the Turkish community, which began with the Bulgarian government's assimilation campaign to ban the wearing of traditional Turkish dress and speaking Turkish in public places, then intensified in the winter of 1985 to make ethnic Turks change their names to Bulgarian Slavic ones.

By May 1989, the Bulgarian authorities began to expel the Turks; when the Turkish government's efforts to negotiate with Bulgaria for an orderly migration failed, Turkey opened its borders to Bulgaria on 2 June 1989. However, on 21 August of that year, Turkey reintroduced immigration visa requirements for Bulgarian Turks. It was estimated that about 360,000 ethnic Turks had left for Turkey, though more than one-third subsequently returned to Bulgaria once the ban on Turkish names was revoked in December 1989.

Nonetheless, once the Bulgarian communist regime fell and Bulgarian citizens were allowed freedom of travel again, some 218,000 Bulgarians left the country for Turkey. The subsequent emigration wave was prompted by continuously deteriorating economic conditions; furthermore, the first democratic elections in 1990 won by the renamed communist party resulted in the departure of 88,000 people, once again mostly Bulgarian Turks, from the country. By 1992, emigration to Turkey resumed at a greater rate—this time, however, pushed by economic reasons because of Bulgaria's economic decline in ethnically mixed regions. Bulgarian Turks were left without state subsidies or other forms of state assistance and experienced an especially deep recession. According to the 1992 census, some 344,849 Bulgarians of Turkish origin had migrated to Turkey between 1989 and 1992, resulting in significant demographic decline in southern Bulgaria.

=== Caucasus ===
The events of the Circassian Genocide—namely, the ethnic cleansing, killing, forced migration, and expulsion of the majority of the Circassians from the Caucasus—resulted in the deaths of approximately at least 600,000 Caucasian natives and up to 1,500,000 deaths, and the successful migration of the remaining of 900,000–1,500,000 Caucasians who immigrated to the Ottoman Empire due to intermittent Russian attacks from 1768 to 1917. In the 1860s and 1870s, the Ottoman government settled Circassians in territories of modern-day Turkey, Syria, Jordan, Lebanon, Israel, Iraq, Georgia, Bulgaria, Romania, Serbia, Kosovo, Greece, Cyprus, and North Macedonia. Today, there are up to 7,000,000 people of Circassian descent living in Turkey and presumably more with Circassian descent because it has been hard to differentiate among ethnic groups in Turkey.

=== Crimea ===
From 1771 until the beginning of the 19th century, approximately 500,000 Crimean Tatars arrived in Anatolia.

Russian officials usually posited a shared religious identity between Turks and Tatars as the primary driving force behind the Tatar migrations. They reasoned that Muslim Tatars would not want to live in Orthodox Russia, which had annexed Crimea before the 1792 Treaty of Jassy. With this treaty began an exodus of Nogai Tatars to the Ottoman Empire.

Prior to the annexation, the Tatar nobility (mizra) could not make the peasants a serf class, which had allowed the Tatar peasants relative freedom compared to other parts of Eastern Europe, and they were permitted use of all "wild and untilled" lands for cultivation. Under the "wild lands" rules, Crimea had expanded its agricultural lands as farmers cultivated previously untilled lands. Many aspects of land ownership and the relationship between the mizra and the peasants were governed under Islamic law. After the annexation, many of the communal lands of the Crimean Tatars were confiscated by Russians, and the migrations to the Ottoman Empire began when their hopes of Ottoman victory were dashed at the close of the Russo-Turkish War of 1787-1792.

=== Cyprus ===
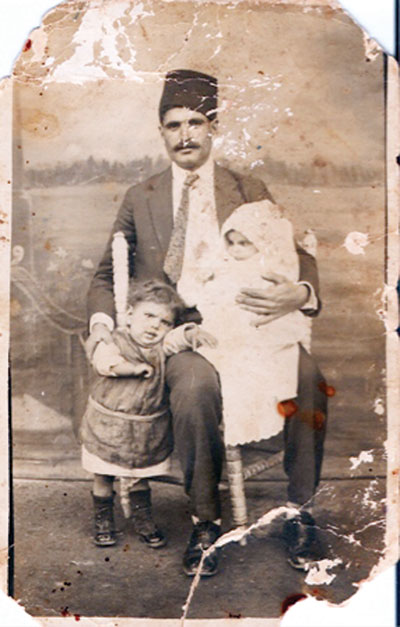
A Turkish Cypriot family who migrated to Turkey in 1935

The first wave of emigration from Cyprus to Turkey occurred in 1878 when the Ottomans were obliged to lease the island to Great Britain, at which time 15,000 Turkish Cypriots moved to Anatolia. The flow of Turkish Cypriot emigration to Turkey continued in the aftermath of the First World War, gaining its greatest velocity in the mid-1920s and continuing at fluctuating speeds during the Second World War. Turkish Cypriot migration has continued since the Cyprus conflict.

Economic motives played an important part in the Turkish Cypriot migration wave, as conditions for the poor in Cyprus were especially harsh during the 1920s. Enthusiasm to emigrate to Turkey was inflated by the euphoria that greeted the birth of the newly established Republic of Turkey and later of promises of assistance to Turks who immigrated. A decision taken by the Turkish Government at the end of 1925, for instance, noted that the Turks of Cyprus had, according to the Treaty of Lausanne, the right to emigrate to the republic; and therefore, families that so emigrated would be given a house and sufficient land. The precise number of those who emigrated to Turkey remains unknown. The Turkish press reported in mid-1927 that of those who had opted for Turkish nationality, 5,000–6,000 Turkish Cypriots had already settled in Turkey. However, many Turkish Cypriots had already emigrated even before the rights accorded to them under the Treaty of Lausanne had come into force.

In an attempt by St. John-Jones to accurately estimate the true demographic impact of Turkish Cypriot immigration to Turkey between 1881 and 1931, he supposed that:

[I]f the Turkish-Cypriot community had, like the Greek-Cypriots, increased by 101 per cent between 1881 and 1931, it would have totalled 91,300 in 1931 – 27,000 more than the number enumerated. Is it possible that so many Turkish-Cypriots emigrated in the fifty-year period? Taken together, the considerations just mentioned suggest that it probably was. From a base of 45,000 in 1881, emigration of anything like 27,000 persons seems huge, but after subtracting the known 5,000 of the 1920s, the balance represents an average annual outflow of some 500 – not enough, probably, to concern the community’s leaders, evoke official comment, or be documented in any way which survives today.

According to Ali Suat Bilge, taking into consideration the mass migrations of 1878, the First World War, the 1920s early Turkish Republican era, and the Second World War, overall, a total of approximately 100,000 Turkish Cypriots had left the island for Turkey between 1878 and 1945. By 31 August 31, 1955, a statement by Turkey's Minister of State and Acting Foreign Minister, Fatin Rüştü Zorlu, at the London Conference on Cyprus said that:

Consequently, today [1955] as well, when we take into account the state of the population in Cyprus, it is not sufficient to say, for instance, that 100,000 Turks live there. One should rather say that 100,000 out of 24,000,000 Turks live there and that 300,000 Turkish Cypriots live in various parts of Turkey.

By 2001 the Turkish Republic of Northern Cyprus Ministry of Foreign Affairs estimated that 500,000 Turkish Cypriots were living in Turkey.

=== Greece ===
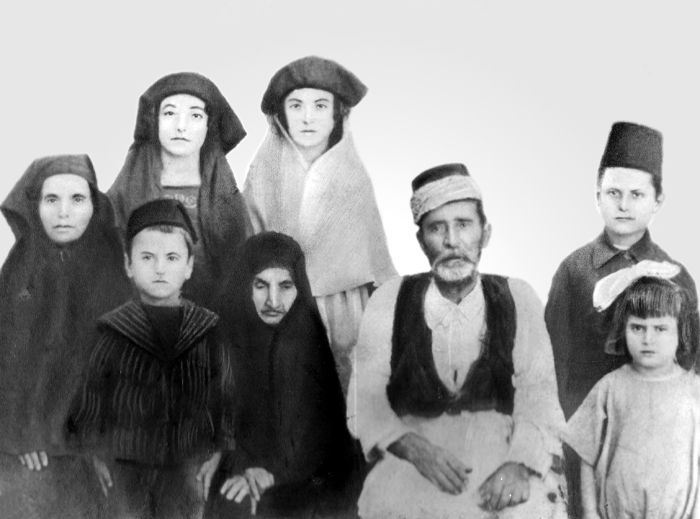
A Muslim family from Crete who settled in Smyrna (currently Izmir), 1923

The immigration of the Turks from Greece to Turkey started in the early 1820s upon the establishment of an independent Greece in 1829. By the end of the First World War, approximately 800,000 Turks had emigrated to Turkey from Greece. Then, in accordance with the 1923 Treaty of Lausanne, under the 1923 Convention Concerning the Exchange of Greek and Turkish Populations, Greece and Turkey agreed to the compulsory exchange of ethnic populations. The term Mübadil (exchange) was used to refer specifically to this migration.

Between 350,000 and 500,000 Muslim Turks emigrated from Greece to Turkey, and about 1.3 million Orthodox Christian Greeks from Turkey moved to Greece. The terms "Greek" and "Turkish" were defined by religion rather than linguistically or culturally. According to Article 1 of the convention:

…[T]here shall take place a compulsory exchange of Turkish nationals of the Greek Orthodox religion established in Turkish territory, and of Greek nationals of the Muslim religion established in Greek territory. These persons shall not return to live in Turkey or Greece respectively without the authorization of the Turkish government or of the Greek government respectively.

An article published in The Times on December 5, 1923, stated that:

…This transfer of populations is made especially difficult by the fact that few if any of the Turks in Greece desire to leave and most of them will resort to every possible expedient to avoid being sent away. A thousand Turks who voluntarily emigrated from Crete to Smyrna have sent several deputations to the Greek government asking to be allowed to return. Groups of Turks from all parts of Greece have submitted petitions for exemption. A few weeks ago, a group of Turks from Crete came to Athens with a request that they be baptized into the Greek church and thus be entitled to consideration as Greeks. The government however declined to permit this evasion.

The only exclusions from the forced transfer were the Christians living in Constantinople (currently Istanbul) and the Turks of Western Thrace. The remaining Turks living in Greece have since continuously emigrated to Turkey, a process facilitated by Article 19 of the Greek Nationality Law that the Greek state has used to deny re-entry of Turks who leave the country, even for temporary periods, and deprived them of their citizenship. Since 1923, between 300,000 and 400,000 Turks of Western Thrace left the region, most of them went to Turkey.

=== Romania ===
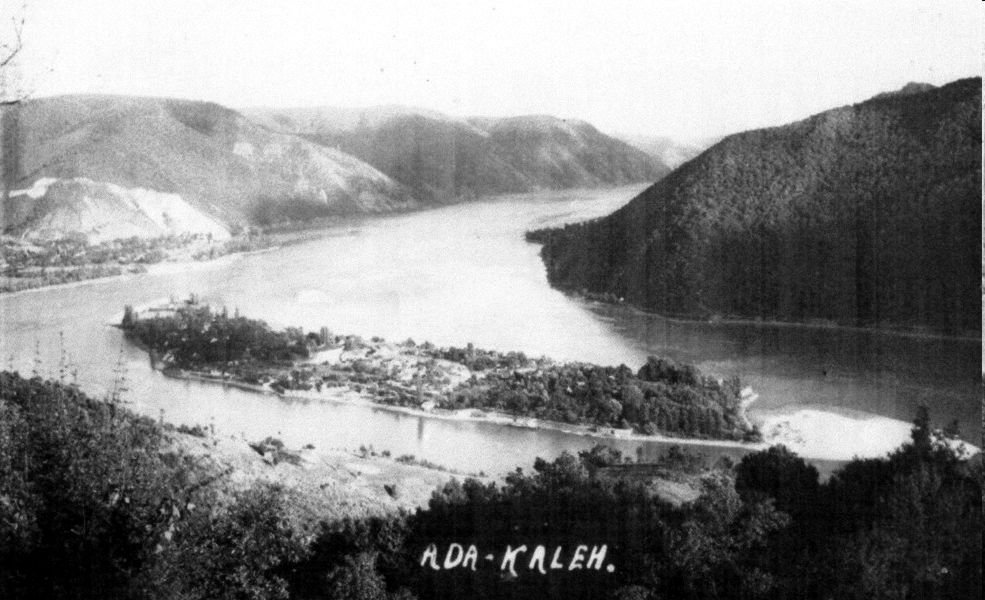
An Ottoman exclave until 1923, the island of Ada Kaleh was flooded by the building of the Iron Gates Dam in 1971, forcing its inhabitants to migrate to different parts of Romania as well as Turkey.

Emigration from Romania to Anatolia dates back to the early 1800s when Russian armies made advances into the region. During the Ottoman period, the greatest waves of emigration took place in 1826 when approximately 200,000 people arrived in Turkey, and then in 1878–1880 with 90,000 more. Following the Republican period, an agreement made on 4 September 1936, between Romania and Turkey allowed 70,000 Romanian Turks to leave the Dobruja region for Turkey. By the 1960s, inhabitants living in the Turkish exclave of Ada Kaleh were forced to leave the island when it was destroyed in order to build the Iron Gate I Hydroelectric Power Station, which caused the extinction of the local community through the migration of all its members to different parts of Romania and Turkey.

=== Serbia ===
In 1862 more than 10,000 Muslims, including Turks, were expelled from Serbia to Ottoman Bulgaria and Ottoman Bosnia.

=== Syria ===
In December 2016 the Turkish Foreign Ministry Undersecretary Ümit Yalçın stated that Turkey opened its borders to 500,000 Syrian Turkmen refugees fleeing the Syrian Civil War.

=== Yugoslavia ===
Emigration from Yugoslavia started in the 1800s as a consequence of the Serb revolution. Approximately 150,000 Muslims moved to Anatolia in 1826, and in 1867, a similar number. From 1862 to 1867, Muslim exiles from the Principality of Serbia settled in the Bosnia Vilayet. Upon the proclamation of the Republic of Turkey, 350,000 migrants arrived in Turkey between 1923 and 1930. An additional 160,000 others emigrated to Turkey after the establishment of Communist Yugoslavia from 1946 to 1961; and since 1961, emigrants from there have amounted to 50,000.

== See also ==
- Immigration to Turkey
- Late Ottoman genocides
- Misak-ı Millî
- Muhajirs (Albanians)
- Persecution of Ottoman Muslims
- Turkish minorities in the former Ottoman Empire
