= Afshar District =

District in Zanjan province, Iran

Afshar District Persian: بخش افشار
- District
- Location within Iran
- Coordinates: 35°56′N 48°09′E
- Country: Iran
- Province: Zanjan
- County: Khodabandeh
- Capital: Garmab

Population (2016)
  - Total: 12,424
- Time zone: UTC+3:30 (IRST)

Afshar District (Persian: بخش افشار) is in Khodabandeh County, Zanjan province, Iran. Its capital is the city of Garmab.

== Demographics ==
=== Ethnicity ===
The majority population is Azeri followed by Persians.

=== Population ===
At the time of the 2006 National Census, the district's population was 16,304 in 3,545 households. The following census in 2011 counted 15,303 people in 3,920 households. The 2016 census measured the population of the district as 12,424 inhabitants in 3,407 households.

=== Administrative divisions ===
Afshar District Population
Administrative Divisions	2006	2011	2016
Qeshlaqat-e Afshar RD	4,067	2,813	1,823
Shivanat RD	8,963	8,469	6,778
Garmab (city)	3,274	4,021	3,823
Total	16,304	15,303	12,424
RD = Rural District
