= List of populated places in Elazığ Province =

Places in Turkey

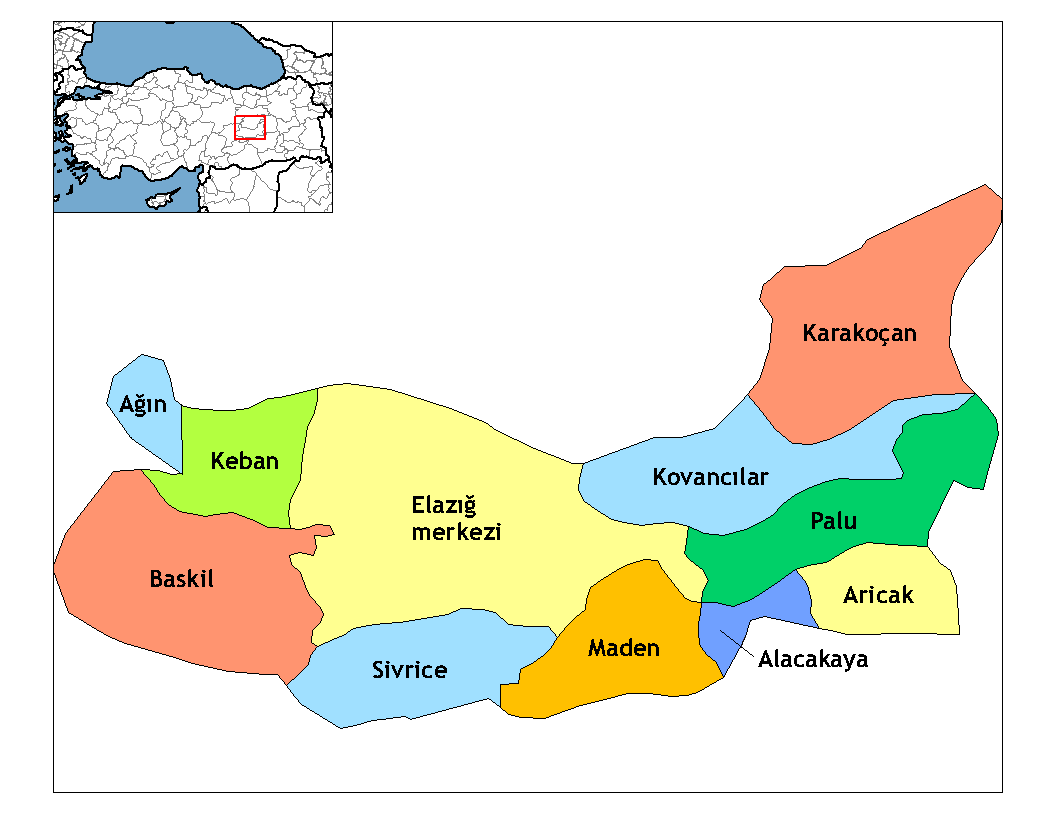
Elazığ Province

Below is the list of populated places in Elazığ Province, Turkey by districts.

== Elazığ (Merkez) ==
- Akçakiraz
- Elazığ
- Mollakendi
- Yazıkonak
- Yurtbaşı
- Acıpayam
- Akçakale
- Alaca
- Alatarla
- Alpağut
- Altınkuşak
- Arındık
- Aşağıdemirtaş
- Avcılı
- Aydıncık
- Aydınlar
- Badempınarı
- Bağdere
- Bağlarca
- Balıbey
- Ballıca
- Balpınar
- Beşikköy
- Beşoluk
- Beydalı
- Beydoğmuş
- Bölüklü
- Bulutlu
- Cevizdere
- Cipköy
- Çağlar
- Çalıca
- Çatalharman
- Çöteli
- Dallıca
- Dambüyük
- Dedepınarı
- Değirmenönü
- Dereboğazı
- Doğankuş
- Durupınar
- Elmapınarı
- Erbildi
- Esenkent
- Fatmalı
- Gedikyolu
- Gökçe
- Gölardı
- Gölköy
- Gözebaşı
- Gözpınar
- Gülpınar
- Gümüşbağlar
- Günaçtı
- Günbağı
- Güneyçayırı
- Güzelyalı
- Hal
- Hankendi
- Harmantepe
- Hıdırbaba
- Hoşköy
- Işıkyolu
- İçme
- İkitepe
- Kalkantepe
- Kaplıkaya
- Karaali
- Karaçavuş
- Karasaz
- Karataş
- Kavakpınar
- Kavaktepe
- Kelmahmut
- Kepektaş
- Kıraçköy
- Koçharmanı
- Koçkale
- Konakalmaz
- Koparuşağı
- Korucu
- Koruköy
- Kozluk
- Körpe
- Kumla
- Kurtdere
- Kuşhane
- Kuşluyazı
- Kuyulu
- Küllük
- Meşeli
- Muratçık
- Nuralı
- Obuz
- Ortaçalı
- Oymaağaç
- Öksüzuşağı
- Örençay
- Pelteköy
- Pirinççi
- Poyraz
- Sakabaşı
- Salkaya
- Sancaklı
- Sarıbük
- Sarıçubuk
- Sarıgül
- Sarıkamış
- Sarılı
- Sarıyakup
- Sedeftepe
- Serince
- Sinanköy
- Sultanuşağı
- Sünköy
- Sütlüce
- Şabanlı
- Şahaplı
- Şehsuvar
- Şeyhhacı
- Tadım
- Temürköy
- Tepeköy
- Tohumlu
- Uzuntarla
- Üçağaç
- Ürünveren
- Yalındamlar
- Yalnız
- Yazıpınarı
- Yedigöze
- Yenikapı
- Yenikonak
- Yolçatı
- Yolüstü
- Yukarıçakmak
- Yukarıdemirtaş
- Yünlüce
- Yürekli

== Ağın ==
- Ağın
- Altınayva
- Aşağıyabanlı
- Bademli
- Bahadırlar
- Balkayası
- Beyelması
- Demirçarık
- Dibekli
- Kaşpınar
- Modanlı
- Öğrendik
- Pulköy
- Samançay
- Saraycık
- Yedibağ
- Yenipayam

== Alacakaya ==
- Alacakaya
- Bakladamlar
- Çakmakkaya
- Çanakça
- Çataklı
- Esenlik
- Gürçubuk
- Halkalı
- İncebayır
- Kayranlı
- Yalnızdamlar

== Arıcak ==
- Arıcak
- Bükardı
- Erimli
- Üçocak
- Bozçavuş
- Çavuşdere
- Çevrecik
- Erbağı
- Göründü
- Kambertepe
- Karakaş
- Küplüce
- Ormanpınar
- Yoğunbilek

== Baskil ==
- Baskil
- Akdemir
- Akuşağı
- Aladikme
- Alangören
- Altınuşağı
- Aşağıkuluşağı
- Beşbölük
- Bilaluşağı
- Bozoğlak
- Çavuşlu
- Çiğdemlik
- Deliktaş
- Demirlibahçe
- Doğancık
- Düğüntepe
- Emirhan
- Eskiköy
- Gemici
- Habibuşağı
- Hacıhüseyinler
- Hacımehmetli
- Hacımustafaköy
- Hacıuşağı
- Harabekayış
- Hüyükköy
- Işıklar
- İçlikaval
- İmikuşağı
- Kadıköy
- Karaali
- Karagedik
- Karakaş
- Karoğlu
- Kayabeyli
- Kızıluşağı
- Koçyolu
- Konacık
- Konalga
- Kumlutarla
- Kuşsarayı
- Kutlugün
- Meydancık
- Paşakonağı
- Pınarlı
- Resulkahya
- Sarıtaş
- Söğütdere
- Suyatağı
- Şahaplı
- Şahindere
- Şeyh Hasan
- Şituşağı
- Tatlıpayam
- Tavşanuşağı
- Topaluşağı
- Yalındam
- Yaylanlı
- Yeniocak
- Yıldızlı
- Yukarıkuluşağı

== Karakoçan ==
- Karakoçan
- Sarıcan
- Ağamezraası
- Akarbaşı
- Akbulak
- Akçiçek
- Akkuş
- Akpınar
- Akyokuş
- Alabal
- Alayağmur
- Altınoluk
- Aşağıovacık
- Bağlıağaç
- Bahçecik
- Balcalı
- Bardaklı
- Başyurt
- Bazlama
- Beydere
- Bulgurcuk
- Cumhuriyet
- Çalıkaya
- Çamardı
- Çan
- Çanakçı
- Çatalyol
- Çavuşyolu
- Çayırdam
- Çayırgülü
- Çelebi
- Çıtak
- Demirdelen
- Demirtaş
- Demirtepe
- Deveci
- Doğanoğlu
- Dumluyazı
- Durmuşköy
- Gözerek
- Güllüce
- Gümüşakar
- Gündeğdi
- Hamurkesen
- Hamzalı
- İsabey
- Kalecik
- Kalkankaya
- Karaçan
- Karakoçan
- Karapınar
- Karasakal
- Kavakdere
- Kavalcık
- Keklikköy
- Kırgıl
- Kızılca
- Kızılpınar
- Kocadayı
- Koçyiğitler
- Korudibi
- Köryusuf
- Kulundere
- Kuşbayırı
- Kuşçu
- Kümbet
- Mahmutlu
- Maksutali
- Mirahmet
- Okçular
- Ormancık
- Özlüce
- Pamuklu
- Paşayaylası
- Pilavtepe
- Sağın
- Sağucak
- Sarıbaşak
- Sarıhan
- Tekardıç
- Üçbudak
- Yalıntaş
- Yenice
- Yenikaya
- Yeniköy
- Yeşilbelen
- Yoğunağaç
- Yukarıovacık
- Yücekonak
- Yüzev

== Keban ==
- Keban
- Akçatepe
- Akgömlek
- Altınkürek
- Altıyaka
- Aşağıçakmak
- Aslankaşı
- Bademli
- Bahçeli
- Bayındır
- Beydeğirmeni
- Bölükçalı
- Büklümlü
- Çalık
- Çevrekaya
- Denizli
- Dürümlü
- Gökbelen
- Göldere
- Güneytepe
- Kopuzlu
- Koyunuşağı
- Kurşunkaya
- Kuşçu
- Nimri
- Örenyaka
- Sağdıçlar
- Taşkesen
- Topkıran
- Üçpınar
- Ulupınar

== Kovancılar ==
- Kovancılar
- Adalı
- Akmezra
- Aşağıdemirci
- Aşağıkanatlı
- Aşağıköse
- Aşağımirahmet
- Avlağı
- Bağgülü
- Bayramyazı
- Beşpınar
- Bilalköy
- Çakırkaş
- Çatakbaşı
- Çaybağı
- Çelebi
- Çiftlik
- Değirmentaşı
- Demirci
- Durmuşlar
- Ekinbağı
- Ekinözü
- Gedikyurt
- Göçmezler
- Gökçedal
- Gözecik
- Gülçatı
- Hacımekke
- Hacısam
- İğdeli
- İsaağamezrası
- Kacar
- Karabörk
- Karaman
- Karasungur
- Karıncaköy
- Kavakköy
- Kayalık
- Kolluca
- Köprüdere
- Kuşağacı
- Kuşçu
- Muratbağı
- Mustafaköy
- Nişankaya
- Okçular
- Osmanağa
- Payamlı
- Salkımlı
- Saraybahçe
- Sarıbuğday
- Soğanlı
- Soğukpınar
- Sürekli
- Şekerci
- Şenova
- Tabanözü
- Taşçanak
- Taşören
- Tatar
- Tepebağ
- Topağaç
- Uyandık
- Uzunova
- Vali Fahribey
- Yarımca
- Yazıbaşı
- Yenidam
- Yeniköy
- Yeşildere
- Yeşilköy
- Yılbaşı
- Yoncalıbayır
- Yukarıdemirli
- Yukarıkanatlı
- Yukarıkazanlar
- Yukarımirahmet

== Maden ==
- Maden
- Ağadibek
- Akboğa
- Altıntarla
- Arslantaşı
- Bahçedere
- Cumhuriyetçi
- Çakıroğlu
- Çalkaya
- Çayırköy
- Çitliköy
- Durmuştepe
- Dutpınar
- Eğrikavak
- Gezin
- Hanevleri
- Hatunköy
- Işıktepe
- Karatop
- Kartaldere
- Kaşlıca
- Kavak
- Kayalar
- Kızıltepe
- Koçkonağı
- Kumyazı
- Küçükova
- Naldöken
- Örtülü
- Plajköy
- Polatköy
- Sağrılı
- Tekevler
- Tepecik
- Topaluşağı
- Yenibahçe
- Yeşilova
- Yıldızhan
- Yoncapınar

== Palu ==
- Beyhan
- Palu
- Akbulut
- Akyürek
- Altınölçek
- Andılar
- Arındık
- Atik
- Baltaşı
- Beydoğan
- Bozçanak
- Bölükelma
- Burgudere
- Büyükçaltı
- Damlapınar
- Gemtepe
- Gökdere
- Güllüce
- Gümeçbağlar
- Gümüşkaynak
- Hasbey
- Karacabağ
- Karasalkım
- Karataş
- Kasıl
- Kayahisar
- Kayaönü
- Keklikdere
- Kırkbulak
- Köklüce
- Küçükçaltı
- Örencik
- Örgülü
- Seydili
- Tarhana
- Umutkaya
- Üçdeğirmenler
- Yarımtepe
- Yeşilbayır

== Sivrice ==
- Sivrice
- Akbuğday
- Akseki
- Alaattinköy
- Alıncık
- Aşağıçanakçı
- Başkaynak
- Bekçitepe
- Canuşağı
- Çatakkaya
- Çevrimtaş
- Çortunlu
- Dedeyolu
- Dereboynu
- Dikmen
- Doğanbağı
- Dörtbölük
- Duygulu
- Elmasuyu
- Gelindere
- Görgülü
- Gözeli
- Günay
- Günbalı
- Hacılar
- Haftasar
- Ilıncak
- Kalaba
- Kamışlık
- Kavakköy
- Kavallı
- Kayabağları
- Kayapınar
- Kılıçkaya
- Kösebayır
- Kürkköy
- Mollaali
- Nergize
- Soğukpınar
- Sürek
- Tarlatepe
- Taşlıyayla
- Topaluşağı
- Uslu
- Üçlerce
- Üğrük
- Yaruşağı
- Yedikardeş
- Yedipınar
- Yukarıçanakçı
- Yürekkaya
