= Kacar =

Kacar may refer to:

- Kačar, Serbian surname
- Kaçar, Turkish surname
- Kacar, Kovancılar
