= Pamuklu =

Pamuklu can refer to:

- Pamuklu, Çermik
- Pamuklu, Karakoçan
- Pamuklu, Mut
- the Turkish name for Tavros, Cyprus
