= Salkımlı =

Salkımlı may refer to the following places in Turkey:

- Salkımlı, Artvin
- Salkımlı, Kovancılar
- Salkımlı, Kulp
