= Gözecik =

Gözecik can refer to:

- Gözecik, Kovancılar
- Gözecik, Mengen
