= Sagin =

Sagin may refer to:

- Sagin, Iran, a village in Kerman Province, Iran
- Sağın, Karakoçan
