= Gümüşakar =

Gümüşakar can refer to:

- Gümüşakar, Karakoçan
- Gümüşakar, Refahiye
