= Avlağı =

Avlağı can refer to:

- Avlağı, Kovancılar
- Avlağı, Osmancık
