= Topağaç =

Topağaç can refer to:

- Topağaç, Kovancılar
- Topağaç, Refahiye
- Topağaç, Marmara
