= Kapıaçmaz, Kovancılar =

Village in Turkey

Kapıaçmaz
- Neighbourhood
- Location in Turkey
- Coordinates: 38°42′N 39°53′E
- Country: Turkey
- Province: Elazığ
- District: Kovancılar
- Municipality: Kovancılar
- Population (2021): 752
- Time zone: UTC+3 (TRT)

Kapıaçmaz is a neighbourhood of the town Kovancılar of Elazığ Province in Turkey. Its population is 752 (2021).
