= Isabey =

Isabey (or Isa Bey) may refer to:

Persons

- Eugène Isabey (1803–1886), French painter, draftsman and printmaker
- Jean-Baptiste Isabey (1767–1855), French painter born at Nancy
- Michaël Isabey (born 1975), French football midfielder

Places in Turkey

- the modern Anatolian site of the Ancient town and former Roman bishopric of Lunda (Asia Minor), now a Latin Catholic titular see
- Isabey Mosque or İsa Bey Mosque, on the outskirts of the Ayasluğ Hills at Selçuk, İzmir, named after it builder, an Aydinid from the Anatolian Seljuk beyliks (1374–1375)
- İsabey, Çal
- İsabey, Karakoçan

== See also ==
- Isabeau
