= Karacan =

Karacan is a Turkish surname. Notable people with the surname include:

- Ali Naci Karacan (1896–1955), Turkish journalist and publisher
- Jem Karacan (born 1989), Turkish footballer

== See also ==
- Karaçan, Karakoçan
