= Alabal =

Alabal can refer to:

- Alabal, Karakoçan
- Alabal, Sur
