= Kalkankaya =

Kalkankaya can refer to:

- Kalkankaya, Karakoçan
- Kalkankaya, Posof
