= Akyokuş =

Akyokuş can refer to:

- Akyokuş, Karakoçan
- Akyokuş, Mudurnu
