= Sarıbuğday =

Sarıbuğday can refer to:

- Sarıbuğday, Kovancılar
- Sarıbuğday, Merzifon
- Sarıbuğday, Silvan
