= Hamurkesen =

Hamurkesen can refer to:

- Hamurkesen, Karakoçan
- Hamurkesen, Van
