= Sarıbaşak =

Sarıbaşak can refer to:

- Sarıbaşak, Karakoçan
- Sarıbaşak, Olur
