= Yenidam =

Yenidam can refer to:

- Yenidam, Kovancılar
- Yenidam, Seyhan
