= Yarımca, Kovancılar =

Yarımca
- Village
- Location within Turkey
- Coordinates: 38°40′N 39°46′E
- Country: Turkey
- Province: Elazığ
- District: Kovancılar
- Elevation: 875 m (2,871 ft)
- Population (2021): 1,080
- Time zone: UTC+3 (TRT)
- Postal code: 23850
- Area code: 0424

Yarımca is a village in Kovancılar district of Elazığ Province, Turkey. It is situated to the north of Keban Dam resorvoir. The distance to Kovancılar is 12 kilometres (7.5 mi). Its population is 1,080 (2021). Before the 2013 reorganisation, it was a town (belde).
