= Kovancılar District =

- District
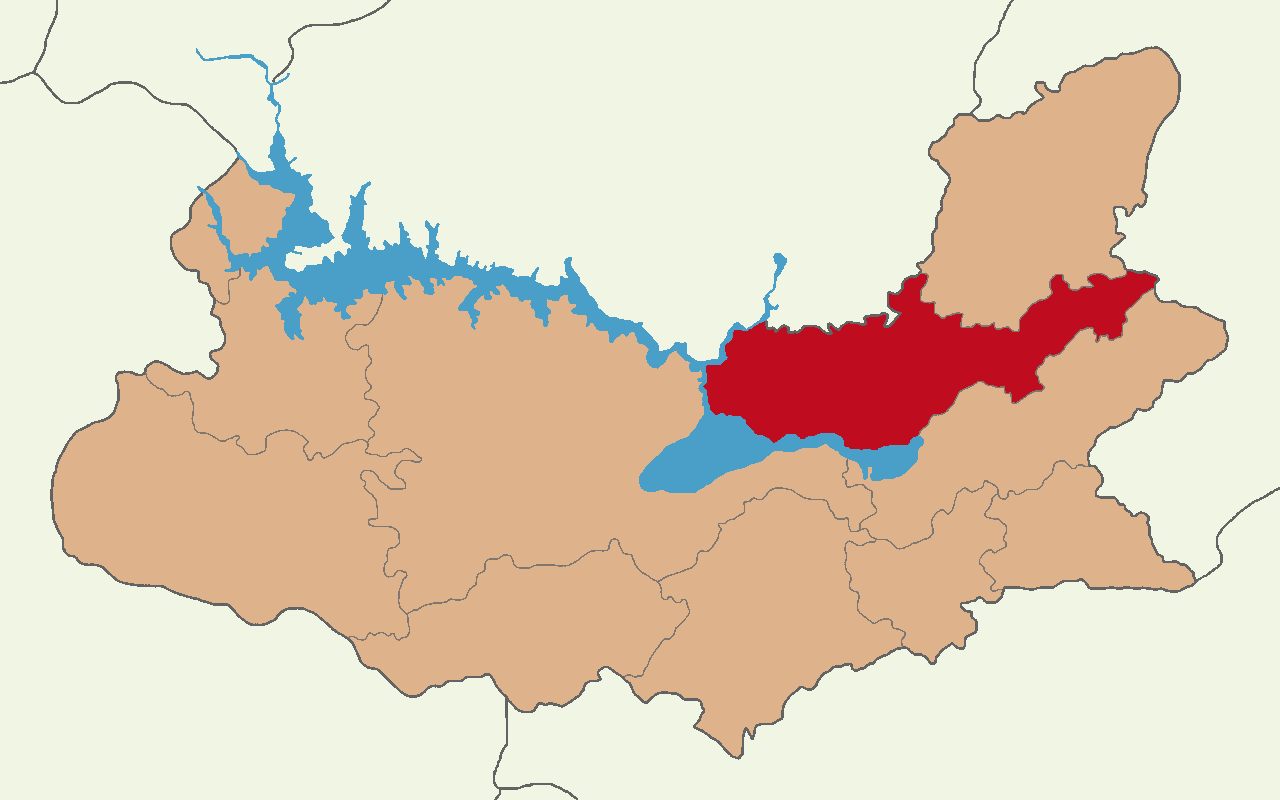
- Map showing Kovancılar District in Elazığ Province

- Location in Turkey
- Coordinates: 38°43′N 39°52′E
- Country: Turkey
- Province: Elazığ
- Seat: Karakoçan

Government
  - Kaymakam: Selçuk Aslan
- Area: 960 km^{2} (370 sq mi)
- Population (2021): 39,464
  - Density: 41/km^{2} (110/sq mi)
- Time zone: UTC+3 (TRT)

Kovancılar District is a district of Elazığ Province of Turkey. Its seat is the town Kovancılar. Its area is 960 km^{2}, and its population is 39,464 (2021). The district was established in 1987.

== Geography ==
The climate of the district is fairly mild to warm. Especially after the construction of Keban and Karakaya dams on the Euphrates River, the climate has mellowed to a great extent. The winter season is quite mild in the villages located on the banks of Keban Dam in the plain next to the district center. Most of the precipitation, which usually falls as rain, falls in the spring season. The average rainfall is around 500 - 600 millimeters. The hottest month of the year is July. The highest temperature is 39-40 degrees. In February, the coldest period of the year, the lowest temperature is between 20 and 25 degrees.

=== Composition ===
There is 1 municipality in Kovancılar District:

- Kovancılar

There are 76 villages in Kovancılar District:

- Adalı
- Akmezra
- Aşağıdemirci
- Aşağıkanatlı
- Aşağıköse
- Aşağımirahmet
- Avlağı
- Bağgülü
- Bayramyazı
- Beşpınar
- Bilalköy
- Çakırkaş
- Çatakbaşı
- Çaybağı
- Çelebi
- Çiftlik
- Değirmentaşı
- Demirci
- Durmuşlar
- Ekinbağı
- Ekinözü
- Gedikyurt
- Göçmezler
- Gökçedal
- Gözecik
- Gülçatı
- Hacımekke
- Hacısam
- İğdeli
- İsaağamezrası
- Kacar
- Karabörk
- Karaman
- Karasungur
- Karıncaköy
- Kavakköy
- Kayalık
- Kolluca
- Köprüdere
- Kuşağacı
- Kuşçu
- Muratbağı
- Mustafaköy
- Nişankaya
- Okçular
- Osmanağa
- Payamlı
- Salkımlı
- Saraybahçe
- Sarıbuğday
- Soğanlı
- Soğukpınar
- Sürekli
- Şekerci
- Şenova
- Tabanözü
- Taşçanak
- Taşören
- Tatar
- Tepebağ
- Topağaç
- Uyandık
- Uzunova
- Vali Fahribey
- Yarımca
- Yazıbaşı
- Yenidam
- Yeniköy
- Yeşildere
- Yeşilköy
- Yılbaşı
- Yoncalıbayır
- Yukarıdemirli
- Yukarıkanatlı
- Yukarıkazanlar
- Yukarımirahmet

== Economic structure ==
85% of the district population is engaged in agriculture and animal husbandry. In 35% of the territory of the district, family agriculture is carried out in various forms of small enterprises. In addition, especially industrial crops (sugar beet, sunflower, cotton, etc.) are gaining importance. Especially tomatoes, peppers, onions and garlic are grown for commercial purposes. Mor Karaman breed sheep are dominant in the region and a small amount of Ivesi Ak Karaman sheep are also raised.
