= Karakoçan, Karakoçan =

Village in Turkey

Karakoçan
- Village
- Location in Turkey
- Coordinates: 39.036°N 40.104°E
- Country: Turkey
- Province: Elazığ
- District: Karakoçan
- Population (2021): 25
- Time zone: UTC+3 (TRT)

Karakoçan (Kurdish: Qereçan) is a village in the Karakoçan District of Elazığ Province in Turkey. Its population is 25 (2021). The village is populated by Kurds. It lies about 11 km northeast of the town Karakoçan.
