= Karakoçan District =

- District
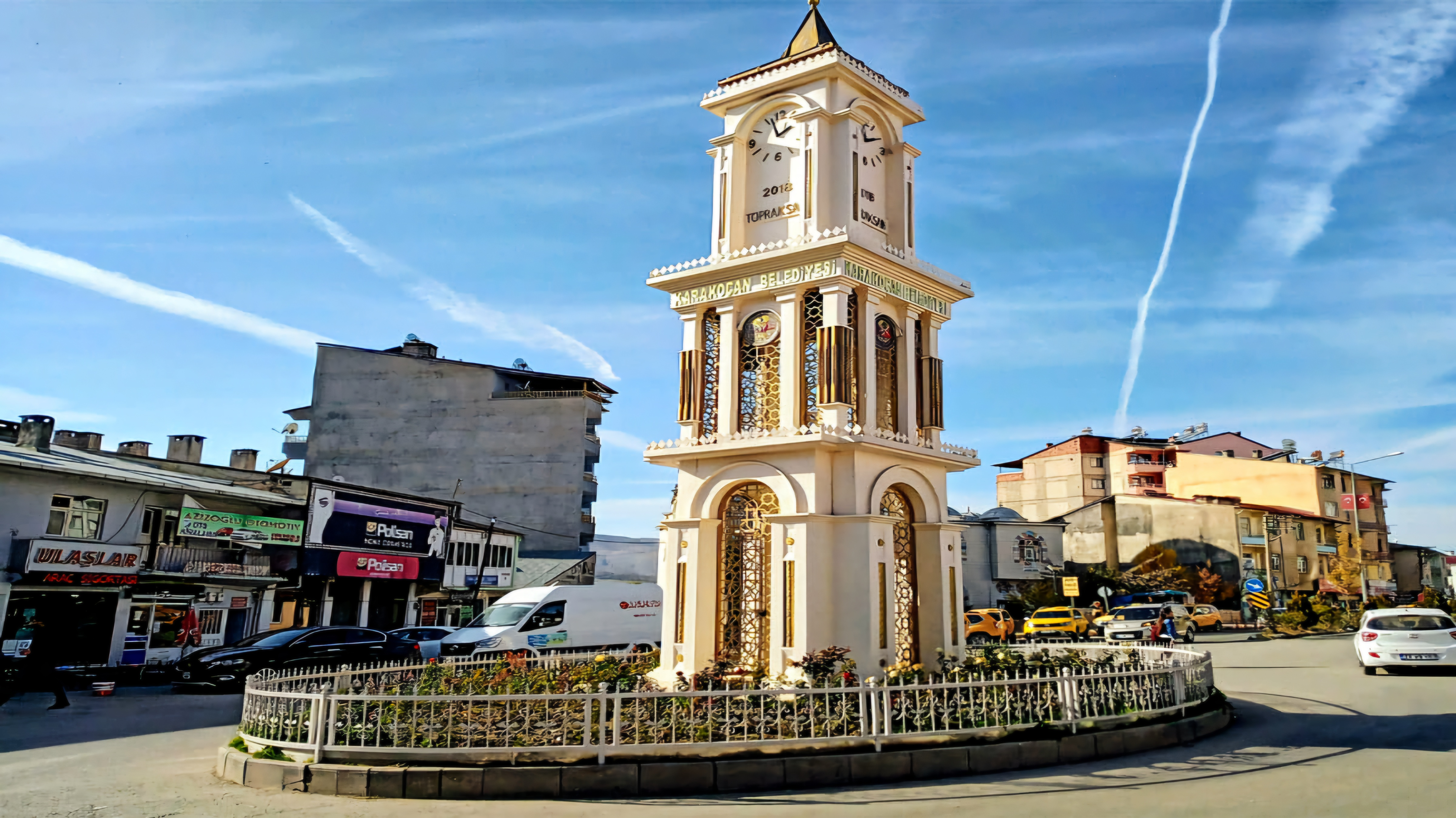
- Karakoçan

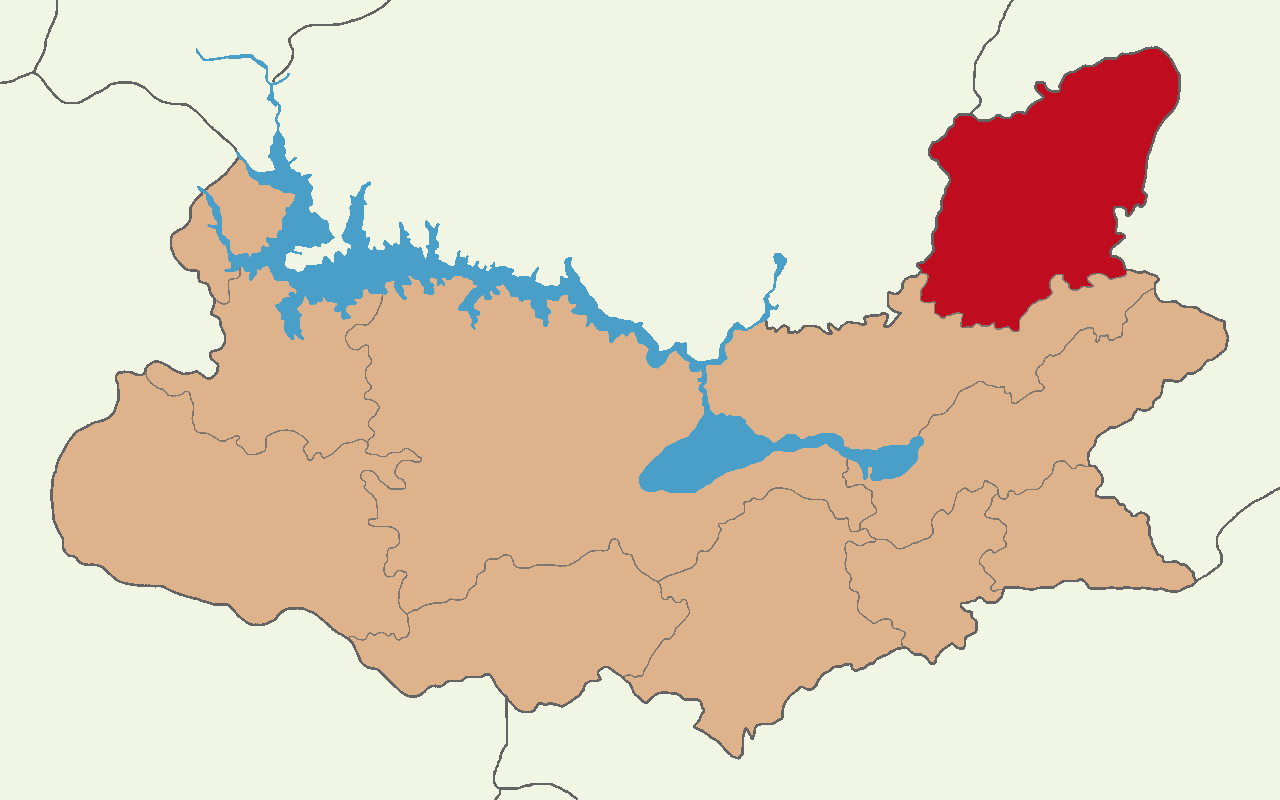
- Map showing Karakoçan District in Elazığ Province

- Location within Turkey
- Coordinates: 38°57′N 40°02′E
- Country: Turkey
- Province: Elazığ
- Seat: Karakoçan

Government
  - Kaymakam: Nebi Çanga
- Area: 1,049 km^{2} (405 sq mi)
- Population (2021): 28,436
  - Density: 27.11/km^{2} (70.21/sq mi)
- Time zone: UTC+3 (TRT)

Karakoçan District is a district of Elazığ Province of Turkey. Its seat is the town Karakoçan. Its area is 1,049 km^{2}, and its population is 28,436 (2021). The district was established in 1936.

== Composition ==
There are 2 municipalities in Karakoçan District:

- Karakoçan
- Sarıcan

There are 88 villages in Karakoçan District:

- Ağamezraası
- Akarbaşı
- Akbulak
- Akçiçek
- Akkuş
- Akpınar
- Akyokuş
- Alabal
- Alayağmur
- Altınoluk
- Aşağıovacık
- Bağlıağaç
- Bahçecik
- Balcalı
- Bardaklı
- Başyurt
- Bazlama
- Beydere
- Bulgurcuk
- Cumhuriyet
- Çalıkaya
- Çamardı
- Çan
- Çanakçı
- Çatalyol
- Çavuşyolu
- Çayırdam
- Çayırgülü
- Çelebi
- Çıtak
- Demirdelen
- Demirtaş
- Demirtepe
- Deveci
- Doğanoğlu
- Dumluyazı
- Durmuşköy
- Gözerek
- Güllüce
- Gümüşakar
- Gündeğdi
- Hamurkesen
- Hamzalı
- İsabey
- Kalecik
- Kalkankaya
- Karaçan
- Karakoçan
- Karapınar
- Karasakal
- Kavakdere
- Kavalcık
- Keklikköy
- Kırgıl
- Kızılca
- Kızılpınar
- Kocadayı
- Koçyiğitler
- Korudibi
- Köryusuf
- Kulundere
- Kuşbayırı
- Kuşçu
- Kümbet
- Mahmutlu
- Maksutali
- Mirahmet
- Okçular
- Ormancık
- Özlüce
- Pamuklu
- Paşayaylası
- Pilavtepe
- Sağın
- Sağucak
- Sarıbaşak
- Sarıhan
- Tekardıç
- Üçbudak
- Yalıntaş
- Yenice
- Yenikaya
- Yeniköy
- Yeşilbelen
- Yoğunağaç
- Yukarıovacık
- Yücekonak
- Yüzev
