= Kačar =

Kačar (Serbian Cyrillic: Качар) is an occupational Serbian surname meaning cooper. It may refer to:

- Ervin Kačar (born 1991), Serbian football player
- Gojko Kačar (born 1987), Serbian football player
- Slobodan Kačar (born 1957), Yugoslav boxer, brother of Tadija
- Svetozar Kačar, Yugoslav war hero, eponym of Kačarevo
- Tadija Kačar (born 1956), Yugoslav boxer, brother of Slobodan, father of Gojko

== See also ==
- Kaçar, a Turkish surname
