= Aşağıkanatlı, Kovancılar =

Village in Turkey

Aşağıkanatlı
- Village
- Location in Turkey
- Coordinates: 38.8481°N 40.0962°E
- Country: Turkey
- Province: Elazığ
- District: Kovancılar
- Population (2023): 12
- Time zone: UTC+3 (TRT)

Aşağıkanatlı is a village in the Kovancılar District of Elazığ Province in Turkey. The village is 97 km away from Elazığ and 26 km away from Kovancılar. The name of the village is mentioned as Lower Nasran in the records of 1928.

== Demographics ==
In 1985, the population of the village was 159. However, it faced a severe decline and as of 2023 only 12 people reside in the village.
