= Deveci, Karakoçan =

Village in Turkey

Deveci
- Village
- Location in Turkey
- Coordinates: 38°49′44″N 39°55′58″E
- Country: Turkey
- Province: Elazığ
- District: Karakoçan
- Population (2021): 165
- Time zone: UTC+3 (TRT)

Deveci (Kurdish: Devecî) is a village in the Karakoçan District of Elazığ Province in Turkey. Its population is 165 (2021). The village is populated by Kurds.
