= Gedikyurt, Kovancılar =

Village in Turkey

Gedikyurt
- Village
- Location in Turkey
- Coordinates: 38°48′N 39°55′E
- Country: Turkey
- Province: Elazığ
- District: Kovancılar
- Population (2021): 532
- Time zone: UTC+3 (TRT)

Gedikyurt is a village in the Kovancılar District of Elazığ Province in Turkey. Its population is 532 (2021). The village is populated by Kurds.
