= Maksutali, Karakoçan =

Village in Turkey

Maksutali
- Village
- Location in Turkey
- Coordinates: 38°52′N 39°54′E
- Country: Turkey
- Province: Elazığ
- District: Karakoçan
- Population (2021): 59
- Time zone: UTC+3 (TRT)

Maksutali (Kurdish: Meqsûdelî) is a village in the Karakoçan District of Elazığ Province in Turkey. Its population is 59 (2021). The village is populated by Kurds of the Izol tribe.
