= Akmezra, Kovancılar =

Village in Turkey

Akmezra
- Village
- Location in Turkey
- Coordinates: 38°42′N 39°48′E
- Country: Turkey
- Province: Elazığ
- District: Kovancılar
- Population (2021): 319
- Time zone: UTC+3 (TRT)

Akmezra is a village in the Kovancılar District of Elazığ Province in Turkey. Its population is 319 (2021). The village is populated by Kurds.
