= Kayalık, Kovancılar =

Village in Turkey

Kayalık
- Village
- Location in Turkey
- Coordinates: 38°52′39″N 40°13′26″E
- Country: Turkey
- Province: Elazığ
- District: Kovancılar
- Population (2021): 81
- Time zone: UTC+3 (TRT)

Kayalık is a village in the Kovancılar District of Elazığ Province in Turkey. Its population is 81 (2021). The village is populated by Kurds.
