= Akarbaşı, Karakoçan =

Village in Turkey

Akarbaşı
- Village
- Location in Turkey
- Coordinates: 39°05′N 39°58′E
- Country: Turkey
- Province: Elazığ
- District: Karakoçan
- Population (2021): 152
- Time zone: UTC+3 (TRT)

Akarbaşı (Kurdish: Çakan) is a village in the Karakoçan District of Elazığ Province in Turkey. Its population is 152 (2021). The village is populated by Kurds of the Şadiyan tribe.
