= Yukarıkazanlar, Kovancılar =

Village in Turkey

Yukarıkazanlar
- Village
- Location in Turkey
- Coordinates: 38°46′12″N 39°40′0″E
- Country: Turkey
- Province: Elazığ
- District: Kovancılar
- Population (2021): 54
- Time zone: UTC+3 (TRT)

Yukarıkazanlar is a village in the Kovancılar District of Elazığ Province in Turkey. Its population is 54 (2021).
