= Karapınar, Karakoçan =

Village in Turkey

Karapınar
- Village
- Location in Turkey
- Coordinates: 38°58′19″N 40°1′34″E
- Country: Turkey
- Province: Elazığ
- District: Karakoçan
- Population (2021): 259
- Time zone: UTC+3 (TRT)

Karapınar (Kurdish: Qerepinar) is a village in the Karakoçan District of Elazığ Province in Turkey. Its population is 259 (2021). The village is populated by Kurds.
