= Bağgülü, Kovancılar =

Village in Turkey

Bağgülü
- Village
- Location in Turkey
- Coordinates: 38.7895°N 39.7696°E
- Country: Turkey
- Province: Elazığ
- District: Kovancılar
- Population (2021): 63
- Time zone: UTC+3 (TRT)

Bağgülü is a village in the Kovancılar District of Elazığ Province in Turkey. Its population is 63 (2021).
