= Cumhuriyet, Karakoçan =

Village in Turkey

Cumhuriyet
- Village
- Location in Turkey
- Coordinates: 38°52′44″N 39°55′51″E
- Country: Turkey
- Province: Elazığ
- District: Karakoçan
- Population (2021): 79
- Time zone: UTC+3 (TRT)

Cumhuriyet is a village in the Karakoçan District of Elazığ Province in Turkey. Its population is 79 (2021). The village is populated by Kurds.
