= Bahçecik, Karakoçan =

Village in Turkey

Bahçecik
- Village
- Location in Turkey
- Coordinates: 38.9005°N 40.0865°E
- Country: Turkey
- Province: Elazığ
- District: Karakoçan
- Population (2021): 418
- Time zone: UTC+3 (TRT)

Bahçecik (Kurdish: Baxçecox) is a village in the Karakoçan District of Elazığ Province in Turkey. Its population is 418 (2021). The village is populated by Kurds.
