= Kümbet, Karakoçan =

Village in Turkey

Kümbet
- Village
- Location in Turkey
- Coordinates: 38°53′12″N 39°54′27″E
- Country: Turkey
- Province: Elazığ
- District: Karakoçan
- Population (2021): 73
- Time zone: UTC+3 (TRT)

Kümbet (Kurdish: Kumbet) is a village in the Karakoçan District of Elazığ Province in Turkey. The village is populated by Kurds and had a population of 73 in 2021.
