= Yüzev, Karakoçan =

Village in Turkey

Yüzev
- Village
- Location in Turkey
- Coordinates: 38°53′35″N 39°56′16″E
- Country: Turkey
- Province: Elazığ
- District: Karakoçan
- Population (2021): 188
- Time zone: UTC+3 (TRT)

Yüzev (Kurdish: Ûzev) is a village in the Karakoçan District of Elazığ Province in Turkey. Its population is 188 (2021). The village is populated by Kurds.
