= Bilalköy, Kovancılar =

Village in Turkey

Bilalköy
- Village
- Location in Turkey
- Coordinates: 38.7537°N 39.8224°E
- Country: Turkey
- Province: Elazığ
- District: Kovancılar
- Population (2021): 23
- Time zone: UTC+3 (TRT)

Bilalköy or Emirhan is a village in the Kovancılar District of Elazığ Province in Turkey. Its population is 23 (2021).
