= Yalıntaş, Karakoçan =

Village in Turkey

Yalıntaş
- Village
- Location in Turkey
- Coordinates: 39°2′48″N 39°58′35″E
- Country: Turkey
- Province: Elazığ
- District: Karakoçan
- Population (2021): 94
- Time zone: UTC+3 (TRT)

Yalıntaş (Kurdish: Şewitiyan) is a village in the Karakoçan District of Elazığ Province in Turkey. Its population is 94 (2021). The village is populated by Kurds.
