= Hacımekke, Kovancılar =

Village in Turkey

Hacımekke
- Village
- Location in Turkey
- Coordinates: 38°41′N 39°42′E
- Country: Turkey
- Province: Elazığ
- District: Kovancılar
- Population (2021): 66
- Time zone: UTC+3 (TRT)

Hacımekke is a village in the Kovancılar District of Elazığ Province in Turkey. Its population is 66 (2021).
