= Kavalcık, Karakoçan =

Village in Turkey

Kavalcık
- Village
- Location in Turkey
- Coordinates: 39°4′35″N 40°10′51″E
- Country: Turkey
- Province: Elazığ
- District: Karakoçan
- Population (2021): 96
- Time zone: UTC+3 (TRT)

Kavalcık is a village in the Karakoçan District of Elazığ Province in Turkey. Its population is 96 (2021). The village is populated by Kurds.
