= Çelebi, Karakoçan =

Village in Elazığ Province, Turkey

Çelebi
- Village
- Location in Turkey
- Coordinates: 39°7′49″N 40°16′9″E
- Country: Turkey
- Province: Elazığ
- District: Karakoçan
- Population (2021): 113
- Time zone: UTC+3 (TRT)

Çelebi is a village in the Karakoçan District of Elazığ Province in Turkey. Its population is 113 (2021). The village is populated by Kurds.
