= Ekinbağı, Kovancılar =

Village in Turkey

Ekinbağı
- Village
- Location in Turkey
- Coordinates: 38°44′N 39°38′E
- Country: Turkey
- Province: Elazığ
- District: Kovancılar
- Population (2021): 130
- Time zone: UTC+3 (TRT)

Ekinbağı is a village in the Kovancılar District of Elazığ Province in Turkey. Its population is 130 (2021).
