= Karabörk, Kovancılar =

Village in Turkey

Karabörk
- Village
- Location in Turkey
- Coordinates: 38°49′7″N 39°48′55″E
- Country: Turkey
- Province: Elazığ
- District: Kovancılar
- Population (2021): 27
- Time zone: UTC+3 (TRT)

Karabörk (also: Karabük) is a village in the Kovancılar District of Elazığ Province in Turkey. Its population is 27 (2021).
