= Demirtepe, Karakoçan =

Village in Turkey

Demirtepe
- Village
- Location in Turkey
- Coordinates: 38°51′52″N 40°2′21″E
- Country: Turkey
- Province: Elazığ
- District: Karakoçan
- Population (2021): 109
- Time zone: UTC+3 (TRT)

Demirtepe (Kurdish: Seyfan) is a village in the Karakoçan District of Elazığ Province in Turkey. Its population is 109 (2021). The village is populated by Kurds.
