= Karasakal, Karakoçan =

Village in Turkey

Karasakal
- Village
- Location in Turkey
- Coordinates: 38°57′14″N 39°53′20″E
- Country: Turkey
- Province: Elazığ
- District: Karakoçan
- Population (2021): 38
- Time zone: UTC+3 (TRT)

Karasakal (Kurdish: Qereseqal) is a village in the Karakoçan District of Elazığ Province in Turkey. Its population is 38 (2021). The village is populated by Kurds of the Izol tribe.
