= Çalıkaya, Karakoçan =

Village in Turkey

Çalıkaya
- Village
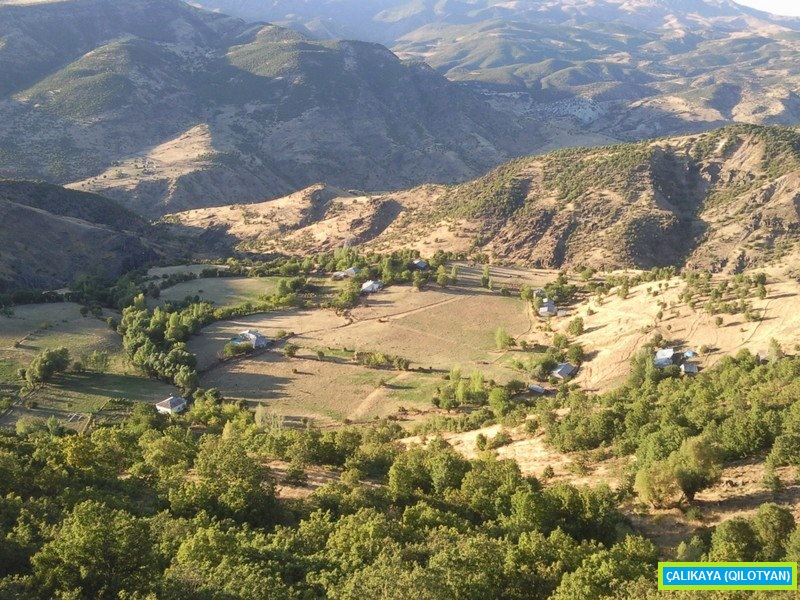

- Location within Turkey
- Coordinates: 39°05′34″N 40°03′11″E
- Country: Turkey
- Province: Elazığ
- District: Karakoçan
- Population (2021): 43
- Time zone: UTC+3 (TRT)

Çalıkaya (Kurdish: Qilotiyan) is a village in the Karakoçan District of Elazığ Province in Turkey. Its population is 43 (2021). The village is populated by Kurds.
