= Kızılpınar, Karakoçan =

Village in Turkey

Kızılpınar
- Village
- Location in Turkey
- Coordinates: 39°0′28″N 40°10′10″E
- Country: Turkey
- Province: Elazığ
- District: Karakoçan
- Population (2021): 193
- Time zone: UTC+3 (TRT)

Kızılpınar (Kurdish: Qizilpinar) is a village in the Karakoçan District of Elazığ Province in Turkey. Its population is 193 (2021). The village is populated by Kurds.
