= Çamardı, Karakoçan =

Village in Turkey

Çamardı
- Village
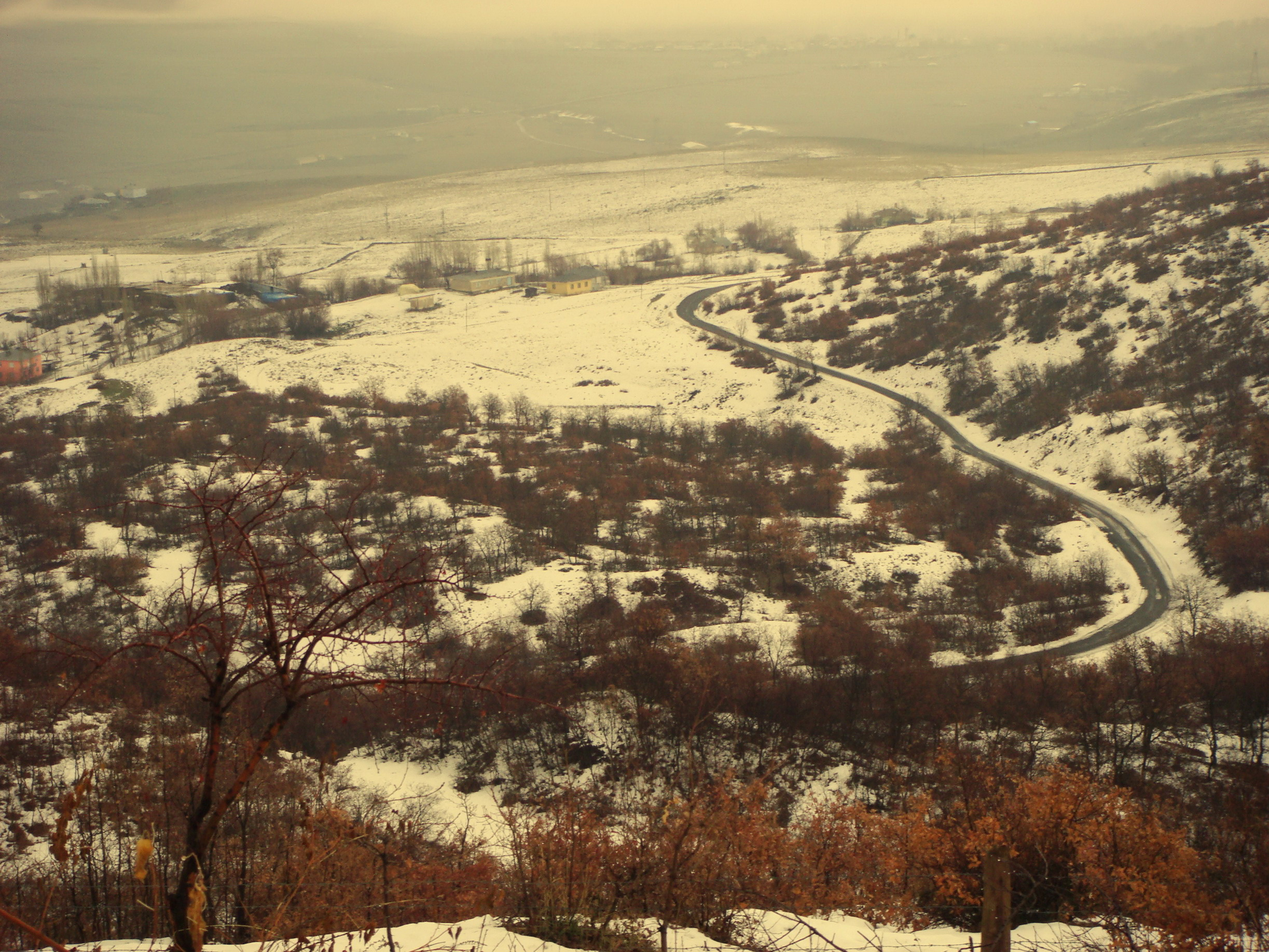

- Location within Turkey
- Coordinates: 38.9772°N 39.9741°E
- Country: Turkey
- Province: Elazığ
- District: Karakoçan
- Population (2021): 47
- Time zone: UTC+3 (TRT)

Çamardı (Kurdish: Elîkana jor) is a village in the Karakoçan District of Elazığ Province in Turkey. Its population is 47 (2021). The village is populated by Kurds of the Şadiyan tribe.
