= Beşpınar, Kovancılar =

Village in Turkey

Beşpınar
- Village
- Location in Turkey
- Coordinates: 38.6811°N 39.8270°E
- Country: Turkey
- Province: Elazığ
- District: Kovancılar
- Population (2021): 97
- Time zone: UTC+3 (TRT)

Beşpınar is a village in the Kovancılar District of Elazığ Province in Turkey. Its population is 97 (2021).
