= Hamzalı, Karakoçan =

Village in Turkey

Hamzalı
- Village
- Location in Turkey
- Coordinates: 38.9983°N 40.0080°E
- Country: Turkey
- Province: Elazığ
- District: Karakoçan
- Population (2021): 141
- Time zone: UTC+3 (TRT)

Hamzalı (Kurdish: Hemzeliyan) is a village in the Karakoçan District of Elazığ Province in Turkey. Its population is 141 (2021). The village is populated by Kurds.
