= Yeşildere, Kovancılar =

Village in Turkey

Yeşildere
- Village
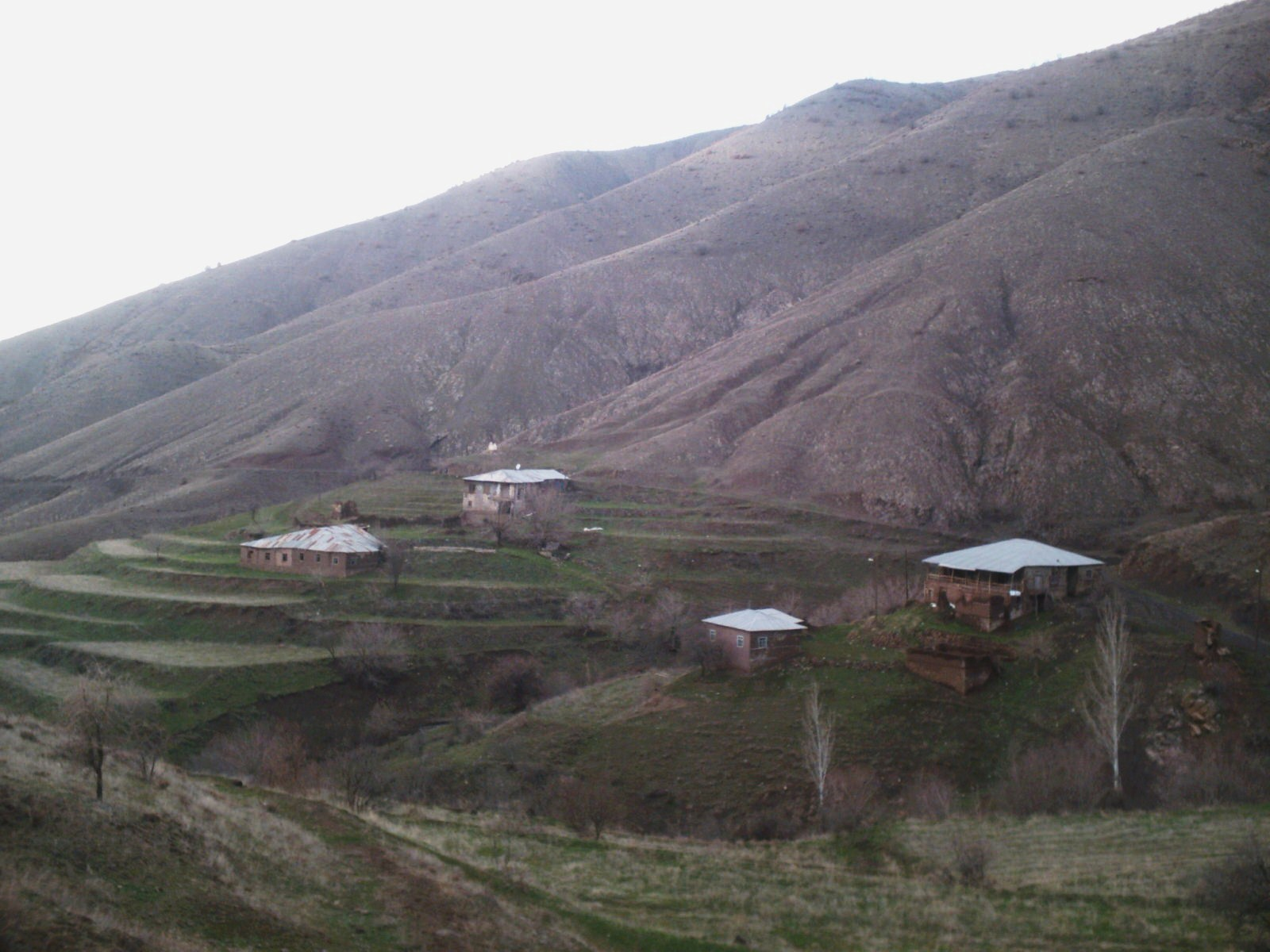

- Location within Turkey
- Coordinates: 38°44′18″N 39°32′8″E
- Country: Turkey
- Province: Elazığ
- District: Kovancılar
- Population (2021): 30
- Time zone: UTC+3 (TRT)

Yeşildere is a village in the Kovancılar District of Elazığ Province in Turkey. The population of the village is 30 People's (2021).
