= Kocadayı, Karakoçan =

Village in Turkey

Kocadayı
- Village
- Location in Turkey
- Coordinates: 39°08′N 40°15′E
- Country: Turkey
- Province: Elazığ
- District: Karakoçan
- Population (2021): 116
- Time zone: UTC+3 (TRT)

Kocadayı is a village in the Karakoçan District of Elazığ Province in Turkey. Its population is 116 (2021). The village is populated by Kurds.
