= Kırgıl, Karakoçan =

Village in Turkey

Kırgıl
- Village
- Location in Turkey
- Coordinates: 38°55′1″N 39°54′36″E
- Country: Turkey
- Province: Elazığ
- District: Karakoçan
- Population (2021): 56
- Time zone: UTC+3 (TRT)

Kırgıl (Kurdish: Qirxil) is a village in the Karakoçan District of Elazığ Province in Turkey. Its population is 56 (2021). The village is populated by Kurds of the Izol tribe.
