= Bayramyazı, Kovancılar =

Village in Turkey

Bayramyazı
- Village
- Location in Turkey
- Coordinates: 38.8048°N 39.9987°E
- Country: Turkey
- Province: Elazığ
- District: Kovancılar
- Population (2021): 247
- Time zone: UTC+3 (TRT)

Bayramyazı (Kurdish: Paho) is a village in the Kovancılar District of Elazığ Province in Turkey. Its population is 247 (2021). The village is populated by Kurds of the Bekiran tribe.
