= Bulgurcuk, Karakoçan =

Village in Turkey

Bulgurcuk
- Village
- Location in Turkey
- Coordinates: 38°56′N 40°10′E
- Country: Turkey
- Province: Elazığ
- District: Karakoçan
- Population (2021): 810
- Time zone: UTC+3 (TRT)

Bulgurcuk (Kurdish: Êx) is a village in the Karakoçan District of Elazığ Province in Turkey. Its population is 810 (2021). The village is populated by Kurds of the Bekiran and Beritan tribes.
