= Gözerek, Karakoçan =

Village in Turkey

Gözerek
- Village
- Location in Turkey
- Coordinates: 38°51′46″N 40°3′41″E
- Country: Turkey
- Province: Elazığ
- District: Karakoçan
- Population (2021): 100
- Time zone: UTC+3 (TRT)

Gözerek (Kurdish: Gozerek) is a village in the Karakoçan District of Elazığ Province in Turkey. Its population is 100 (2021). The village is populated by Kurds.
