= Şenova, Kovancılar =

Village in Turkey

Şenova
- Village
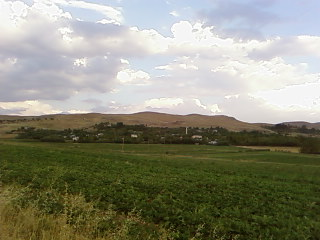

- Location within Turkey
- Coordinates: 38°44′37″N 39°58′21″E
- Country: Turkey
- Province: Elazığ
- District: Kovancılar
- Population (2021): 379
- Time zone: UTC+3 (TRT)

Şenova is a village in the Kovancılar District of Elazığ Province in Turkey. Its population is 379 (2021).
