= Tatar, Kovancılar =

Village in Turkey

Tatar
- Village
- Location in Turkey
- Coordinates: 38.8638°N 39.8253°E
- Country: Turkey
- Province: Elazığ
- District: Kovancılar
- Population (2021): 17
- Time zone: UTC+3 (TRT)

Tatar or Tatarköy (Kurdish: Teteran) is a village in the Kovancılar District of Elazığ Province in Turkey. The village is populated by Kurds of the Izol tribe and had a population of 17 in 2021.
