= Kuşçu, Kovancılar =

Village in Turkey

Kuşçu
- Village
- Location in Turkey
- Coordinates: 38°43′N 39°45′E
- Country: Turkey
- Province: Elazığ
- District: Kovancılar
- Population (2021): 320
- Time zone: UTC+3 (TRT)

Kuşçu (also: Kuşçuköy) is a village in the Kovancılar District of Elazığ Province in Turkey. Its population is 320 (2021).
