= Paşayaylası, Karakoçan =

Village in Turkey

Paşayaylası
- Village
- Location in Turkey
- Coordinates: 38°57′53″N 39°55′33″E
- Country: Turkey
- Province: Elazığ
- District: Karakoçan
- Population (2021): 9
- Time zone: UTC+3 (TRT)

Paşayaylası (Kurdish: Mezreyê Gazê) is a village in the Karakoçan District of Elazığ Province in Turkey. Its population is 9 (2021). The village is populated by Kurds.
