= Aşağıköse, Kovancılar =

Village in Turkey

Aşağıköse
- Village
- Location in Turkey
- Coordinates: 38°44′N 39°41′E
- Country: Turkey
- Province: Elazığ
- District: Kovancılar
- Population (2021): 83
- Time zone: UTC+3 (TRT)

Aşağıköse is a village in the Kovancılar District of Elazığ Province in Turkey. Its population is 83 (2021).
