= Yazıbaşı, Kovancılar =

Village in Turkey

Yazıbaşı
- Village
- Location in Turkey
- Coordinates: 38°43′9″N 39°54′11″E
- Country: Turkey
- Province: Elazığ
- District: Kovancılar
- Population (2021): 737
- Time zone: UTC+3 (TRT)

Yazıbaşı is a village in the Kovancılar District of Elazığ Province in Turkey. Previously, the village was known as Sakrat or Sekrat (Սագրաթ in Armenian, سكرات in Ottoman Turkish). The name of the village was changed between 1955 and 1960 to its current name of Yazıbaşı. Its population is 737 (2021).

The Ottoman population registers from 1840 detailed two Muslim males in one household and 123 non-Muslim males (entirely Armenian) in 23 households. The 1847 non-Muslim population register recorded 110 Armenian males in 24 households. By 1878, an Armenian census for Sakrat listed the names of 275 males and 261 females (536 total Armenians) in 51 households and one Turkish household of 6 people, the household of Nejid Bey. On the eve of the Armenian genocide, the village contained 656 Armenians in 75 households. Sakrat was noted to have one Armenian church named St. Toros.

Censuses during the modern Turkish Republican period recorded the following populations.

| Year | Name | Males | Females | Total Population |
| 1935 | Şekerat | 190 | 185 | 375 |
| 1940 | Şekerat | 117 | 97 | 214 |
| 1945 | Sekrat | 131 | 91 | 222 |
| 1950 | Serkat | | | 210 |
| 1955 | Sekrat | 83 | 62 | 145 |
| 1960 | Yazıbaşı (Sokrat) | 82 | 91 | 173 |
| 1965 | Yazıbaşı (Sekrat) | 136 | 138 | 274 |
| 1980 | Yazıbaşı (Sekrat) | 280 | 294 | 574 |
| 1985 | Yazıbaşı | 310 | 327 | 637 |
| 1990 | Yazıbaşı | | | 684 |
| 1997 | Yazıbaşı | | | 777 |
| 2000 | Yazıbaşı | 427 | 500 | 927 |
