= Ormancık, Karakoçan =

Village in Turkey

Ormancık
- Village
- Location in Turkey
- Coordinates: 38°57′9″N 39°53′52″E
- Country: Turkey
- Province: Elazığ
- District: Karakoçan
- Population (2021): 45
- Time zone: UTC+3 (TRT)

Ormancık (Kurdish: Kolemis) is a village in the Karakoçan District of Elazığ Province in Turkey. Its population is 45 (2021). The village is populated by Kurds of the Izol tribe.
