= Yukarıovacık, Karakoçan =

Village in Turkey

Yukarıovacık
- Village
- Location in Turkey
- Coordinates: 38°52′9″N 40°0′39″E
- Country: Turkey
- Province: Elazığ
- District: Karakoçan
- Population (2021): 252
- Time zone: UTC+3 (TRT)

Yukarıovacık (Kurdish: Kurikanê jorin) is a village in the Karakoçan District of Elazığ Province in Turkey. Its population is 252 (2021). The village is populated by Kurds.
