= Çelebi, Kovancılar =

Village in Kovancılar District, Turkey

Çelebi
- Village
- Location in Turkey
- Coordinates: 38°44′4″N 39°45′55″E
- Country: Turkey
- Province: Elazığ
- District: Kovancılar
- Population (2021): 133
- Time zone: UTC+3 (TRT)

Çelebi is a village in the Kovancılar District of Elazığ Province in Turkey.
