= Saraybahçe, Kovancılar =

Village in Turkey

Saraybahçe
- Village
- Location in Turkey
- Coordinates: 38°44′03″N 39°55′08″E
- Country: Turkey
- Province: Elazığ
- District: Kovancılar
- Population (2021): 462
- Time zone: UTC+3 (TRT)

Saraybahçe is a village in the Kovancılar District of Elazığ Province in Turkey. Its population is 462 (2021).
