= Ekinözü, Kovancılar =

Village in Turkey

Ekinözü
- Village
- Location in Turkey
- Coordinates: 38°46′58″N 39°52′24″E
- Country: Turkey
- Province: Elazığ
- District: Kovancılar
- Population (2021): 876
- Time zone: UTC+3 (TRT)

Ekinözü (Armenian: Հավավ, romanized: Havav, Habab) is a village in the Kovancılar District of Elazığ Province in Turkey. Its population is 876 (2021).

Before the Armenian genocide, it was a large village with 204 dwellings, two churches and one monastery.
