= Çaybağı, Kovancılar =

Village in Turkey

Çaybağı
- Village
- Location in Turkey
- Coordinates: 38°41′35″N 39°37′9″E
- Country: Turkey
- Province: Elazığ
- District: Kovancılar
- Population (2021): 126
- Time zone: UTC+3 (TRT)

Çaybağı is a village in the Kovancılar District of Elazığ Province in Turkey. Its population is 126 (2021).
