= Balcalı, Karakoçan =

Village in Turkey

Balcalı
- Village
- Location in Turkey
- Coordinates: 39.0338°N 39.8827°E
- Country: Turkey
- Province: Elazığ
- District: Karakoçan
- Population (2021): 77
- Time zone: UTC+3 (TRT)

Balcalı (Kurdish: Çeleqes) is a village in the Karakoçan District of Elazığ Province in Turkey. Its population is 77 (2021). The village is populated by Kurds.
