= Karıncaköy, Kovancılar =

Village in Turkey

Karıncaköy
- Village
- Location in Turkey
- Coordinates: 38°45′33″N 39°53′29″E
- Country: Turkey
- Province: Elazığ
- District: Kovancılar
- Population (2021): 454
- Time zone: UTC+3 (TRT)

Karıncaköy is a village in the Kovancılar District of Elazığ Province in Turkey. Its population is 454 (2021).
