= Başyurt, Karakoçan =

Village in Turkey

Başyurt
- Village
- Location in Turkey
- Coordinates: 38.8389°N 39.9872°E
- Country: Turkey
- Province: Elazığ
- District: Karakoçan
- Population (2021): 455
- Time zone: UTC+3 (TRT)

Başyurt (Kurdish: Lexan) is a village in the Karakoçan District of Elazığ Province in Turkey. Its population is 455 (2021). The village is populated by Kurds.
