= Durmuşköy, Karakoçan =

Village in Turkey

Durmuşköy
- Village
- Location in Turkey
- Coordinates: 38°53′51″N 39°59′09″E
- Country: Turkey
- Province: Elazığ
- District: Karakoçan
- Population (2021): 329
- Time zone: UTC+3 (TRT)

Durmuşköy (Kurdish: Hemikan) is a village in the Karakoçan District of Elazığ Province in Turkey. Its population is 329 (2021). The village is populated by Kurds.
