= Yenice, Karakoçan =

Village in Turkey

Yenice
- Village
- Location in Turkey
- Coordinates: 38°55′13″N 40°3′19″E
- Country: Turkey
- Province: Elazığ
- District: Karakoçan
- Population (2021): 439
- Time zone: UTC+3 (TRT)

Yenice (Kurdish: Îngilce) is a village in the Karakoçan District of Elazığ Province in Turkey. Its population is 439 (2021). The village is populated by Kurds.
