= Demirci, Kovancılar =

Village in Turkey

Demirci
- Village
- Location in Turkey
- Coordinates: 38°47′18″N 40°1′26″E
- Country: Turkey
- Province: Elazığ
- District: Kovancılar
- Population (2021): 124
- Time zone: UTC+3 (TRT)

Demirci is a village in the Kovancılar District of Elazığ Province in Turkey. Its population is 124 (2021).
