= Kavakköy, Kovancılar =

Village in Turkey

Kavakköy
- Village
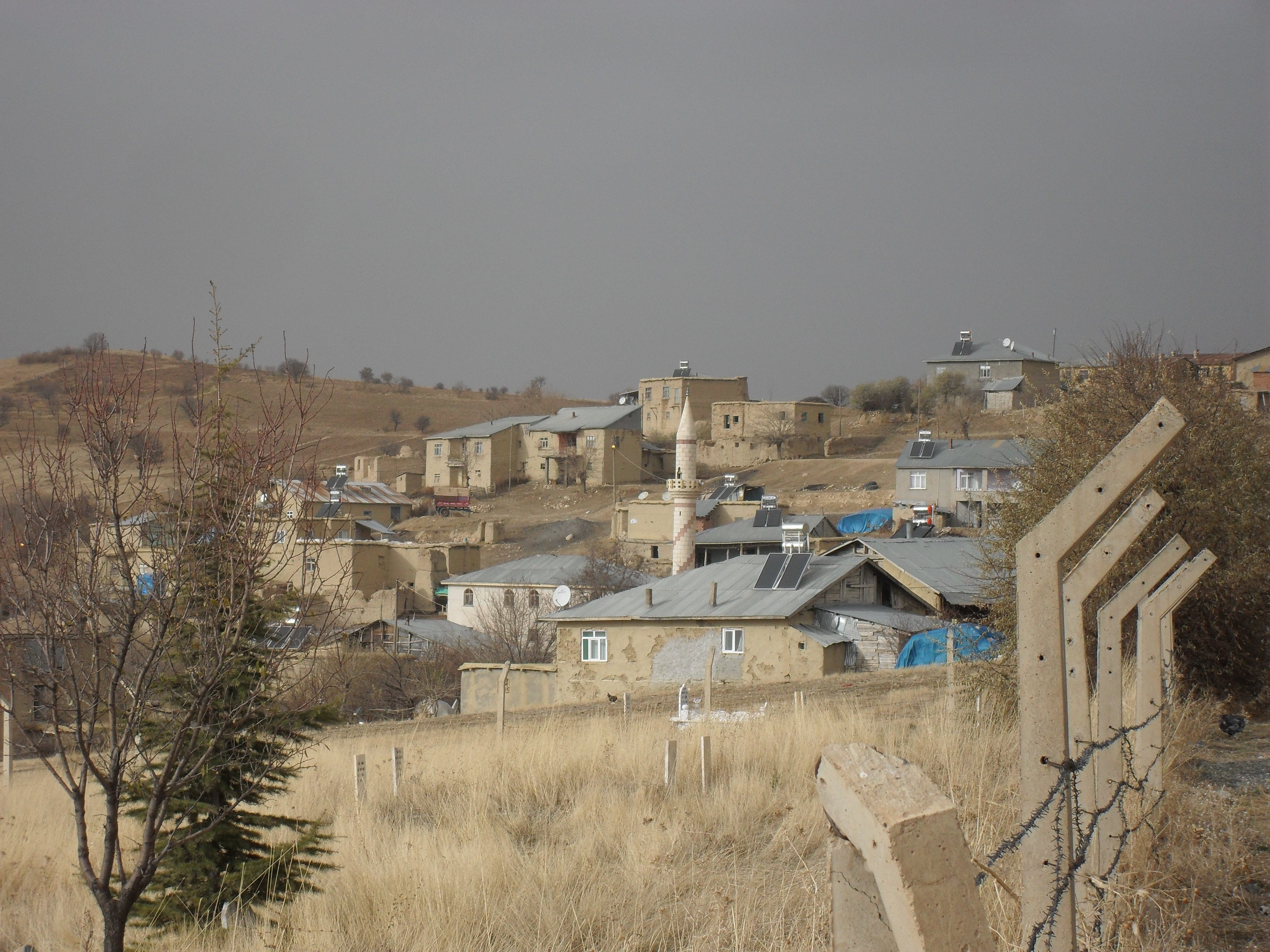

- Location within Turkey
- Coordinates: 38°41′28″N 39°45′27″E
- Country: Turkey
- Province: Elazığ
- District: Kovancılar
- Population (2021): 143
- Time zone: UTC+3 (TRT)

Kavakköy is a village in the Kovancılar District of Elazığ Province in Turkey. Its population is 143 (2021). The village is populated by Kurds of the Beritan tribe.
