= Tepebağ, Kovancılar =

Village in Turkey

Tepebağ
- Village
- Location in Turkey
- Coordinates: 38°42′12″N 39°48′44″E
- Country: Turkey
- Province: Elazığ
- District: Kovancılar
- Population (2021): 434
- Time zone: UTC+3 (TRT)

Tepebağ is a village in the Kovancılar District of Elazığ Province in Turkey. Its population is 434 (2021).
