= Muratbağı, Kovancılar =

Village in Turkey

Muratbağı
- Village
- Location in Turkey
- Coordinates: 38°38′45″N 39°44′4″E
- Country: Turkey
- Province: Elazığ
- District: Kovancılar
- Population (2021): 304
- Time zone: UTC+3 (TRT)

Muratbağı is a village in the Kovancılar District of Elazığ Province in Turkey. Its population is 304 (2021).
