= Çavuşyolu, Karakoçan =

Village in Turkey

Çavuşyolu
- Village
- Location in Turkey
- Coordinates: 39°01′N 40°06′E
- Country: Turkey
- Province: Elazığ
- District: Karakoçan
- Population (2021): 71
- Time zone: UTC+3 (TRT)

Çavuşyolu (Kurdish: Himan) is a village in the Karakoçan District of Elazığ Province in Turkey. Its population is 64 (2021). The village is populated by Kurds.
