= Çanakçı, Karakoçan =

Village in Turkey

Çanakçı
- Village
- Location in Turkey
- Coordinates: 38.9186°N 39.9618°E
- Country: Turkey
- Province: Elazığ
- District: Karakoçan
- Population (2021): 86
- Time zone: UTC+3 (TRT)

Çanakçı (Kurdish: Çenaxçî) is a village in the Karakoçan District of Elazığ Province in Turkey. Its population is 86 (2021). The village is populated by Kurds.
