= Mustafaköy, Kovancılar =

Village in Turkey

Mustafaköy
- Village
- Location in Turkey
- Coordinates: 38°43′N 39°39′E
- Country: Turkey
- Province: Elazığ
- District: Kovancılar
- Population (2021): 77
- Time zone: UTC+3 (TRT)

Mustafaköy is a village in the Kovancılar District of Elazığ Province in Turkey. Its population is 77 (2021).
