= Dumluyazı, Karakoçan =

Village in Turkey

Dumluyazı
- Village
- Location in Turkey
- Coordinates: 39°09′16″N 40°09′11″E
- Country: Turkey
- Province: Elazığ
- District: Karakoçan
- Population (2021): 20
- Time zone: UTC+3 (TRT)

Dumluyazı is a village in the Karakoçan District of Elazığ Province in Turkey. Its population is 20 (2021). The village is populated by Kurds of the Şadiyan tribe.
