= Yılbaşı, Kovancılar =

Village in Turkey

Yılbaşı
- Village
- Location in Turkey
- Coordinates: 38°52′N 40°10′E
- Country: Turkey
- Province: Elazığ
- District: Kovancılar
- Population (2021): 21
- Time zone: UTC+3 (TRT)

Yılbaşı is a village in the Kovancılar District of Elazığ Province in Turkey. Its population is 21 (2021).
