= Durmuşlar, Kovancılar =

Village in Turkey

Durmuşlar
- Village
- Location in Turkey
- Coordinates: 38°49′44″N 40°3′3″E
- Country: Turkey
- Province: Elazığ
- District: Kovancılar
- Population (2021): 35
- Time zone: UTC+3 (TRT)

Durmuşlar is a village in the Kovancılar District of Elazığ Province in Turkey. Its population is 35 (2021).
