= Çıtak, Karakoçan =

Village in Turkey

Çıtak
- Village
- Location in Turkey
- Coordinates: 39°6′28″N 40°9′17″E
- Country: Turkey
- Province: Elazığ
- District: Karakoçan
- Population (2021): 51
- Time zone: UTC+3 (TRT)

Çıtak is a village in the Karakoçan District of Elazığ Province in Turkey. Its population is 51 (2021). The village is populated by Kurds.
