= Bazlama, Karakoçan =

Village in Turkey

Bazlama
- Village
- Location in Turkey
- Coordinates: 39.0855°N 40.1865°E
- Country: Turkey
- Province: Elazığ
- District: Karakoçan
- Population (2021): 287
- Time zone: UTC+3 (TRT)

Bazlama is a village in the Karakoçan District of Elazığ Province in Turkey. Its population is 287 (2021). The village is populated by Kurds.
