= Çatalyol, Karakoçan =

Village in Turkey

Çatalyol
- Village
- Location in Turkey
- Coordinates: 39°1′45″N 40°4′35″E
- Country: Turkey
- Province: Elazığ
- District: Karakoçan
- Population (2021): 15
- Time zone: UTC+3 (TRT)

Çatalyol (Kurdish: Musan) is a village in the Karakoçan District of Elazığ Province in Turkey. Its population is 15 (2021). The village is populated by Kurds.
