= Kavakdere, Karakoçan =

Village in Turkey

Kavakdere
- Village
- Location in Turkey
- Coordinates: 39°0′46″N 40°5′16″E
- Country: Turkey
- Province: Elazığ
- District: Karakoçan
- Population (2021): 47
- Time zone: UTC+3 (TRT)

Kavakdere (Kurdish: Axşîş) is a village in the Karakoçan District of Elazığ Province in Turkey. Its population is 47 (2021). The village is populated by Kurds.
