= Kuşbayırı, Karakoçan =

Village in Turkey

Kuşbayırı
- Village
- Location in Turkey
- Coordinates: 39°10′N 40°14′E
- Country: Turkey
- Province: Elazığ
- District: Karakoçan
- Population (2021): 71
- Time zone: UTC+3 (TRT)

Kuşbayırı is a village in the Karakoçan District of Elazığ Province in Turkey. Its population is 71 (2021). The village is populated by Kurds of the Şadiyan tribe.
