= Aşağımirahmet, Kovancılar =

Village in Turkey

Aşağımirahmet
- Village
- Location in Turkey
- Coordinates: 38.7841°N 40.0563°E
- Country: Turkey
- Province: Elazığ
- District: Kovancılar
- Population (2021): 235
- Time zone: UTC+3 (TRT)

Aşağımirahmet is a village in the Kovancılar District of Elazığ Province in Turkey. Its population is 235 (2021).
