= Yoncalıbayır, Kovancılar =

Village in Turkey

Yoncalıbayır
- Village
- Location in Turkey
- Coordinates: 38°49′04″N 40°10′37″E
- Country: Turkey
- Province: Elazığ
- District: Kovancılar
- Population (2021): 137
- Time zone: UTC+3 (TRT)

Yoncalıbayır is a village in the Kovancılar District of Elazığ Province in Turkey. Its population is 137 (2021).
