= Altınoluk, Karakoçan =

Village in Turkey

Altınoluk
- Village
- Location in Turkey
- Coordinates: 38.8934°N 40.1119°E
- Country: Turkey
- Province: Elazığ
- District: Karakoçan
- Population (2021): 384
- Time zone: UTC+3 (TRT)

Altınoluk (Kurdish: Tirkan) is a village in the Karakoçan District of Elazığ Province in Turkey. Its population is 384 (2021). The village is populated by Kurds.
