= Kuşçu, Karakoçan =

Village in Turkey

Kuşçu
- Village
- Location in Turkey
- Coordinates: 38°49′52″N 39°58′16″E
- Country: Turkey
- Province: Elazığ
- District: Karakoçan
- Population (2021): 168
- Time zone: UTC+3 (TRT)

Kuşçu (Kurdish: Quşçî) is a village in the Karakoçan District of Elazığ Province in Turkey. Its population is 168 (2021). The village is populated by Kurds.
