= Tekardıç, Karakoçan =

Village in Turkey

Tekardıç
- Village
- Location in Turkey
- Coordinates: 38°58′N 40°01′E
- Country: Turkey
- Province: Elazığ
- District: Karakoçan
- Population (2021): 92
- Time zone: UTC+3 (TRT)

Tekardıç (Kurdish: Dilimlî) is a village in the Karakoçan District of Elazığ Province in Turkey. Its population is 92 (2021). The village is populated by Kurds.
