= Osmanağa, Kovancılar =

Village in Turkey

Osmanağa
- Village
- Location in Turkey
- Coordinates: 38°43′N 39°33′E
- Country: Turkey
- Province: Elazığ
- District: Kovancılar
- Population (2021): 79
- Time zone: UTC+3 (TRT)

Osmanağa (also: Osmanağaköy) is a village in the Kovancılar District of Elazığ Province in Turkey. Its population was 79 in 2021.
