= Vali Fahribey, Kovancılar =

Village in Turkey

Vali Fahribey
- Village
- Location in Turkey
- Coordinates: 38°43′34″N 39°34′35″E
- Country: Turkey
- Province: Elazığ
- District: Kovancılar
- Population (2021): 230
- Time zone: UTC+3 (TRT)

Vali Fahribey is a village in the Kovancılar District of Elazığ Province in Turkey. Its population is 230 (2021).
