= Soğukpınar, Kovancılar =

Village in Turkey

Soğukpınar
- Village
- Location in Turkey
- Coordinates: 38.8349°N 39.8574°E
- Country: Turkey
- Province: Elazığ
- District: Kovancılar
- Population (2021): 138
- Time zone: UTC+3 (TRT)

Soğukpınar (Armenian: Art’ekhan) (Note: Also known as Arthan, Artihan, Artıhan, and Artekhan.) is a village in the Kovancılar District of Elazığ Province in Turkey. Its population is 138 (2021).

== History ==
Art’ekhan (today called Soğukpınar) was historically inhabited by Armenians. There were 31 Armenian hearths in 1880. There was an Armenian church of Surb Minas. It was located in the kaza (district) of Palu in the sanjak of Maden in the Diyarbekir vilayet in c. 1900. In 1914, it was populated by 274 Armenians in 33 homes. The village was attacked by çetes in the first half of June 1915 amidst the Armenian genocide.

== Bibliography ==
- Jongerden, Joost; Verheij, Jelle, eds. (2012). Social Relations in Ottoman Diyarbekir, 1870-1915. Brill.
- Kévorkian, Raymond H. (2006). "Demographic Changes in the Armenian Population of Diarbekir, 1895-1914". In Richard G. Hovannisian (ed.). Armenian Tigranakert/Diarbekir and Edessa/Urfa. Mazda Publishers.
- Kévorkian, Raymond (2011). The Armenian Genocide: A Complete History. I.B. Tauris.
