= Akkuş, Karakoçan =

Village in Turkey

Akkuş
- Village
- Location in Turkey
- Coordinates: 39.0934°N 39.9161°E
- Country: Turkey
- Province: Elazığ
- District: Karakoçan
- Population (2021): 27
- Time zone: UTC+3 (TRT)

Akkuş (Kurdish: Paş) is a village in the Karakoçan District of Elazığ Province in Turkey. Its population is 27 (2021). The village is populated by Kurds.
