= İsaağamezrası, Kovancılar =

Village in Turkey

İsaağamezrası
- Village
- Location in Turkey
- Coordinates: 38°49′54″N 40°8′22″E
- Country: Turkey
- Province: Elazığ
- District: Kovancılar
- Population (2021): 25
- Time zone: UTC+3 (TRT)

İsaağamezrası is a village in the Kovancılar District of Elazığ Province in Turkey. Its population is 25 (2021).
