= Karaman, Kovancılar =

Village in Turkey

Karaman
- Village
- Location in Turkey
- Coordinates: 38°45′10″N 40°0′41″E
- Country: Turkey
- Province: Elazığ
- District: Kovancılar
- Population (2021): 157
- Time zone: UTC+3 (TRT)

Karaman is a village in the Kovancılar District of Elazığ Province in Turkey. Its population is 157 (2021).
