= Gündeğdi, Karakoçan =

Village in Turkey

Gündeğdi
- Village
- Location in Turkey
- Coordinates: 39°02′N 40°03′E
- Country: Turkey
- Province: Elazığ
- District: Karakoçan
- Population (2021): 234
- Time zone: UTC+3 (TRT)

Gündeğdi (Kurdish: Çowir), also locally referred to as Cobur, is a village in the Karakoçan District of Elazığ Province in Turkey. Its population is 234 (2021). The village is populated by Kurmanji- speaking Kurds.

== Name ==
The village is locally known as Cobur. The same name is also recorded elsewhere in southeastern Turkey; a study of Gaziantep place names lists Cobur as the former name of Gürbaşak in Nizip, Gaziantep Province.
