= Koçyiğitler, Karakoçan =

Village in Turkey

Koçyiğitler
- Village
- Location in Turkey
- Coordinates: 39°04′N 39°57′E
- Country: Turkey
- Province: Elazığ
- District: Karakoçan
- Population (2021): 128
- Time zone: UTC+3 (TRT)

Koçyiğitler (Kurdish: Xelan) is a village in the Karakoçan District of Elazığ Province in Turkey. Its population is 128 (2021). The village is populated by Kurds.
