= Karasungur, Kovancılar =

Village in Turkey

Karasungur
- Village
- Location in Turkey
- Coordinates: 38°48′2″N 40°3′46″E
- Country: Turkey
- Province: Elazığ
- District: Kovancılar
- Population (2021): 298
- Time zone: UTC+3 (TRT)

Karasungur is a village in the Kovancılar District of Elazığ Province in Turkey. Its population is 298 (2021).
