= Yücekonak, Karakoçan =

Village in Turkey

Yücekonak
- Village
- Location in Turkey
- Coordinates: 39°02′N 40°08′E
- Country: Turkey
- Province: Elazığ
- District: Karakoçan
- Population (2021): 87
- Time zone: UTC+3 (TRT)

Yücekonak (Kurdish: Qawuman) is a village in the Karakoçan District of Elazığ Province in Turkey. Its population is 87 (2021). The village is populated by Kurds.
