= Üçbudak, Karakoçan =

Village in Turkey

Üçbudak
- Village
- Location in Turkey
- Coordinates: 39°00′N 39°56′E
- Country: Turkey
- Province: Elazığ
- District: Karakoçan
- Population (2021): 54
- Time zone: UTC+3 (TRT)

Üçbudak (Kurdish: Delikan) is a village in the Karakoçan District of Elazığ Province in Turkey, populated by Kurds of the Izol tribe. Its population is 54 (2021).
