= Kulundere, Karakoçan =

Village in Turkey

Kulundere
- Village
- Location in Turkey
- Coordinates: 38°58′N 40°07′E
- Country: Turkey
- Province: Elazığ
- District: Karakoçan
- Population (2021): 337
- Time zone: UTC+3 (TRT)

Kulundere (Kurdish: Qulundere) is a village in the Karakoçan District of Elazığ Province in Turkey. Its population is 337 (2021). The village is populated by Kurds of the Bekiran and Şadiyan tribes.
