= Taşören, Kovancılar =

Village in Turkey

Taşören
- Village
- Location in Turkey
- Coordinates: 38.7120°N 39.7696°E
- Country: Turkey
- Province: Elazığ
- District: Kovancılar
- Population (2021): 182
- Time zone: UTC+3 (TRT)

Taşören is a village in the Kovancılar District of Elazığ Province in Turkey. Its population is 182 (2021). The village is populated by Kurds of the Beritan tribe.
