= Okçular, Karakoçan =

Village in Turkey

Okçular
- Village
- Location in Turkey
- Coordinates: 39°4′29″N 40°1′14″E
- Country: Turkey
- Province: Elazığ
- District: Karakoçan
- Population (2021): 225
- Time zone: UTC+3 (TRT)

Okçular (Kurdish: Oxçiyan) is a village in the Karakoçan District of Elazığ Province in Turkey. Its population is 225 (2021). The village is populated by Kurds of the Şadiyan tribe.
