= Pilavtepe, Karakoçan =

Village in Turkey

Pilavtepe
- Village
- Location in Turkey
- Coordinates: 39°08′N 40°11′E
- Country: Turkey
- Province: Elazığ
- District: Karakoçan
- Population (2021): 16
- Time zone: UTC+3 (TRT)

Pilavtepe is a village in the Karakoçan District of Elazığ Province in Turkey. Its population is 16 (2021). The village is populated by Kurds.
