= Alayağmur, Karakoçan =

Village in Elazığ Province, Turkey

Alayağmur
- Village
- Location in Turkey
- Coordinates: 38°53′N 39°52′E
- Country: Turkey
- Province: Elazığ
- District: Karakoçan
- Population (2021): 79
- Time zone: UTC+3 (TRT)

Alayağmur (Kurdish: Elaxmur) is a village in the Karakoçan District of Elazığ Province in Turkey. The village is populated by Kurds of the Izol tribe and had a population of 79 in 2021.
