= Sürekli, Kovancılar =

Village in Turkey

Sürekli
- Village
- Location in Turkey
- Coordinates: 38°44′46″N 39°48′3″E
- Country: Turkey
- Province: Elazığ
- District: Kovancılar
- Population (2021): 59
- Time zone: UTC+3 (TRT)

Sürekli is a village in the Kovancılar District of Elazığ Province in Turkey. Its population is 59 (2021).
