= Ağamezraası, Karakoçan =

Village in Turkey

Ağamezraası
- Village
- Location in Turkey
- Coordinates: 38°57′03″N 40°00′20″E
- Country: Turkey
- Province: Elazığ
- District: Karakoçan
- Population (2021): 298
- Time zone: UTC+3 (TRT)

Ağamezraası (Kurdish: Mezre) is a village in the Karakoçan District of Elazığ Province in Turkey. Its population is 298 (2021). The village is populated by Kurds.
