= Akçiçek, Karakoçan =

Village in Turkey

Akçiçek
- Village
- Location in Turkey
- Coordinates: 38.9767°N 39.9845°E
- Country: Turkey
- Province: Elazığ
- District: Karakoçan
- Population (2021): 42
- Time zone: UTC+3 (TRT)

Akçiçek (Kurdish: Alikan) is a village in the Karakoçan District of Elazığ Province in Turkey. Its population is 42 (2021). The village is populated by Kurds of the Şadiyan tribe.
