= Sarıhan, Karakoçan =

Village in Turkey

Sarıhan
- Village
- Location in Turkey
- Coordinates: 39°9′9″N 40°15′19″E
- Country: Turkey
- Province: Elazığ
- District: Karakoçan
- Population (2021): 70
- Time zone: UTC+3 (TRT)

Sarıhan is a village in the Karakoçan District of Elazığ Province in Turkey. Its population is 70 (2021). The village is populated by Kurds of the Şadiyan tribe.
