= Köprüdere, Kovancılar =

Village in Turkey

Köprüdere
- Village
- Location in Turkey
- Coordinates: 38°45′N 39°56′E
- Country: Turkey
- Province: Elazığ
- District: Kovancılar
- Population (2021): 251
- Time zone: UTC+3 (TRT)

Köprüdere (Armenian: Abrank) (Note: Also known as Abrenk.) is a village in the Kovancılar District of Elazığ Province in Turkey. Its population is 251 (2021).

== History ==
Abrank (today called Köprüdere) was historically inhabited by Armenians. There were 20 Armenian hearths in 1880. There was an Armenian church of Surb Astvatsatsin. It was located in the kaza (district) of Palu in the sanjak of Maden in the Diyarbekir vilayet in c. 1900. In 1914, it was populated by 133 Armenians in 23 homes. The village was attacked by çetes in the first half of June 1915 amidst the Armenian genocide.

== Bibliography ==
- Jongerden, Joost; Verheij, Jelle, eds. (2012). Social Relations in Ottoman Diyarbekir, 1870-1915. Brill.
- Kévorkian, Raymond H. (2006). "Demographic Changes in the Armenian Population of Diarbekir, 1895-1914". In Richard G. Hovannisian (ed.). Armenian Tigranakert/Diarbekir and Edessa/Urfa. Mazda Publishers.
- Kévorkian, Raymond (2011). The Armenian Genocide: A Complete History. I.B. Tauris.
