= Kuşağacı, Kovancılar =

Village in Turkey

Kuşağacı
- Village
- Location in Turkey
- Coordinates: 38°46′N 39°47′E
- Country: Turkey
- Province: Elazığ
- District: Kovancılar
- Population (2021): 78
- Time zone: UTC+3 (TRT)

Kuşağacı is a village in the Kovancılar District of Elazığ Province in Turkey. Its population is 78 (2021).
