= Yukarımirahmet, Kovancılar =

Village in Turkey

Yukarımirahmet
- Village
- Location in Turkey
- Coordinates: 38°47′N 40°05′E
- Country: Turkey
- Province: Elazığ
- District: Kovancılar
- Population (2021): 31
- Time zone: UTC+3 (TRT)

Yukarımirahmet is a village in the Kovancılar District of Elazığ Province in Turkey. Its population is 31 (2021).
