= Akpınar, Karakoçan =

Village in Turkey

Akpınar
- Village
- Location in Turkey
- Coordinates: 39.0742°N 40.1092°E
- Country: Turkey
- Province: Elazığ
- District: Karakoçan
- Population (2021): 61
- Time zone: UTC+3 (TRT)

Akpınar is a village in the Karakoçan District of Elazığ Province in Turkey. Its population is 61 (2021). The village is populated by Kurds.
