= Mahmutlu, Karakoçan =

Village in Turkey

Mahmutlu
- Village
- Location in Turkey
- Coordinates: 38°52′30″N 39°58′2″E
- Country: Turkey
- Province: Elazığ
- District: Karakoçan
- Population (2021): 270
- Time zone: UTC+3 (TRT)

Mahmutlu (Kurdish: Mehmutlî) is a village in the Karakoçan District of Elazığ Province in Turkey. Its population is 270 (2021). The village is populated by Kurds.
