= Hacısam, Kovancılar =

Village in Turkey

Hacısam
- Village
- Location in Turkey
- Coordinates: 38°40′45″N 39°43′01″E
- Country: Turkey
- Province: Elazığ
- District: Kovancılar
- Population (2021): 121
- Time zone: UTC+3 (TRT)

Hacısam is a village in the Kovancılar District of Elazığ Province in Turkey. Its population is 121 (2021).
