= Tabanözü, Kovancılar =

Village in Turkey

Tabanözü
- Village
- Location in Turkey
- Coordinates: 38°50′45″N 40°4′33″E
- Country: Turkey
- Province: Elazığ
- District: Kovancılar
- Population (2021): 119
- Time zone: UTC+3 (TRT)

Tabanözü is a village in the Kovancılar District of Elazığ Province in Turkey. Its population is 119 (2021).
