= Gökçedal, Kovancılar =

Village in Turkey

Gökçedal
- Village
- Location in Turkey
- Coordinates: 38°46′56″N 39°49′24″E
- Country: Turkey
- Province: Elazığ
- District: Kovancılar
- Population (2021): 115
- Time zone: UTC+3 (TRT)

Gökçedal is a village in the Kovancılar District of Elazığ Province in Turkey. Its population is 115 (2021).
