= Demirtaş, Karakoçan =

Village in Turkey

Demirtaş
- Village
- Location in Turkey
- Coordinates: 39°9′0″N 40°11′9″E
- Country: Turkey
- Province: Elazığ
- District: Karakoçan
- Population (2021): 25
- Time zone: UTC+3 (TRT)

Demirtaş is a village in the Karakoçan District of Elazığ Province in Turkey. Its population is 25 (2021). The village is populated by Kurds.
