= Yeniköy, Kovancılar =

Village in Turkey

Yeniköy
- Village
- Location in Turkey
- Coordinates: 38°39′39″N 39°48′17″E
- Country: Turkey
- Province: Elazığ
- District: Kovancılar
- Population (2021): 266
- Time zone: UTC+3 (TRT)

Yeniköy is a village in the Kovancılar District of Elazığ Province in Turkey. Its population is 266 (2021).
