= Nişankaya, Kovancılar =

Village in Turkey

Nişankaya
- Village
- Location in Turkey
- Coordinates: 38°51′9″N 39°48′41″E}}
- Country: Turkey
- Province: Elazığ
- District: Kovancılar
- Population (2021): 81
- Time zone: UTC+3 (TRT)

Nişankaya is a village in the Kovancılar District of Elazığ Province in Turkey. Its population is 81 (2021).
