= Uyandık, Kovancılar =

Village in Turkey

Uyandık
- Village
- Location in Turkey
- Coordinates: 38.7984°N 39.5629°E
- Country: Turkey
- Province: Elazığ
- District: Kovancılar
- Population (2021): 48
- Time zone: UTC+3 (TRT)

Uyandık is a village in the Kovancılar District of Elazığ Province in Turkey. Its population is 48 (2021).
