= Mirahmet, Karakoçan =

Village in Turkey

Mirahmet
- Village
- Location in Turkey
- Coordinates: 38°53′N 39°58′E
- Country: Turkey
- Province: Elazığ
- District: Karakoçan
- Population (2021): 113
- Time zone: UTC+3 (TRT)

Mirahmet (Kurdish: Mîr Ehmed) is a village in the Karakoçan District of Elazığ Province in Turkey. Its population is 113 (2021). The village is populated by Kurds.
