= Çatakbaşı, Kovancılar =

Village in Turkey

Çatakbaşı
- Village
- Location in Turkey
- Coordinates: 38°42′N 39°35′E
- Country: Turkey
- Province: Elazığ
- District: Kovancılar
- Population (2021): 103
- Time zone: UTC+3 (TRT)

Çatakbaşı is a village in the Kovancılar District of Elazığ Province in Turkey. Its population is 103 (2021).
