= Kolluca, Kovancılar =

Village in Turkey

Kolluca
- Village
- Location in Turkey
- Coordinates: 38°43′25″N 39°37′27″E
- Country: Turkey
- Province: Elazığ
- District: Kovancılar
- Population (2021): 73
- Time zone: UTC+3 (TRT)

Kolluca is a village in the Kovancılar District of Elazığ Province in Turkey. Its population is 73 (2021).
