= Soğanlı, Kovancılar =

Village in Turkey

Soğanlı
- Village
- Location in Turkey
- Coordinates: 38.7574°N 39.6153°E
- Country: Turkey
- Province: Elazığ
- District: Kovancılar
- Population (2021): 64
- Time zone: UTC+3 (TRT)

Soğanlı is a village in the Kovancılar District of Elazığ Province in Turkey. Its population is 64 (2021).
