= Aşağıdemirci, Kovancılar =

Village in Turkey

Aşağıdemirci
- Village
- Location in Turkey
- Coordinates: 38.8477°N 40.1416°E
- Country: Turkey
- Province: Elazığ
- District: Kovancılar
- Population (2021): 14
- Time zone: UTC+3 (TRT)

Aşağıdemirci is a village in the Kovancılar District of Elazığ Province in Turkey. Its population is 14 (2021).
