= Kızılca, Karakoçan =

Village in Turkey

Kızılca
- Village
- Location in Turkey
- Coordinates: 38°59′56″N 39°59′10″E
- Country: Turkey
- Province: Elazığ
- District: Karakoçan
- Population (2021): 182
- Time zone: UTC+3 (TRT)

Kızılca (Kurdish: Qizilce) is a village in the Karakoçan District of Elazığ Province in Turkey. Its population is 182 (2021). The village is populated by Kurds of the Şadiyan tribe.
