= Doğanoğlu, Karakoçan =

Village in Turkey

Doğanoğlu
- Village
- Location in Turkey
- Coordinates: 39°5′15″N 40°4′37″E
- Country: Turkey
- Province: Elazığ
- District: Karakoçan
- Population (2021): 87
- Time zone: UTC+3 (TRT)

Doğanoğlu (Kurdish: Kurikanê gaz) is a village in the Karakoçan District of Elazığ Province in Turkey. Its population is 87 (2021). The village is populated by Kurds.
