= Sarıcan =

- Municipality
- Location in Turkey
- Coordinates: 38°54′07″N 40°08′10″E
- Country: Turkey
- Province: Elazığ
- District: Karakoçan
- Population (2021): 2,173
- Time zone: UTC+3 (TRT)

Sarıcan (Kurdish: Sarcon) is a town (belde) in Karakoçan District, Elazığ Province, Turkey. Its population is 2,173 (2021). It is populated by Kurds of the Bekiran tribe.
