= Aşağıovacık, Karakoçan =

Village in Turkey

Aşağıovacık
- Village
- Location within Turkey
- Coordinates: 38.8697°N 39.9935°E
- Country: Turkey
- Province: Elazığ
- District: Karakoçan
- Population (2021): 131
- Time zone: UTC+3 (TRT)

Aşağıovacık (Kurdish: Kurikanê jêrin) is a village in the Karakoçan District of Elazığ Province in Turkey. Its population is 131 (2021). The village is populated by Kurds.
