= Çan, Karakoçan =

Village in Turkey

Çan
- Village
- Location in Turkey
- Coordinates: 39.155°N 40.2122°E
- Country: Turkey
- Province: Elazığ
- District: Karakoçan
- Population (2021): 49
- Time zone: UTC+3 (TRT)

Çan is a village in the Karakoçan District of Elazığ Province in Turkey. Its population is 49 (2021). The village is populated by Kurds of the Şadiyan tribe.
