= Payamlı, Kovancılar =

Village in Turkey

Payamlı
- Village
- Location in Turkey
- Coordinates: 38°48′2″N 39°51′6″E
- Country: Turkey
- Province: Elazığ
- District: Kovancılar
- Population (2021): 55
- Time zone: UTC+3 (TRT)

Payamlı is a village in the Kovancılar District of Elazığ Province in Turkey. Its population is 55 (2021). The village is populated by Kurds.
