= Güllüce, Karakoçan =

Village in Turkey

Güllüce
- Village
- Location in Turkey
- Coordinates: 38°49′16″N 39°59′56″E
- Country: Turkey
- Province: Elazığ
- District: Karakoçan
- Population (2021): 53
- Time zone: UTC+3 (TRT)

Güllüce (Kurdish: Gulîce) is a village in the Karakoçan District of Elazığ Province in Turkey. Its population is 53 (2021). The village is populated by Kurds.
