= Yukarıkanatlı, Kovancılar =

Village in Turkey

Yukarıkanatlı
- Village
- Location in Turkey
- Coordinates: 38°51′32″N 40°5′35″E
- Country: Turkey
- Province: Elazığ
- District: Kovancılar
- Population (2021): 60
- Time zone: UTC+3 (TRT)

Yukarıkanatlı is a village in the Kovancılar District of Elazığ Province in Turkey. Its population is 60 (2021).
