= Kalecik, Karakoçan =

Village in Turkey

Kalecik
- Village
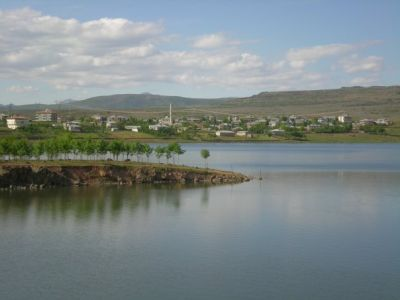

- Location within Turkey
- Coordinates: 38°57′56″N 40°3′41″E
- Country: Turkey
- Province: Elazığ
- District: Karakoçan
- Population (2021): 335
- Time zone: UTC+3 (TRT)

Kalecik (Kurdish: Qelecox) is a village in the Karakoçan District of Elazığ Province in Turkey. Its population is 335 (2021). The village is populated by Kurds.
