= Yukarıdemirli, Kovancılar =

Village in Turkey

Yukarıdemirli
- Village
- Location in Turkey
- Coordinates: 38°52′18″N 40°11′0″E
- Country: Turkey
- Province: Elazığ
- District: Kovancılar
- Population (2021): 67
- Time zone: UTC+3 (TRT)

Yukarıdemirli is a village in the Kovancılar District of Elazığ Province in Turkey. Its population is 67 (2021).
