= İğdeli, Kovancılar =

Village in Turkey

İğdeli
- Village
- Location in Turkey
- Coordinates: 38°44′24″N 39°42′25″E
- Country: Turkey
- Province: Elazığ
- District: Kovancılar
- Population (2021): 91
- Time zone: UTC+3 (TRT)

İğdeli (Kurdish: Sorikan) is a village in the Kovancılar District of Elazığ Province in Turkey. Its population is 91 (2021). The village is populated by Kurds of the Beritan tribe.
