= Yeniköy, Karakoçan =

Village in Turkey

Yeniköy
- Village
- Location in Turkey
- Coordinates: 38°54′50″N 40°3′32″E
- Country: Turkey
- Province: Elazığ
- District: Karakoçan
- Population (2021): 315
- Time zone: UTC+3 (TRT)

Yeniköy is a village in the Karakoçan District of Elazığ Province in Turkey. Its population is 315 (2021). The village is populated by Kurds of the Şadiyan tribe.
