= Çayırdam, Karakoçan =

Village in Turkey

Çayırdam
- Village
- Location in Turkey
- Coordinates: 38°51′N 40°01′E
- Country: Turkey
- Province: Elazığ
- District: Karakoçan
- Population (2021): 122
- Time zone: UTC+3 (TRT)

Çayırdam (Kurdish: Lexanê jorin) is a village in the Karakoçan District of Elazığ Province in Turkey. Its population is 122 (2021). The village is populated by Kurds.
