= Okçular, Kovancılar =

Village in Turkey

Okçular
- Village
- Location in Turkey
- Coordinates: 38°51′33″N 40°6′59″E
- Country: Turkey
- Province: Elazığ
- District: Kovancılar
- Population (2021): 655
- Time zone: UTC+3 (TRT)

Okçular is a village in the Kovancılar District of Elazığ Province in Turkey. Its population is 655 (2021).
