= Gülçatı, Kovancılar =

Village in Turkey

Gülçatı
- Village
- Location in Turkey
- Coordinates: 38°43′N 39°43′E
- Country: Turkey
- Province: Elazığ
- District: Kovancılar
- Population (2021): 305
- Time zone: UTC+3 (TRT)

Gülçatı (Kurdish: Kirve) is a village in the Kovancılar District of Elazığ Province in Turkey. Its population is 305 (2021). The village is populated by Kurds of the Beritan tribe.
