= Bardaklı, Karakoçan =

Village in Turkey

Bardaklı
- Village
- Location in Turkey
- Coordinates: 38.9347°N 39.8805°E
- Country: Turkey
- Province: Elazığ
- District: Karakoçan
- Population (2021): 41
- Time zone: UTC+3 (TRT)

Bardaklı (Kurdish: Qela mezin) is a village in the Karakoçan District of Elazığ Province in Turkey. Its population is 41 (2021). The village is populated by Kurds of the Izol tribe.
