= Beydere, Karakoçan =

Village in Turkey

Beydere
- Village
- Location in Turkey
- Coordinates: 39.0551°N 40.0653°E
- Country: Turkey
- Province: Elazığ
- District: Karakoçan
- Population (2021): 62
- Time zone: UTC+3 (TRT)

Beydere (Kurdish: Beydeve) is a village in the Karakoçan District of Elazığ Province in Turkey. Its population is 62 (2021). The village is populated by Kurds.
