= Tavros, Cyprus =

Tavros: Ταύρος (Greek); Pamuklu (Turkish)
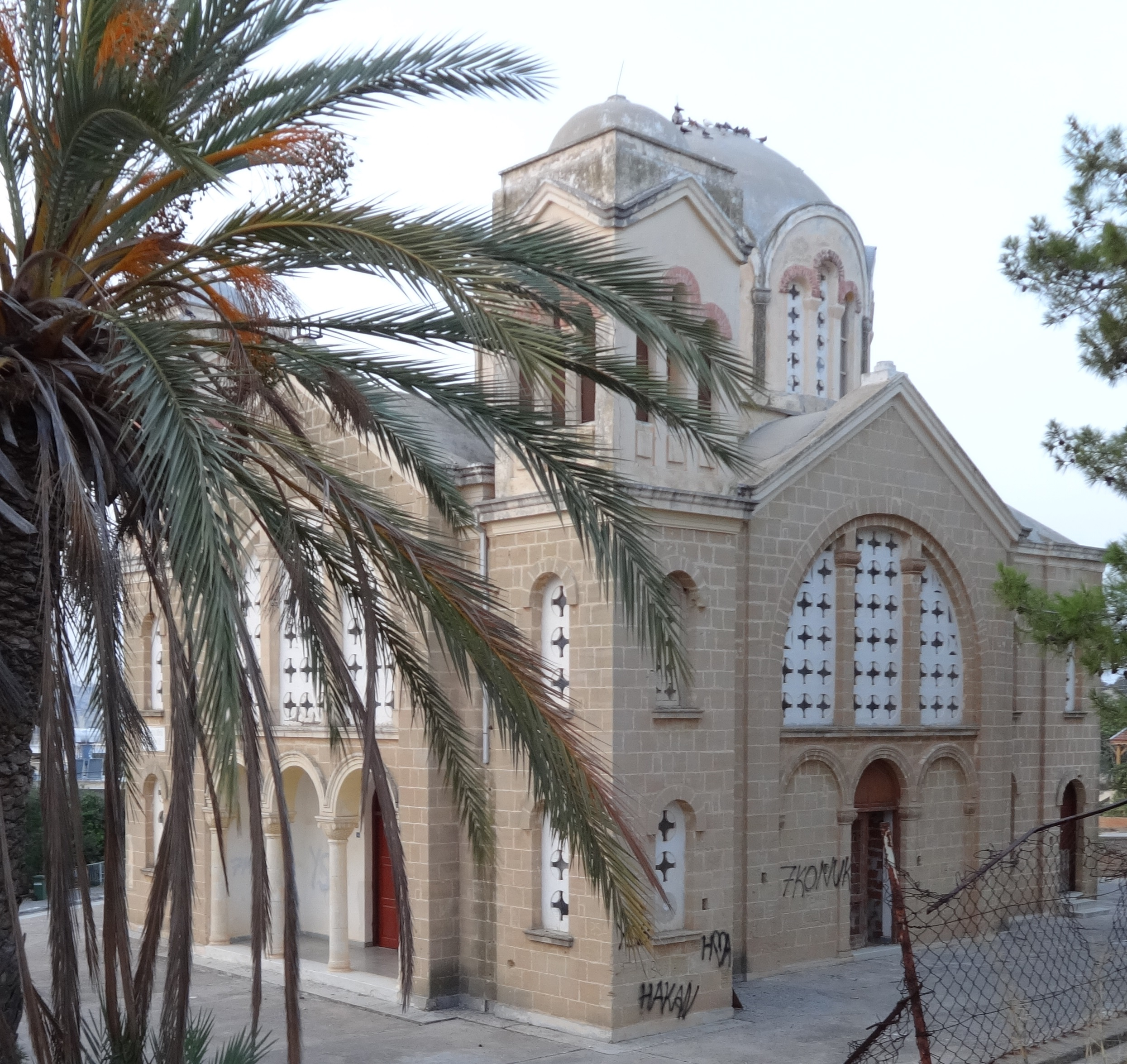
- Ayios Sergios

- Location in Cyprus
- Coordinates: 35°23′49″N 34°4′34″E
- Country (de jure): Cyprus
  - District: Famagusta District
- Country (de facto): Northern Cyprus
  - District: İskele District

Government
  - Mukhtar: Hasan Çelik

Population (2011)
  - Total: 280
- Time zone: UTC+2 (EET)
  - Summer (DST): UTC+3 (EEST)

Tavros (Greek: Ταύρος, literally 'Bull', Turkish: Pamuklu) is a village in the Famagusta District of Cyprus, located on the Karpass Peninsula. It is in the southern part of the peninsula between Bogaz and Koma Yialou (Kumyali), 1.5 miles from the peninsula's south coast. It is under the de facto control of Northern Cyprus.

New mosque, opposite the church, on the north side of the old Nicosia-Karpas road

Until the invasion, Tavros was inhabited by Greek Cypriots. In 1891, the village population was 138 Greek Cypriots. Ten years later there were 167 Greek Cypriots. By 1960 there were 311 Greek Cypriots and 1 Turkish Cypriot.

During the invasion, in August 1974, most of the population fled southwards. 47 people attempted to remain and they were enclaved in Tavros until they were forced to move out of the Turkish sector of Cyprus in August 1976. Meanwhile, the village was given in 1975 the new Turkish name of Pamuklu, which means “place with cotton” or “made of cotton.”. Then in 1976–77, the village was settled with people from Giresun and Ordu in the Pontus region of Turkey and also from Yozgat Province just east of Ankara.

This village population in 2011 was 280, an increase from 256 in 2006.

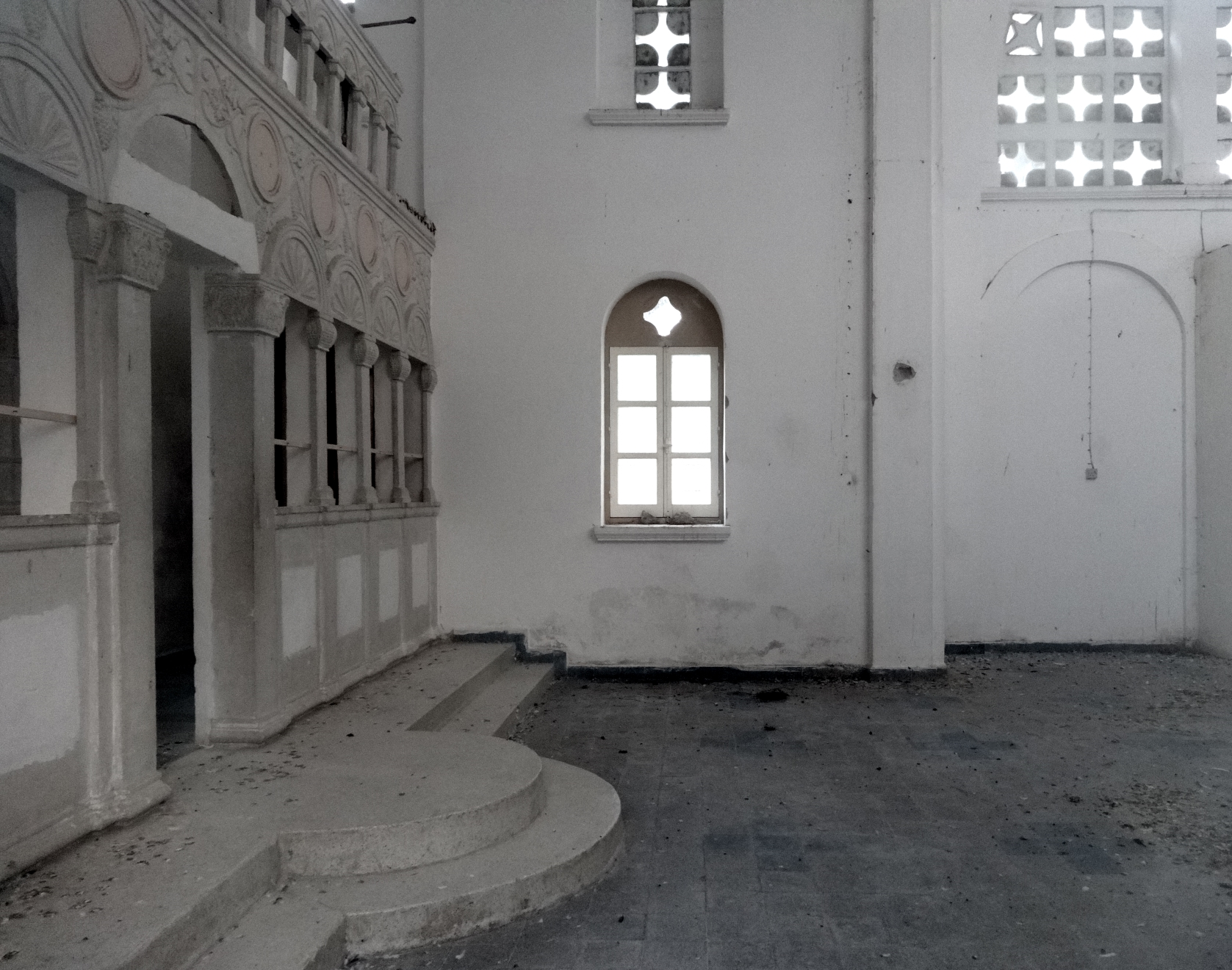
Interior of Ayios Sergios

The church of Ayios Sergios is situated at the east end of the village, on the old Nicosia-Karpas road. The new Nicosia-Karpas road bypasses the village on the north side.
