= Çakırkaş, Kovancılar =

Village in Turkey

Çakırkaş
- Village
- Location in Turkey
- Coordinates: 38°46′N 39°58′E
- Country: Turkey
- Province: Elazığ
- District: Kovancılar
- Population (2021): 1,230
- Time zone: UTC+3 (TRT)

Çakırkaş is a village in the Kovancılar District of Elazığ Province in Turkey. Its population is 1,230 (2021). Before the 2013 reorganisation, it was a town (belde).
