= Taşçanak, Kovancılar =

Village in Turkey

Taşçanak
- Village
- Location in Turkey
- Coordinates: 38°42′47″N 39°49′4″E
- Country: Turkey
- Province: Elazığ
- District: Kovancılar
- Population (2021): 34
- Time zone: UTC+3 (TRT)

Taşçanak is a village in the Kovancılar District of Elazığ Province in Turkey. Its population is 34 (2021).
