= Şekerci, Kovancılar =

Village in Turkey

Şekerci
- Village
- Location in Turkey
- Coordinates: 38.7355°N 39.5936°E
- Country: Turkey
- Province: Elazığ
- District: Kovancılar
- Population (2021): 114
- Time zone: UTC+3 (TRT)

Şekerci is a village in the Kovancılar District of Elazığ Province in Turkey. Its population is 114 (2021).
