= Yoğunağaç, Karakoçan =

Village in Turkey

Yoğunağaç
- Village
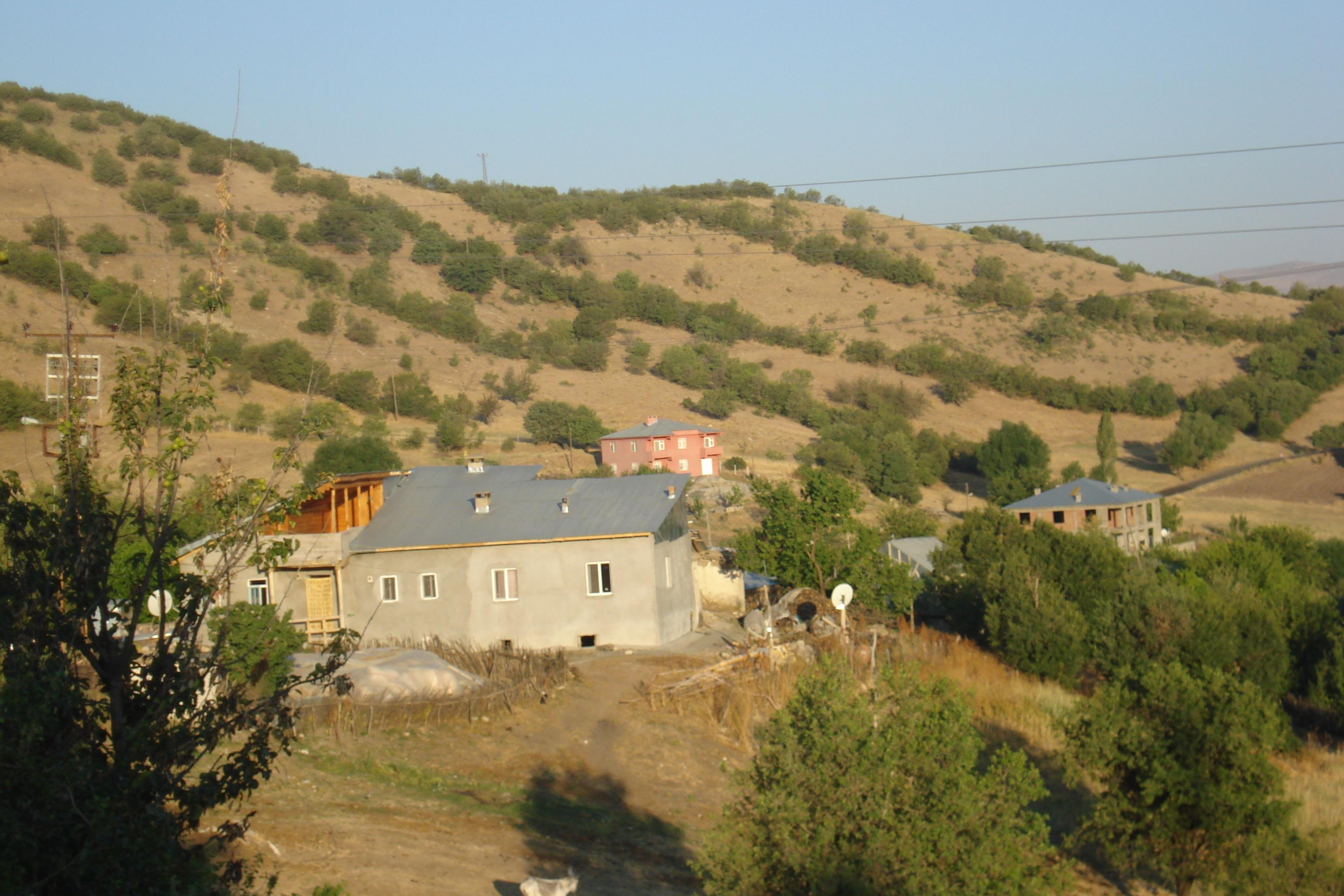

- Location within Turkey
- Coordinates: 38°58′53″N 39°53′30″E
- Country: Turkey
- Province: Elazığ
- District: Karakoçan
- Population (2021): 70
- Time zone: UTC+3 (TRT)

Yoğunağaç (Kurdish: Golan) is a village in the Karakoçan District of Elazığ Province in Turkey. Its population is 70 (2021). The village is populated by Kurds of the Izol tribe.
