= Akbulak, Karakoçan =

Village in Turkey

Akbulak
- Village
- Location in Turkey
- Coordinates: 38.8578°N 39.9076°E
- Country: Turkey
- Province: Elazığ
- District: Karakoçan
- Population (2021): 101
- Time zone: UTC+3 (TRT)

Akbulak is a village in the Karakoçan District of Elazığ Province in Turkey. Its population is 101 (2021). The village is populated by Kurds of the Izol tribe.
