= Akyokuş, Karakoçan =

Village in Elazığ Province, Turkey

Akyokuş
- Village
- Location in Turkey
- Coordinates: 38.8525°N 39.8651°E
- Country: Turkey
- Province: Elazığ
- District: Karakoçan
- Population (2021): 67
- Time zone: UTC+3 (TRT)

Akyokuş (Kurdish: Ferxo) is a village in the Karakoçan District of Elazığ Province in Turkey. The village is populated by Kurds of the Izol tribe and had a population of 67 in 2021.
