= Avlağı, Kovancılar =

Village in Turkey

Avlağı
- Village
- Location in Turkey
- Coordinates: 38.7156°N 39.6790°E
- Country: Turkey
- Province: Elazığ
- District: Kovancılar
- Population (2021): 238
- Time zone: UTC+3 (TRT)

Avlağı (Armenian: Avlavi) (Note: Also known as Avlaghi, Avlavou, Awlaghi.) is a village in the Kovancılar District of Elazığ Province in Turkey. Its population is 238 (2021).

== History ==
Avlavi (today called Avlağı) was historically inhabited by Armenians. It was located in the kaza (district) of Palu in the sanjak of Maden in the Diyarbekir vilayet in c. 1900. It was populated by 130 Armenians in 19 homes in 1914. The village was attacked by çetes in the first half of June 1915 amidst the Armenian genocide.

== Bibliography ==
- Jongerden, Joost; Verheij, Jelle, eds. (2012). Social Relations in Ottoman Diyarbekir, 1870-1915. Brill.
- Kévorkian, Raymond H. (2006). "Demographic Changes in the Armenian Population of Diarbekir, 1895-1914". In Richard G. Hovannisian (ed.). Armenian Tigranakert/Diarbekir and Edessa/Urfa. Mazda Publishers.
- Kévorkian, Raymond (2011). The Armenian Genocide: A Complete History. I.B. Tauris.
