= Karaçan, Karakoçan =

Village in Turkey

Karaçan
- Village
- Location in Turkey
- Coordinates: 39°8′41″N 40°13′6″E
- Country: Turkey
- Province: Elazığ
- District: Karakoçan
- Population (2021): 24
- Time zone: UTC+3 (TRT)

Karaçan is a village in the Karakoçan District of Elazığ Province in Turkey. Its population is 24 (2021). The village is populated by Kurds.
