= Sağın, Karakoçan =

Village in Turkey

Sağın
- Village
- Location in Turkey
- Coordinates: 38°54′48″N 39°55′49″E
- Country: Turkey
- Province: Elazığ
- District: Karakoçan
- Population (2021): 173
- Time zone: UTC+3 (TRT)

Sağın (Kurdish: Saxin) is a village in the Karakoçan District of Elazığ Province in Turkey. Its population is 173 (2021). The village is populated by Kurds.
