= Sarıbuğday, Kovancılar =

Village in Turkey

Sarıbuğday
- Village
- Location in Turkey
- Coordinates: 38°45′57″N 40°1′20″E
- Country: Turkey
- Province: Elazığ
- District: Kovancılar
- Population (2021): 100
- Time zone: UTC+3 (TRT)

Sarıbuğday is a village in the Kovancılar District of Elazığ Province in Turkey. Its population is 100 (2021).
