= İsabey, Karakoçan =

Village in Turkey

İsabey
- Village
- Location in Turkey
- Coordinates: 38°50′45″N 39°53′11″E
- Country: Turkey
- Province: Elazığ
- District: Karakoçan
- Population (2021): 64
- Time zone: UTC+3 (TRT)

İsabey (Kurdish: Îsabeg) is a village in the Karakoçan District of Elazığ Province in Turkey. Its population is 64 (2021). The village is populated by Kurds of the Izol tribe.
