= Alabal, Karakoçan =

Village in Turkey

Alabal
- Village
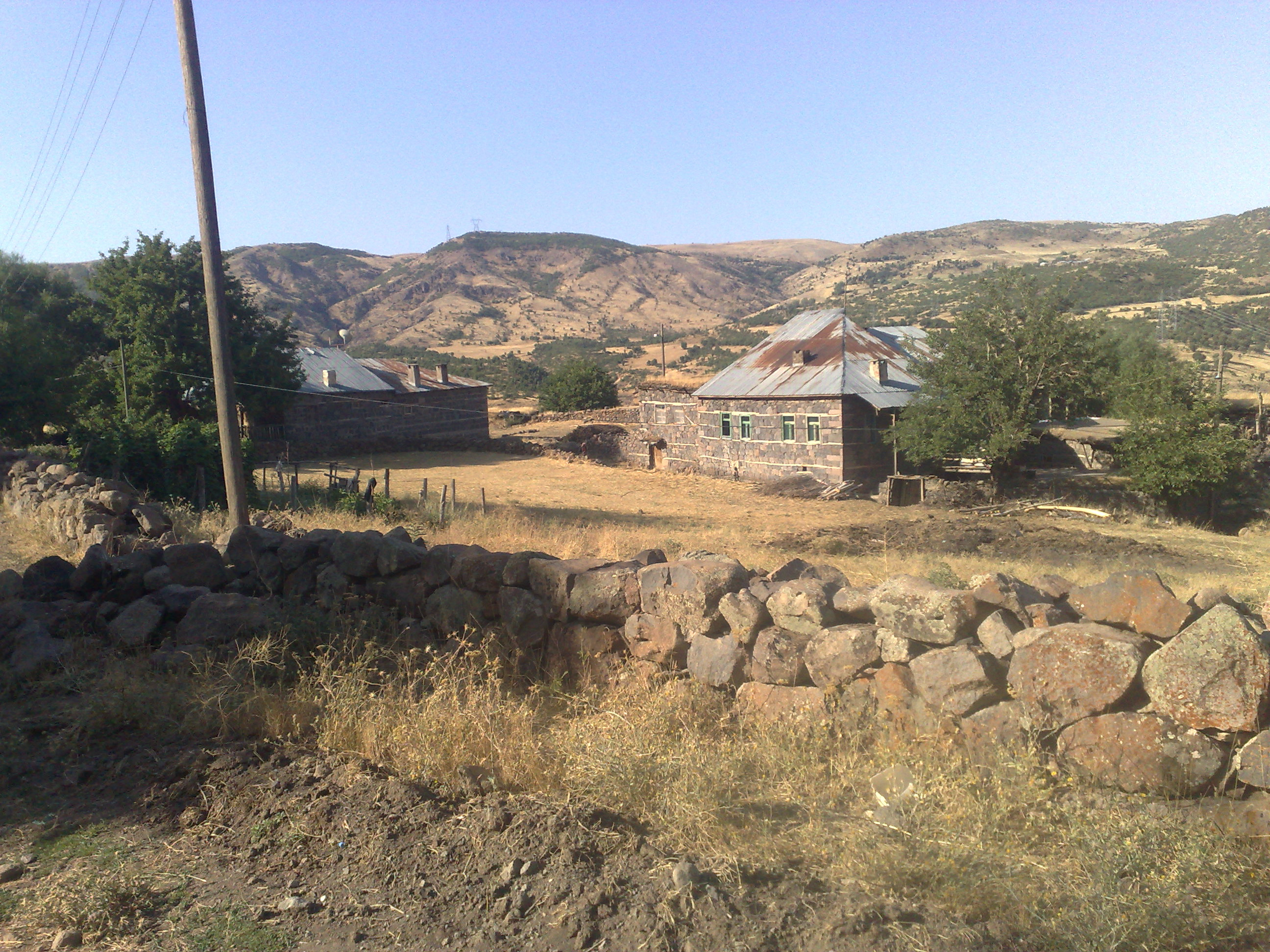

- Location within Turkey
- Coordinates: 39.1051°N 40.0894°E
- Country: Turkey
- Province: Elazığ
- District: Karakoçan
- Population (2021): 73
- Time zone: UTC+3 (TRT)

Alabal (Kurdish: Beroj) is a village in the Karakoçan District of Elazığ Province in Turkey. Its population is 73 (2021). The village is populated by Kurds of the Şadiyan tribe.
