= Salkımlı, Kovancılar =

Village in Turkey

Salkımlı
- Village
- Location in Turkey
- Coordinates: 38°41′27″N 39°38′34″E
- Country: Turkey
- Province: Elazığ
- District: Kovancılar
- Population (2021): 42
- Time zone: UTC+3 (TRT)

Salkımlı is a village in the Kovancılar District of Elazığ Province in Turkey. Its population is 42 (2021).
