= Topağaç, Kovancılar =

Village in Turkey

Topağaç
- Village
- Location in Turkey
- Coordinates: 38°43′49″N 39°39′33″E
- Country: Turkey
- Province: Elazığ
- District: Kovancılar
- Population (2021): 289
- Time zone: UTC+3 (TRT)

Topağaç is a village in the Kovancılar District of Elazığ Province in Turkey. Its population is 289 (2021).
