= Kalkankaya, Karakoçan =

Village in Turkey

Kalkankaya
- Village
- Location in Turkey
- Coordinates: 38°57′3″N 40°5′58″E
- Country: Turkey
- Province: Elazığ
- District: Karakoçan
- Population (2021): 158
- Time zone: UTC+3 (TRT)

Kalkankaya (Kurdish: Girbo) is a village in the Karakoçan District of Elazığ Province in Turkey. Its population is 158 (2021). The village is populated by Kurds of the Bekiran tribe.
