= Pamuklu, Karakoçan =

Village in Turkey

Pamuklu
- Village
- Location in Turkey
- Coordinates: 39°3′34″N 39°52′39″E
- Country: Turkey
- Province: Elazığ
- District: Karakoçan
- Population (2021): 38
- Time zone: UTC+3 (TRT)

Pamuklu (Kurdish: Seymamudan) is a village in the Karakoçan District of Elazığ Province in Turkey. Its population is 38 (2021). The village is populated by Kurds.
