= Hamurkesen, Karakoçan =

Village in Turkey

Hamurkesen
- Village
- Location in Turkey
- Coordinates: 39°5′43″N 40°6′21″E
- Country: Turkey
- Province: Elazığ
- District: Karakoçan
- Population (2021): 37
- Time zone: UTC+3 (TRT)

Hamurkesen is a village in the Karakoçan District of Elazığ Province in Turkey. Its population is 37 (2021). The village is populated by Kurds of the Şadiyan tribe.
