= Kaçar =

Kaçar is a Turkish surname. Notable people with the surname include:

- Betül Kaçar, Turkish American academic
- Giray Kaçar (born 1985), Turkish footballer
- Hasan Hüseyin Kaçar (born 1988), Turkish disabled middle and long distance runner
