= Kacar, Kovancılar =

Village in Turkey

Kacar
- Village
- Location in Turkey
- Coordinates: 38°42′36″N 39°36′54″E
- Country: Turkey
- Province: Elazığ
- District: Kovancılar
- Population (2021): 94
- Time zone: UTC+3 (TRT)

Kacar (also: Kaçar) is a village in the Kovancılar District of Elazığ Province in Turkey. Its population is 94 (2021).
