= Yenidam, Kovancılar =

Village in Turkey

Yenidam
- Village
- Location in Turkey
- Coordinates: 38°48′54″N 39°44′33″E
- Country: Turkey
- Province: Elazığ
- District: Kovancılar
- Population (2021): 49
- Time zone: UTC+3 (TRT)

Yenidam is a village in the Kovancılar District of Elazığ Province in Turkey. Its population is 49 (2021).
