= Sarıbaşak, Karakoçan =

Village in Turkey

Sarıbaşak
- Village
- Location in Turkey
- Coordinates: 39°4′42″N 40°8′27″E
- Country: Turkey
- Province: Elazığ
- District: Karakoçan
- Population (2021): 156
- Time zone: UTC+3 (TRT)

Sarıbaşak is a village in the Karakoçan District of Elazığ Province in Turkey. Its population is 156 (2021). The village is populated by Kurds.
