= Gümüşakar, Karakoçan =

Village in Turkey

Gümüşakar
- Village
- Location in Turkey
- Coordinates: 39°7′58″N 40°13′25″E
- Country: Turkey
- Province: Elazığ
- District: Karakoçan
- Population (2021): 21
- Time zone: UTC+3 (TRT)

Gümüşakar is a village in the Karakoçan District of Elazığ Province in Turkey. Its population is 21 (2021). The village is populated by Kurds.
