= Kovancılar =

- Municipality
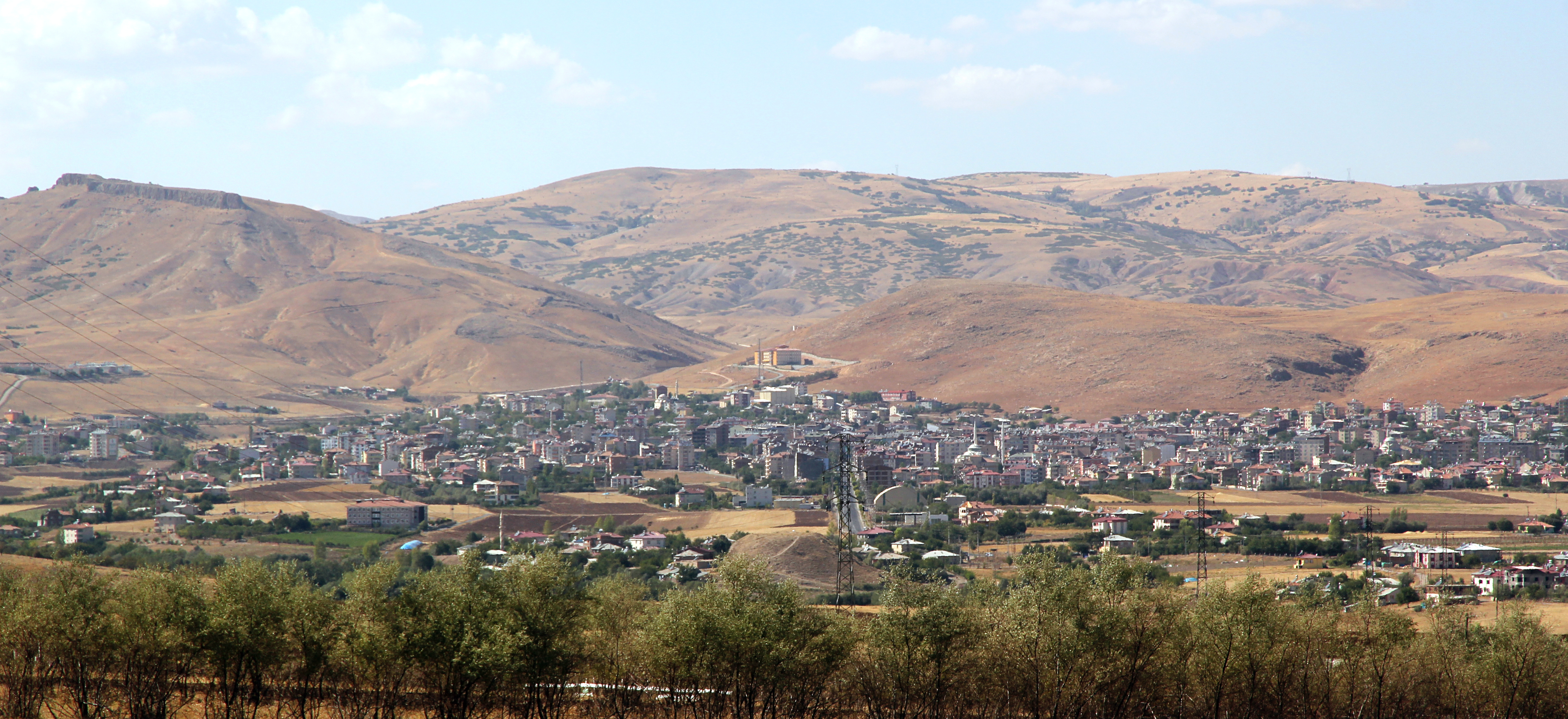

- Location within Turkey
- Coordinates: 38°43′18″N 39°52′02″E
- Country: Turkey
- Province: Elazığ
- District: Kovancılar

Government
  - Mayor: Vahap Gök (BBP)
- Elevation: 1,026 m (3,366 ft)
- Population (2021): 25,295
- Time zone: UTC+3 (TRT)
- Postal code: 23800
- Climate: Csa
- Website: www.kovancilar.bel.tr

Kovancılar (Kurdish: Qowançiyan) is a town in Elazığ Province of Turkey. It is the seat of Kovancılar District. Its population is 25,295 (2021). The mayor is Vahap Gök (BBP)

== History ==
Within the framework of the exchange agreement signed between Romania and Turkey in 1934, 300 Turkish families from Romania were transferred to the Elâzığ province. Due to the winter season, the immigrants were first subjected to temporary settlement in the surrounding villages and then settled in the current district center. In the spring of 1935, a new village of 300 households was established. This new settlement was named after Kovancılar, the village where the immigrants had resided in Romania. In 1935, the zoning plan of Kovancılar, which was built on a completely empty land, was prepared in the best way with the possibilities of that time and constituted an exemplary settlement in the province of Elâzığ.

In 1968, the municipal organization was established, and then with the law dated 19 June 1987 and numbered 3392, Kovancılar gained the status of district.

== Geography ==
Kovancılar is located on the 67th kilometer of the Elâzığ-Bingöl highway, on a flat area at the foot of Mount Şahmiran on the Euphrates, 1026 meters above sea level. Tunceli lies to the north, Karakoçan district to the east, Palu district to the south and Keban Dam Lake to the west. The area of the district is 980 km^{2} together with its villages. Since the region is located in the Taurus Mountains range, it is in the first degree earthquake zone.

The town consists of 13 quarters: Çarşıbaşı, Tuna, Bağlar, Fatih, Bahçelievler, Çaybaşı, Ismetpaşa, Heybet, Kapıaçmaz, Toki, Karacimşit, Gültepe and Yeni.
