= Karakoçan =

- Municipality
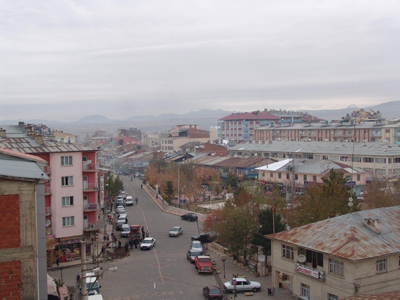

- Location within Turkey
- Coordinates: 38°57′N 40°02′E
- Country: Turkey
- Province: Elazığ
- District: Karakoçan

Government
  - Mayor: Cafer Oğur (DEM Party)
- Population (2021): 14,811
- Time zone: UTC+3 (TRT)
- Postal code: 23600
- Climate: Csa
- Website: www.karakocan.bel.tr

Karakoçan (Ottoman Turkish: تپه Tepe, Kurdish: Dep, Armenian: Oxi) is a town of Elazığ Province in the Eastern Anatolia region of Turkey. It is the seat of Karakoçan District. It is populated by Kurds and had a population of 14,811 in 2022.

The mayor is Cafer Oğur (DEM Party). Karakoçan is located on a stony plain that is watered by a stream that flows to the Peri Su. It is the successor of the ancient and medieval town of Bağın, located on the Peri Su to the northwest.

== Climate ==
Climate data for Karakoçan (1991–2020)
Month	Jan	Feb	Mar	Apr	May	Jun	Jul	Aug	Sep	Oct	Nov	Dec	Year
Mean daily maximum °C (°F)	2.6 (36.7)	4.6 (40.3)	11.0 (51.8)	17.2 (63.0)	22.9 (73.2)	29.3 (84.7)	33.9 (93.0)	34.4 (93.9)	29.3 (84.7)	22.0 (71.6)	12.5 (54.5)	5.1 (41.2)	18.7 (65.7)
Daily mean °C (°F)	−2.8 (27.0)	−1.3 (29.7)	−0.8 (30.6)	3.8 (38.8)	7.3 (45.1)	11.0 (51.8)	15.2 (59.4)	14.8 (58.6)	9.2 (48.6)	5.1 (41.2)	−0.6 (30.9)	−3.9 (25.0)	4.8 (40.6)
Mean daily minimum °C (°F)	−7.1 (19.2)	−6.1 (21.0)	−0.8 (30.6)	3.8 (38.8)	7.3 (45.1)	11.0 (51.8)	15.2 (59.4)	14.8 (58.6)	9.2 (48.6)	5.1 (41.2)	−0.6 (30.9)	−3.9 (25.0)	4.0 (39.2)
Average precipitation mm (inches)	67.19 (2.65)	64.44 (2.54)	84.1 (3.31)	93.02 (3.66)	68.45 (2.69)	21.47 (0.85)	7.46 (0.29)	3.56 (0.14)	12.27 (0.48)	63.46 (2.50)	63.16 (2.49)	76.38 (3.01)	624.96 (24.61)
Average precipitation days (≥ 1 mm)	8.4	8.8	10.3	11	8.7	3.8	2.4	1.3	2.2	6.5	7.2	8.6	79.2
Average relative humidity (%)	79	76.3	68.7	65.4	63.5	51	43.4	42.2	47.4	62.2	73.9	81	62.8
Source: NOAA
