= Karagedik =

Karagedik can refer to:

== Locations ==
- Karagedik, Baskil
- Karagedik, Gölbaşı

== People ==
- Kartal Karagedik, Turkish baritone
