= Hacımehmetli =

Hacımehmetli can refer to:

- Hacımehmetli, Alanya
- Hacımehmetli, Baskil
