= Akdemir =

Akdemir is a Turkish surname. Notable people with the name include:

== Surname ==
- Ali Akdemir, Turkish academic
- Diren Akdemir, Swiss-Turkish footballer

== Places ==
- Akdemir, Baskil
