= Kayabeyli railway station =

Train station in Karabeyli, Kirklareli, Turkey

KAYABEYLİ
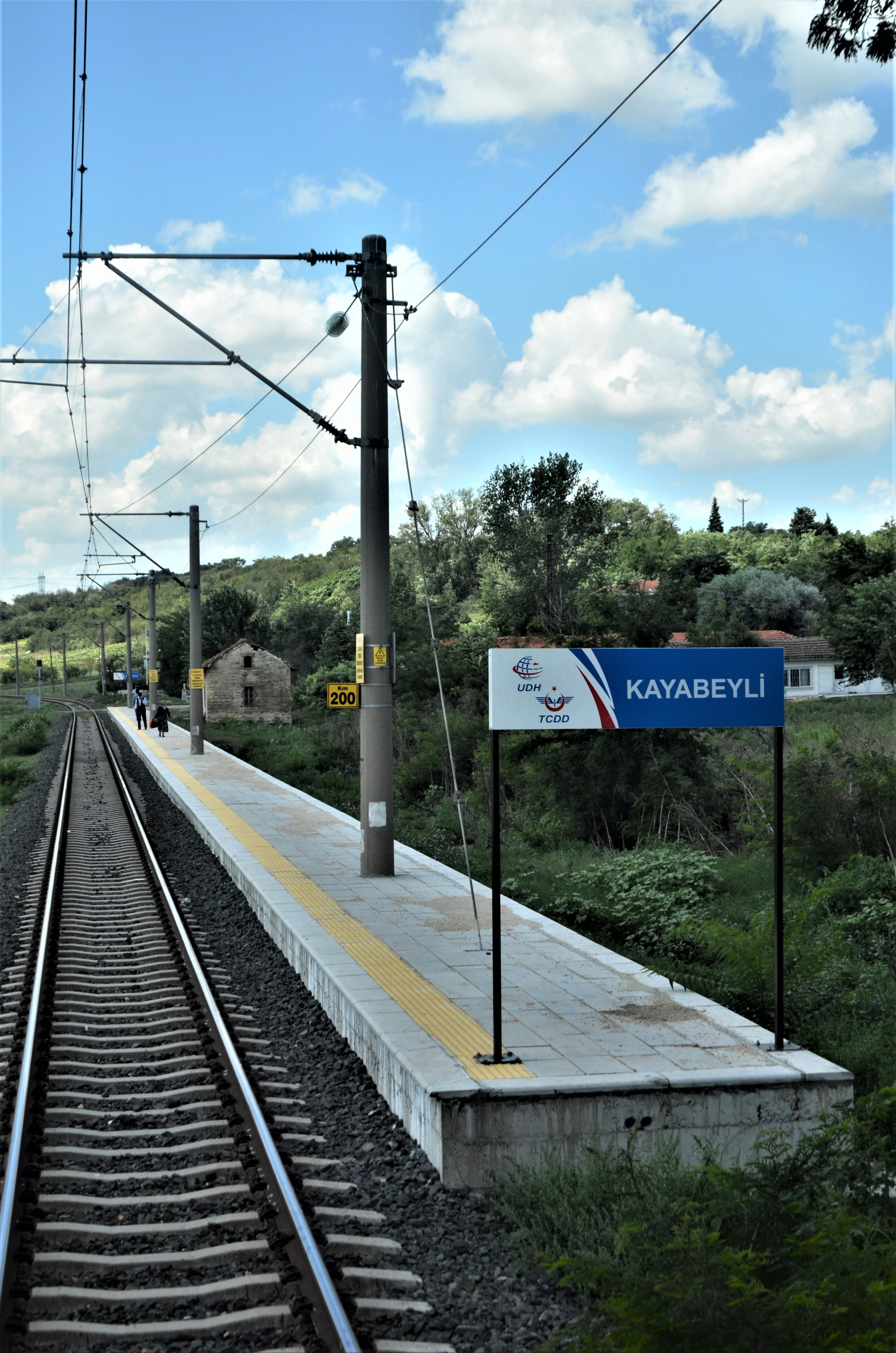

General information
- Location: Karabeyli Köyü 39750; Lüleburgaz, Kırklareli; Turkey
- Coordinates: 41.2972°N 27.4296°E
- System: TCDD regional rail station
- Owner: Turkish State Railways
- Operator: TCDD Taşımacılık
- Line: Istanbul–Pythio railway
- Platforms: 1 side platform
- Tracks: 1

Construction
- Structure type: At-grade

History
- Rebuilt: 2015

Services
Preceding station	TCDD Taşımacılık	Following station
Lüleburgaz towards Uzunköprü	Istanbul–Uzunköprü	Muratlı towards Istanbul
Location

Kayabeyli railway station (Turkish: Kayabeyli istasyonu) is a railway station in Kayabeyli, Kırklareli in Turkey. The station consists of a side platform serving one track. TCDD Taşımacılık operates a daily regional train from Istanbul to Kapıkule that stops at the station.
