= Sarıtaş, Baskil =

Village in Elazığ Province, Turkey

Sarıtaş
- Village
- Location in Turkey
- Coordinates: 38.428°N 38.935°E
- Country: Turkey
- Province: Elazığ
- District: Baskil
- Population (2021): 94
- Time zone: UTC+3 (TRT)

Sarıtaş (Kurdish: Şevalan) is a village in the Baskil District of Elazığ Province in Turkey. The village is populated by Kurds of the Parçikan tribe and had a population of 94 in 2021.

The hamlets of Ballıca, Bozarmut, Foduluşağı, Heybeli, Kalecik, Sekman and Taşören are attached to the village.
