= Tomáš Hanus =

Czech conductor

- Born: Brno, Czechoslovakia
- Education: Janáček Academy of Performing Arts
- Occupation: Conductor
- Organizations: National Theatre Brno; Welsh National Opera
- Website: www.tomashanus.com

Tomáš Hanus is a Czech conductor, who made an international career in Europe.

== Life and career ==
Hanus was born in Brno. He studied conducting at the Janáček Academy of Performing Arts of his hometown, with Jiří Bělohlávek. He was music director at the National Theatre Brno from 2007 to 2009, where he conducted Prokofiev's War and Peace and Rossini's La Cenerentola. Leading Janáček's From the House of the Dead at the 2018 Janáček Brno Festival earned him the 2018 Leoš Janáček Memorial Medal.

Hanus became music director of the Welsh National Opera from 2016 to 2026. He worked at the guest at the Staatsoper Stuttgart, the Semperoper in Dresden, the Bavarian State Opera in Munich, the Berlin State Opera, the Vienna State Opera, La Scala in Milan, the Paris Opera, the Teatro Real in Madrid, the Grand Théâtre de Genève, the Royal Danish Opera, and the Norwegian National Opera. He conducted the MDR Leipzig Radio Symphony Orchestra, the SWR Symphonieorchester, the Prague Symphony Orchestra, the London Symphony Orchestra and the BBC Symphony Orchestra, among others.

He conducted as the opening performance of the 2026–27 season at the Hamburg State Opera Verdi's Macbeth in a new production by intendant Tobias Kratzer, with Kartal Karagedik in the title role and Nino Machaidze as Lady Macbeth.
