= Konacık (disambiguation) =

Konacık can refer to:

- Konacık
- Konacık, Baskil
- Konacık, Gerger
- Konacık, Sur
