= Eskiköy, Baskil =

Village in Elazığ Province, Turkey

Eskiköy
- Village
- Location in Turkey
- Coordinates: 38.444°N 38.908°E
- Country: Turkey
- Province: Elazığ
- District: Baskil
- Population (2021): 105
- Time zone: UTC+3 (TRT)

Eskiköy (Kurdish: Delialan) is a village in the Baskil District of Elazığ Province in Turkey. The village is populated by Kurds of the Parçikan tribe and had a population of 105 in 2021.

The hamlets of Akbayır, Kanatlı and Yapraklı are attached to the village.
