= Kutlugün =

Kutlugün or Kutlugun may refer to:

- Kutlugün, Baskil, a village in the province of Elazığ, Turkey
- Kutlugün, Muş, a mountain in the province of Muş
