= Habibuşağı, Baskil =

Village in Elazığ Province, Turkey

Habibuşağı
- Village
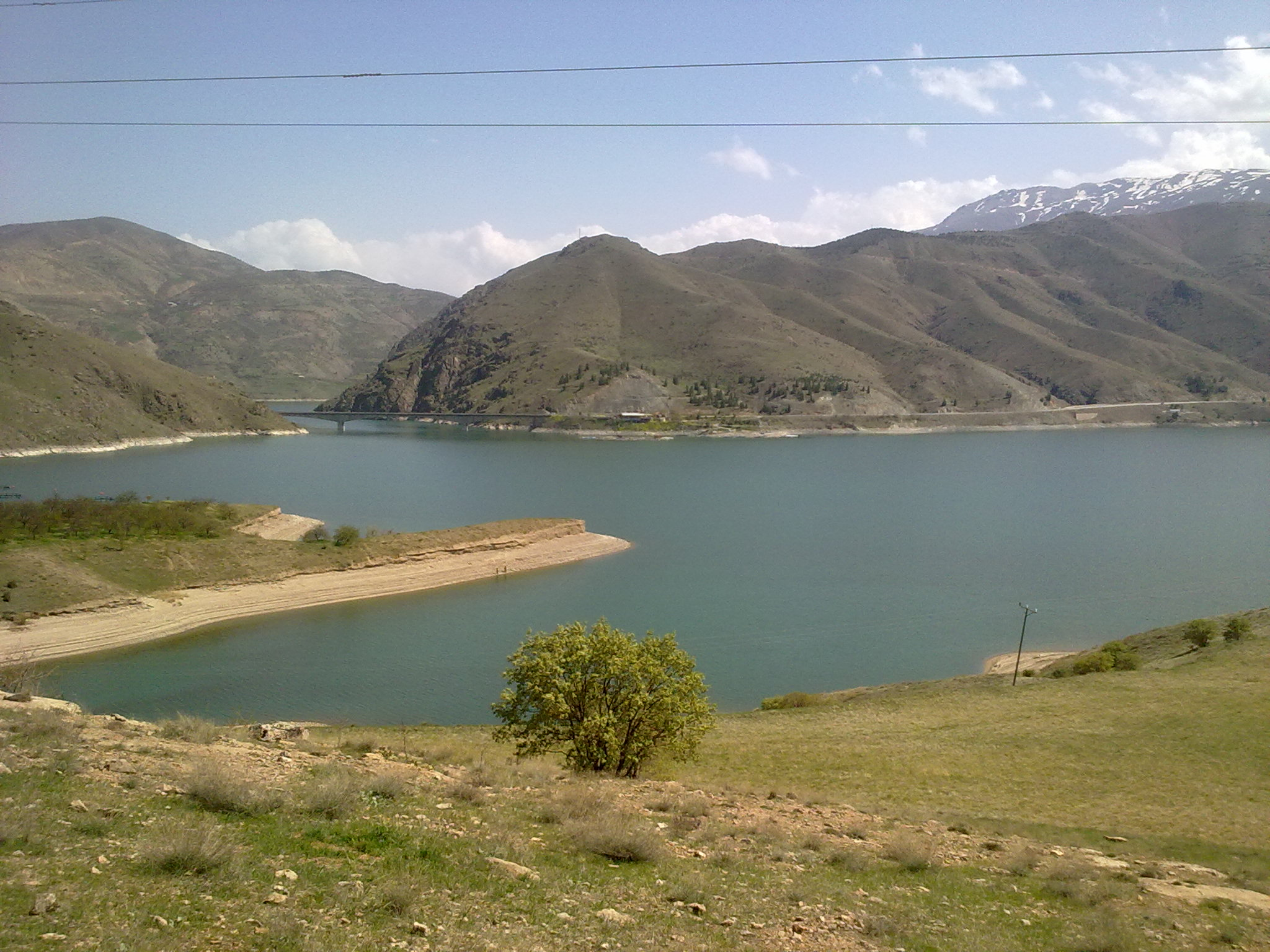

- Location within Turkey
- Coordinates: 38.442°N 38.781°E
- Country: Turkey
- Province: Elazığ
- District: Baskil
- Population (2021): 29
- Time zone: UTC+3 (TRT)

Habibuşağı is a village in the Baskil District of Elazığ Province in Turkey. The village is populated by Kurds of the Parçikan tribe and had a population of 29 in 2021.
