= Doğancık =

Doğancık can refer to:

- Doğancık, Baskil
- Doğancık, Sultandağı
