= Çalıca, Elazığ =

Village in Turkey

Çalıca
- Village
- Location within Turkey
- Coordinates: 38.5437°N 38.9917°E
- Country: Turkey
- Province: Elazığ
- District: Elazığ
- Population (2021): 158
- Time zone: UTC+3 (TRT)

Çalıca is a village in the Elazığ District of Elazığ Province in Turkey. Its population is 158 (2021). The village is populated by Kurds of the Parçikan tribe.
