= Lüleburgaz railway station =

Railway station in Turkey

LÜLEBURGAZ
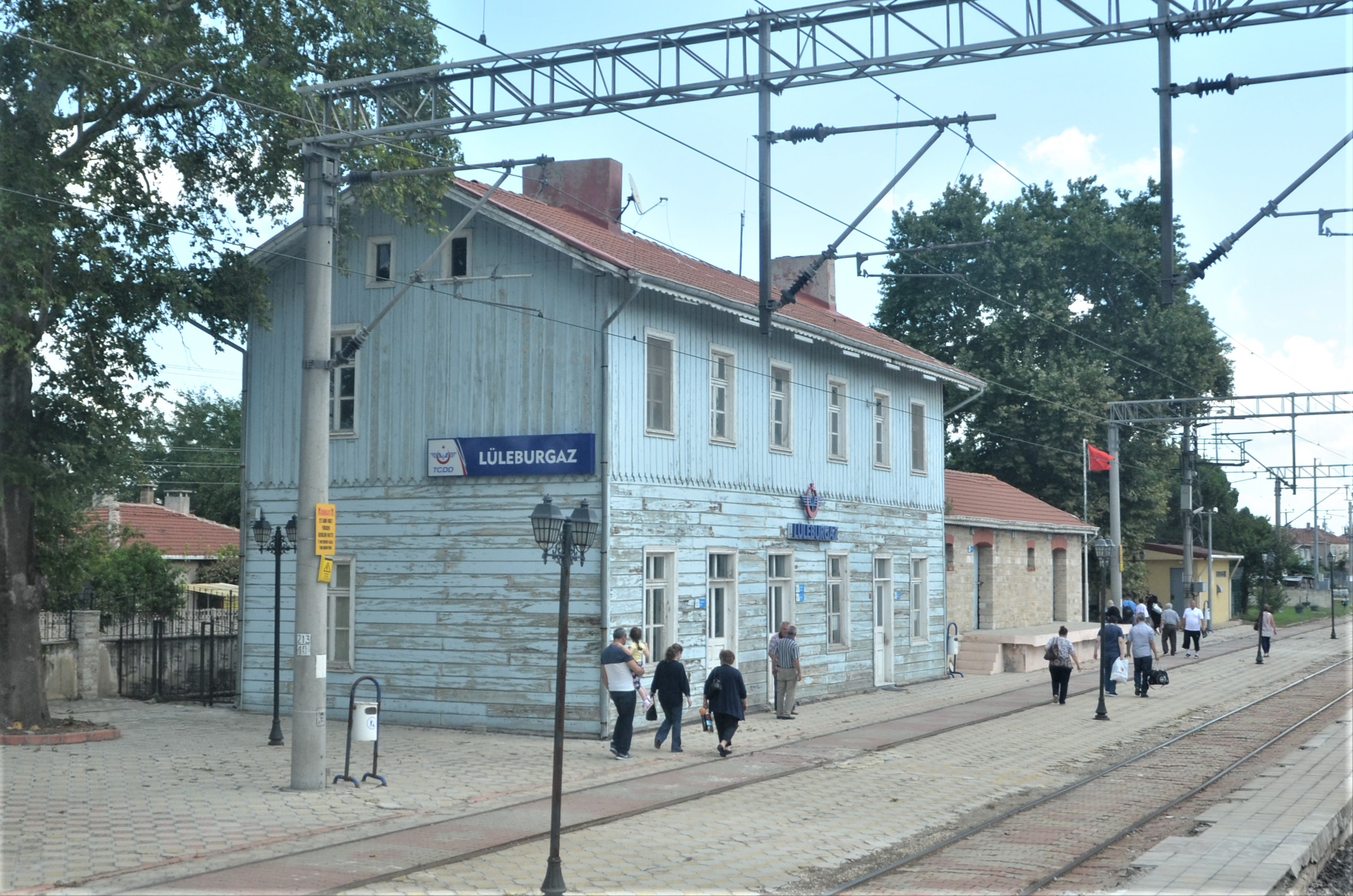
- Lüleburgaz railway stationpassengers.

General information
- Location: İstasyon Cd., Durak Mah., 39750; Lüleburgaz/Kırklareli; Turkey
- Coordinates: 41.3555°N 26.3326°E
- System: TCDD regional rail station
- Owner: Turkish State Railways
- Operator: TCDD Taşımacılık
- Line: Istanbul–Pythio railway
- Platforms: 3 (1 side platform, 2 island platforms)
- Tracks: 4

Construction
- Structure type: At-grade

History
- Opened: 4 April 1873

Services
Preceding station	TCDD Taşımacılık	Following station
Alpullu towards Uzunköprü	Istanbul–Uzunköprü	Kayabeyli towards Istanbul
Location

Lüleburgaz railway station (Turkish: Lüleburgaz istasyonu) is a station in the village Durak, Turkey. Despite carrying the town's name, the station is located about 5.9 km (3.7 mi) south of Lüleburgaz. Ever since the station was opened, a settlement began around its vicinity, which later became the village of Durak. TCDD Taşımacılık operates a daily regional train from Istanbul to Kapıkule, which stops at Lüleburgaz station.

The station was originally opened in 1873 by the Oriental Railway.

== Images ==
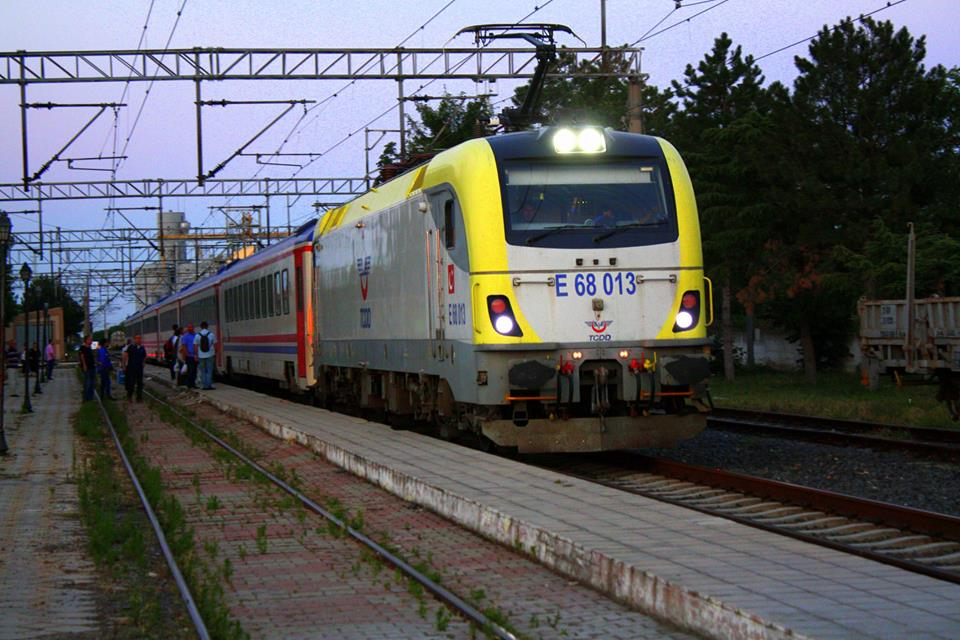
The Trakya Express at Lüleburgaz.
