= Çavuşlu, Baskil =

Village in Elazığ Province, Turkey

Çavuşlu
- Village
- Location in Turkey
- Coordinates: 38.491°N 38.878°E
- Country: Turkey
- Province: Elazığ
- District: Baskil
- Population (2021): 147
- Time zone: UTC+3 (TRT)

Çavuşlu (Kurdish: Werdixam) is a village in the Baskil District of Elazığ Province in Turkey. The village is populated by Kurds of the Parçikan tribe and had a population of 147 in 2021. The hamlet of Keuşağı is attached to the village.
