= Harabekayış, Baskil =

Village in Elazığ Province, Turkey

Harabekayış
- Village
- Location in Turkey
- Coordinates: 38.474°N 38.749°E
- Country: Turkey
- Province: Elazığ
- District: Baskil
- Population (2021): 139
- Time zone: UTC+3 (TRT)

Harabekayış (Kurdish: Xerab Qaiyş) is a village in the Baskil District of Elazığ Province in Turkey. The village is populated by Kurds of the Parçikan tribe and had a population of 139 in 2021.

The hamlets of Arutuşağı, Hacıbekir, Kardeşler, Körbekir, Oymaklı and Yazıkonak are attached to the village.
