= Düğüntepe, Baskil =

Village in Elazığ Province, Turkey

Düğüntepe
- Village
- Location in Turkey
- Coordinates: 38.557°N 38.872°E
- Country: Turkey
- Province: Elazığ
- District: Baskil
- Population (2021): 53
- Time zone: UTC+3 (TRT)

Düğüntepe (Kurdish: Girdikan) is a village in the Baskil District of Elazığ Province in Turkey. The village is populated by Kurds of the Parçikan tribe and had a population of 53 in 2021.

The hamlets of Kumluk, Kuzuşağı and Tavuklu are attached to the village.
