= Meydancık =

Meydancık (literally "little (city) square") is a Turkish place name and may refer to:

- Meydancık, Baskil
- Meydancık, Beşiri
- Meydancık, Şavşat, a village in the Şavşat district of Artvin Province
- Meydancık Castle, ruins of a castle in Gülnar district of Mersin Province
