= Bulutlu, Elazığ =

Village in Turkey

Bulutlu
- Village
- Location within Turkey
- Coordinates: 38.5529°N 38.9673°E
- Country: Turkey
- Province: Elazığ
- District: Elazığ
- Population (2021): 62
- Time zone: UTC+3 (TRT)

Bulutlu is a village in the Elazığ District of Elazığ Province in Turkey. Its population is 62 (2021). The village is populated by Kurds of the Parçikan tribe.
