= Günbağı, Elazığ =

Village in Turkey

Günbağı
- Village
- Location within Turkey
- Coordinates: 38.564°N 38.929°E
- Country: Turkey
- Province: Elazığ
- District: Elazığ
- Population (2021): 52
- Time zone: UTC+3 (TRT)

Günbağı is a village in the Elazığ District of Elazığ Province in Turkey. Its population is 52 (2021). The village is populated by Kurds of the Parçikan tribe.
