= Yolçatı, Elazığ =

Village in Turkey

Yolçatı
- Village
- Location within Turkey
- Coordinates: 38.539°N 39.031°E
- Country: Turkey
- Province: Elazığ
- District: Elazığ
- Population (2021): 168
- Time zone: UTC+3 (TRT)

Yolçatı is a village in the Elazığ District of Elazığ Province in Turkey. Its population is 168 (2021). The village is populated by Kurds of the Parçikan tribe.
