= Bozoğlak =

Bozoğlak can refer to:

- Bozoğlak, Baskil
- Bozoğlak, Kastamonu
- Bozoğlak, Kemah
