= Tatlıpayam, Baskil =

Village in Elazığ Province, Turkey

Tatlıpayam
- Village
- Location in Turkey
- Coordinates: 38.505°N 38.857°E
- Country: Turkey
- Province: Elazığ
- District: Baskil
- Population (2021): 72
- Time zone: UTC+3 (TRT)

Tatlıpayam (Kurdish: Sersuk) is a village in the Baskil District of Elazığ Province in Turkey. The village is populated by Kurds of the Parçikan tribe and had a population of 72 in 2021.

The hamlets of Kiziruşağı and Sincan are attached to the village.
