= Koçharmanı, Elazığ =

Village in Turkey

Koçharmanı
- Village
- Location within Turkey
- Coordinates: 38°28′50″N 38°56′25″E
- Country: Turkey
- Province: Elazığ
- District: Elazığ
- Population (2021): 113
- Time zone: UTC+3 (TRT)

Koçharmanı is a village in the Elazığ District of Elazığ Province in Turkey. Its population is 113 (2021). The village is populated by Kurds of the Parçikan tribe.
