= Yalındamlar, Elazığ =

Village in Turkey

Yalındamlar
- Village
- Location within Turkey
- Coordinates: 38°28′30″N 38°58′40″E
- Country: Turkey
- Province: Elazığ
- District: Elazığ
- Population (2021): 196
- Time zone: UTC+3 (TRT)

Yalındamlar is a village in the Elazığ District of Elazığ Province in Turkey. Its population is 196 (2021). The village is populated by Kurds from the Parçikan tribe.
