= Şahaplı, Elazığ =

Village in Turkey

Şahaplı
- Village
- Location within Turkey
- Coordinates: 38.571°N 38.995°E
- Country: Turkey
- Province: Elazığ
- District: Elazığ
- Population (2021): 54
- Time zone: UTC+3 (TRT)

Şahaplı is a village in the Elazığ District of Elazığ Province in Turkey. Its population is 54 (2021). The village is populated by Kurds of the Parçikan tribe.
