= Şahaplı =

Şahaplı can refer to:

- Şahaplı, Baskil
- Şahaplı, Elâzığ
