= Gözpınar, Elazığ =

Village in Turkey

Gözpınar
- Village
- Location within Turkey
- Coordinates: 38.519°N 39.006°E
- Country: Turkey
- Province: Elazığ
- District: Elazığ
- Population (2021): 89
- Time zone: UTC+3 (TRT)

Gözpınar is a village in the Elazığ District of Elazığ Province in Turkey. Its population is 89 (2021). The village is populated by Kurds of the Parçikan tribe.
