= Demirlibahçe, Baskil =

Village in Elazığ Province, Turkey

Demirlibahçe
- Village
- Location in Turkey
- Coordinates: 38.565°N 38.899°E
- Country: Turkey
- Province: Elazığ
- District: Baskil
- Population (2021): 76
- Time zone: UTC+3 (TRT)

Demirlibahçe (Kurdish: Molla Sorik) is a village in the Baskil District of Elazığ Province in Turkey. The village is populated by Kurds of the Parçikan tribe and had a population of 76 in 2021.
