= Karaali, Baskil =

Village in Elazığ Province, Turkey

Karaali
- Village
- Location in Turkey
- Coordinates: 38.476°N 38.910°E
- Country: Turkey
- Province: Elazığ
- District: Baskil
- Population (2021): 268
- Time zone: UTC+3 (TRT)

Karaali is a village in the Baskil District of Elazığ Province in Turkey. The village is populated by Kurds of the Parçikan tribe and had a population of 268 in 2021.

The hamlets of Buğular, Çakıllı, Çayırcık, Çitiluşağı, Dutluköy, Şimşeklir, Tekeli and Yoncalı are attached to the village.

== History ==
In June 2009, a 50 year-old mentally unstable villager killed six other inhabitants of the village aging from 12 to 80 years old with his shotgun.

The State Hydraulic Works agreed to build a irrigation pond near the village in March 2021. In August 2021, the Ministry of Agriculture and Forestry started to plant trees near the village, which is expected to form a forest of over 300 ha.
