= Topaluşağı =

Topaluşağı can refer to:

- Topaluşağı, Baskil
- Topaluşağı, Maden
- Topaluşağı, Sivrice
