= Konalga =

Konalga can refer to:

- Konalga, Baskil
- Konalga, Bitlis
