= Alatarla, Elazığ =

Village in Turkey

Alatarla
- Village
- Location in Turkey
- Coordinates: 38.8218°N 39.1227°E
- Country: Turkey
- Province: Elazığ
- District: Elazığ
- Population (2021): 161
- Time zone: UTC+3 (TRT)

Alatarla is a village in the Elazığ District of Elazığ Province in Turkey. Its population is 161 (2021). The village is populated by Kurds of the Parçikan tribe.
