= Aladikme, Baskil =

Village in Elazığ Province, Turkey

Aladikme
- Village
- Location in Turkey
- Coordinates: 38.4595°N 38.9184°E
- Country: Turkey
- Province: Elazığ
- District: Baskil
- Population (2021): 210
- Time zone: UTC+3 (TRT)

Aladikme is a village in the Baskil District of Elazığ Province in Turkey. The village is populated by Kurds of the Parçikan tribe and had a population of 210 in 2021. The hamlets of Aydoğan, Caddealtı, Cansızkayış, Çuğraş, Döşeli, Konacık, Kömürhan, Selvi and Ünsaldı are attached to the village.

Aladikme has a primary and a middle school. A forest fire broke out near the village on 9 August 2019, which was extinguished before 20 August.
