= Paşakonağı =

Paşakonağı can refer to:

- Paşakonağı, Baskil
- Paşakonağı, Düzce
