= Beşbölük, Baskil =

Village in Turkey

Beşbölük
- Village
- Location in Turkey
- Coordinates: 38.620°N 38.697°E
- Country: Turkey
- Province: Elazığ
- District: Baskil
- Population (2021): 45
- Time zone: UTC+3 (TRT)

Beşbölük (Kurdish: Dodikan) is a village in the Baskil District of Elazığ Province in Turkey. The village is populated by Kurds of the Zeyve tribe and had a population of 45 in 2021.

The hamlets of Çavuşlar, Gülüşağı and Söylü are attached to the village.

The eggplants grown in the village have an elliptical shape and are becoming more popular in the region. During the winter, heavy snowfalls often close the roads to the village, leading to the provincial authorities to initiate measures like setting up crisis desks to lead snow removal efforts.
