= Yeniocak, Baskil =

Village in Elazığ Province, Turkey

Yeniocak
- Village
- Location in Turkey
- Coordinates: 38.5310°N 38.7237°E
- Country: Turkey
- Province: Elazığ
- District: Baskil
- Population (2021): 86
- Time zone: UTC+3 (TRT)

Yeniocak (Kurdish: Gûlîkan) is a village in the Baskil District of Elazığ Province in Turkey. The village is populated by Kurds of the Herdî tribe and had a population of 86 in 2021.

The hamlet of Işıklı is attached to the village.
