= İmikuşağı, Baskil =

Village in Elazığ Province, Turkey

İmikuşağı
- Village
- Location in Turkey
- Coordinates: 38.516°N 38.455°E
- Country: Turkey
- Province: Elazığ
- District: Baskil
- Population (2021): 50
- Time zone: UTC+3 (TRT)

İmikuşağı (Kurdish: Îmîkan) is a village in the Baskil District of Elazığ Province in Turkey. The village is populated by Kurds of the Herdî tribe and had a population of 50 in 2021.

The hamlet of Çoğanlı is attached to the village.
