= Topaluşağı, Baskil =

Village in Elazığ Province, Turkey

Topaluşağı
- Village
- Location in Turkey
- Coordinates: 38.476°N 38.839°E
- Country: Turkey
- Province: Elazığ
- District: Baskil
- Population (2021): 161
- Time zone: UTC+3 (TRT)

Topaluşağı (Kurdish: Topalan) is a village in the Baskil District of Elazığ Province in Turkey. The village is populated by Kurds of the Parçikan tribe and had a population of 161 in 2021.

The hamlets of Adacık, Kemuşağı, Kömürhüngelisi, Omikan and Sapanlı are attached to the village.
