= Meydancık, Baskil =

Village in Elazığ Province, Turkey

Meydancık
- Village
- Location in Turkey
- Coordinates: 38.5381°N 38.8682°E
- Country: Turkey
- Province: Elazığ
- District: Baskil
- Population (2021): 39
- Time zone: UTC+3 (TRT)

Meydancık (Kurdish: Bezkan) is a village in the Baskil District of Elazığ Province in Turkey. The village is populated by Kurds of the Parçikan tribe and had a population of 39 in 2021.
