= Kızıluşağı, Baskil =

Village in Elazığ Province, Turkey

Kızıluşağı
- Village
- Location in Turkey
- Coordinates: 38.5695°N 38.6847°E
- Country: Turkey
- Province: Elazığ
- District: Baskil
- Population (2021): 162
- Time zone: UTC+3 (TRT)

Kızıluşağı (Kurdish: Kizilan) is a village in the Baskil District of Elazığ Province in Turkey. The village is populated by Kurds of the Zeyve tribe and had a population of 162 in 2021.

The hamlets of Dörtyol, Hacıdünükler, Hacıhali, Katarhan, Köseoğlu and Onbaşılar are attached to the village.
