= Şahindere, Baskil =

Village in Elazığ Province, Turkey

Şahindere
- Village
- Location in Turkey
- Coordinates: 38.6612°N 38.7331°E
- Country: Turkey
- Province: Elazığ
- District: Baskil
- Population (2021): 46
- Time zone: UTC+3 (TRT)

Şahindere (Kurdish: Bilikan) is a village in the Baskil District of Elazığ Province in Turkey. The village is populated by Kurds of the Zeyve tribe and had a population of 46 in 2021.

The hamlet of Abağa is are attached to the village.
