= Işıklar, Baskil =

Village in Elazığ Province, Turkey

Işıklar
- Village
- Location in Turkey
- Coordinates: 38.610°N 38.429°E
- Country: Turkey
- Province: Elazığ
- District: Baskil
- Population (2021): 158
- Time zone: UTC+3 (TRT)

Işıklar (Kurdsih: Kozan) is a village in the Baskil District of Elazığ Province in Turkey. The village had a population of 158 in 2021.

The hamlets of Hacıhasan, Işıklar and Tuzluca are attached to the village.
