= Yaylanlı, Baskil =

Village in Elazığ Province, Turkey

Yaylanlı
- Village
- Location in Turkey
- Coordinates: 38.404°N 38.872°E
- Country: Turkey
- Province: Elazığ
- District: Baskil
- Population (2021): 142
- Time zone: UTC+3 (TRT)

Yaylanlı (Kurdish: Koçikan) is a village in the Baskil District of Elazığ Province in Turkey. The village is populated by Kurds of the Herdî tribe and had a population of 142 in 2021.

The hamlets of Çamaltı, Kuran, Kurugöl and Mişmişler are attached to the village.
