= Resulkahya, Baskil =

Village in Elazığ Province, Turkey

Resulkahya
- Village
- Location in Turkey
- Coordinates: 38.610°N 38.630°E
- Country: Turkey
- Province: Elazığ
- District: Baskil
- Population (2021): 125
- Time zone: UTC+3 (TRT)

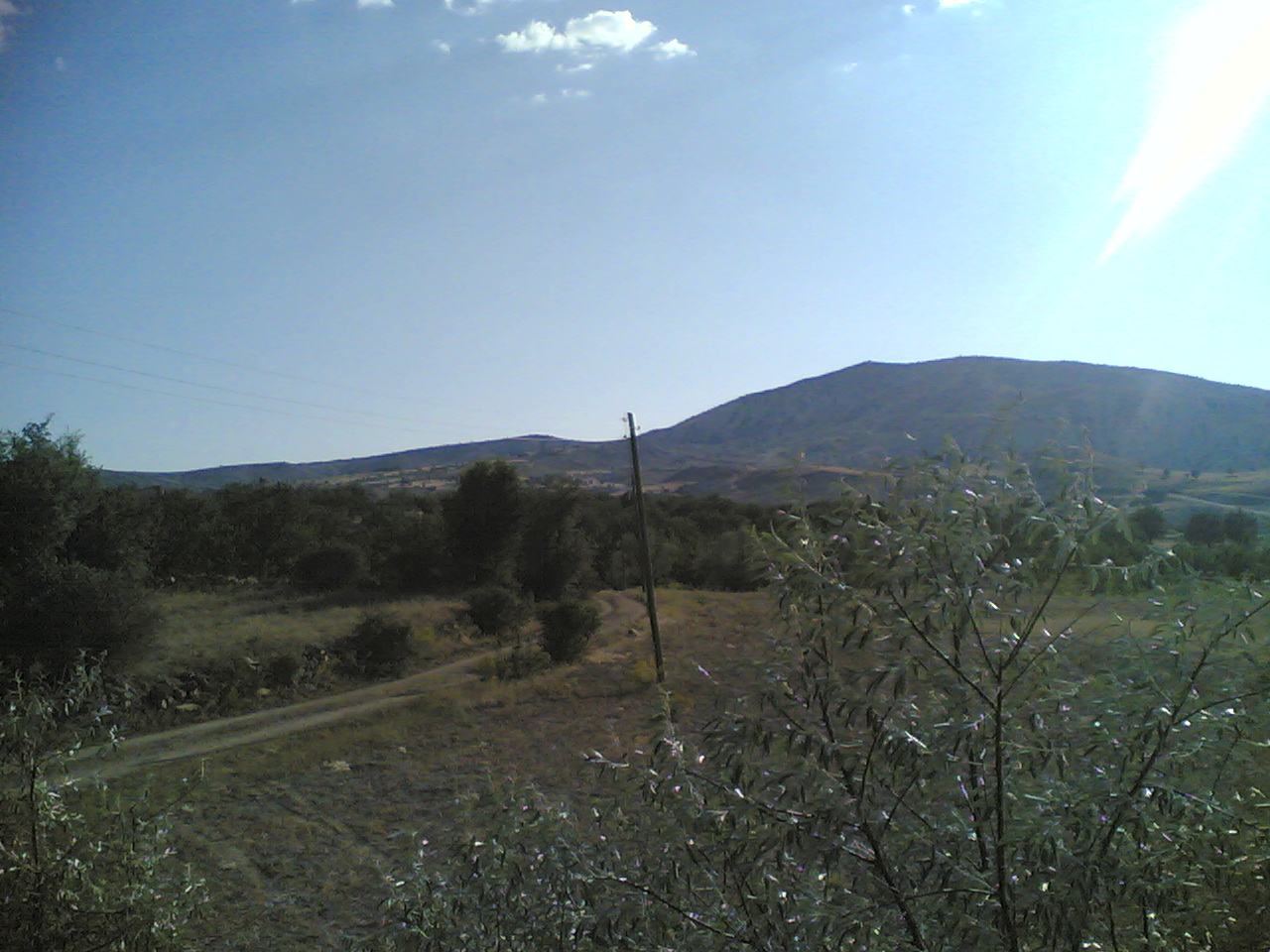

Resulkahya is a village in the Baskil District of Elazığ Province in Turkey. The village is populated by Kurds of the Zeyve tribe and had a population of 125 in 2021.

The hamlets of Beyleruşağı and Salimler are attached to the village.
