= Alangören, Baskil =

Village in Turkey

Alangören
- Village
- Location in Turkey
- Coordinates: 38.463°N 38.631°E
- Country: Turkey
- Province: Elazığ
- District: Baskil
- Population (2021): 232
- Time zone: UTC+3 (TRT)

Alangören (Kurdish: Lotan) is a village in the Baskil District of Elazığ Province in Turkey. The village is populated by Kurds of the Herdî tribe and had a population of 232 in 2021.

The hamlet of Gözüce is attached to the village.
