= Şituşağı, Baskil =

Village in Elazığ Province, Turkey

Şituşağı
- Village
- Location in Turkey
- Coordinates: 38.560°N 38.698°E
- Country: Turkey
- Province: Elazığ
- District: Baskil
- Population (2021): 150
- Time zone: UTC+3 (TRT)

Şituşağı (Kurdish: Şîtan) is a village in the Baskil District of Elazığ Province in Turkey. The village is populated by Kurds of the Herdî tribe and had a population of 150 in 2021.

The hamlets of Güneşli, Kuyucak, Tarlacık and Yuvalı are attached to the village.
