= Suyatağı, Baskil =

Village in Elazığ Province, Turkey

Suyatağı
- Village
- Location in Turkey
- Coordinates: 38.675°N 38.421°E
- Country: Turkey
- Province: Elazığ
- District: Baskil
- Population (2021): 156
- Time zone: UTC+3 (TRT)

Suyatağı (Kurdish: Sînanan) is a village in the Baskil District of Elazığ Province in Turkey. The village is populated by Kurds of the Herdî tribe and had a population of 156 in 2021.

The hamlets of Aksakal, Çevre and Çitli are attached to the village.
