= Akuşağı, Baskil =

Village in central Turkey

Akuşağı
- Village
- Location in Turkey
- Coordinates: 38.7079°N 38.5793°E
- Country: Turkey
- Province: Elazığ
- District: Baskil
- Population (2021): 164
- Time zone: UTC+3 (TRT)

Akuşağı (Kurdish: Axan) is a village in the Baskil District of Elazığ Province in Turkey. The village is populated by Kurds of the Zeyve tribe and had a population of 164 in 2021. It was reported as having around 70 households in the 2010s.

== History ==
The village is home to two different archaeological sites, no references to either of which have been identified in historical documents. The first, known as Akuşağı Höyük I, is located at the entrance of the village on the approach from Baskil. It consists of a mound of 10 m in height, with an area of 80x80 m. Several ceramics, dating back to the Chalcolithic period, Early Bronze Age and Hellenistic period were identified at this site. The second site is at the exit from the village leading towards Karakaya Dam and measures 120 m x 80 m in size. This site had been less well-preserved due to a nowadays dry stream on the southern part as well as the villagers having cleared some stones to allow agriculture. Ceramics from the Early Bronze Age and the Hellenistic period were identified there.

The name Akuşağı, of Turkish provenance, is attested in the Ottoman-era records of the village.

== Geography ==
The village is located near the Karaleylek and Saklıkapı canyons, the latter of which was discovered in 2019 when a villager was collecting mushrooms.

Parts of the village's territory fall within the Kırkgeçit Formation, and studies of the sediments around the village have revealed certain differences to other areas of the formation.

=== Hamlets ===
The hamlets of Aşağıgeçit, Cebrail, Dervişdere, Doruk, Gölgeli, Hacıtemur, İncikler, Konuklu, Öteşaluşağı, Tepecik, Yukarı Ciğdem and Yukarıgeçit are attached to the village.

Konuklu (also known as "Konuk") was initially settled by the Zeyve tribe as a separate village and was historically known as "Şeyhan". It merged later into the village of Akuşağı.

== Economy and infrastructure ==
Growing apricots has traditionally been a source of income for the villagers, but a drought in 2014 led to hundreds of apricot trees drying out. Walnut trees, an alternative source of income supported by the Turkish government, also dried out. The drought also threatened reliable access to drinking water, as the village fountain, normally the main supply, had dried up for the first time since the 1990s. With their livelihoods under threat, villagers, particularly young people, left their village en masse to seek work elsewhere. Some inhabitants attempted to sell their apricot orchards to no success, others sought alternative livelihoods by working in mines.

In response, the State Hydraulic Works started building a reservoir in the village, the foundations being laid by the Turkish Minister of Agriculture, Veysel Eroğlu in 2014. The reservoir was originally projected to cost ₺4 million, but ended up costing more than ₺11 million by the time it was completed in 2017. It became functional in 2018 and is expected to hold 2,66 million m^{3} of water, irrigating 1,490 decares.

Another agricultural activity is the production of tomato paste (Turkish: salça) from the locally produced, organic tomatoes, of which the seeds have been passed down the generations. The village women are traditionally tasked with producing this paste after the harvest at the end of the summer, and cans are sent to relatives of the villagers across Turkey. The village is also one of the more important centres for barley production and cattle husbandry in the district of Baskil.

The discovery of the canyons boosted local tourism, with enthusiasts across the country contacting villagers to arrange visits. The villagers have acted as tour guides for these tourists. The road towards the canyons becomes a narrow dirt track after the neighbourhood of Aşağıgeçit, and as this has on occasion proved impassable, villagers have used their tractors as a means of transport for the tourists.

The roads in and around Akuşağı were rebuilt in 2021 to make the village easier to access.

== Culture ==
The village is home to the two tombs of two sheikhs, Şeyh Yusuf Baba and Şeyh Sait. These are regarded by the locals as holy sites. Şeyh Sait's tomb is located at the neighbourhood of Dervişdere, on a rural road. His house is also preserved at the village, containing his sword and other artefacts belonging to him.
