= Hüyükköy, Baskil =

Village in Elazığ Province, Turkey

Hüyükköy
- Village
- Location in Turkey
- Coordinates: 38.684°N 38.481°E
- Country: Turkey
- Province: Elazığ
- District: Baskil
- Population (2021): 52
- Time zone: UTC+3 (TRT)

Hüyükköy is a village in the Baskil District of Elazığ Province in Turkey. The village is populated by Turks and had a population of 52 in 2021.
