= Hacıuşağı, Baskil =

Village in Elazığ Province, Turkey

Hacımehmetli
- Village
- Location in Turkey
- Coordinates: 38.532°N 38.742°E
- Country: Turkey
- Province: Elazığ
- District: Baskil
- Population (2021): 31
- Time zone: UTC+3 (TRT)

Hacımehmetli is a village in the Baskil District of Elazığ Province in Turkey. The village is populated by Kurds of the Herdî tribe and had a population of 31 in 2021.

The hamlets of Ataşkapı, Başağaç, Hülamiler, Samanlı and Yazılı are attached to the village.
