= Hacımustafaköy, Baskil =

Village in Elazığ Province, Turkey

Hacımustafaköy
- Village
- Location in Turkey
- Coordinates: 38.6369°N 38.8480°E
- Country: Turkey
- Province: Elazığ
- District: Baskil
- Population (2021): 55
- Time zone: UTC+3 (TRT)

Hacımustafaköy (Kurdish: Kurmemyan) is a village in the Baskil District of Elazığ Province in Turkey. The village is populated by Kurds of the Zeyve tribe and had a population of 55 in 2021.

The hamlets of Aktaş, Çamlı, Damlataş, Karakavak, Karakla, Yamaçlı and Yaşar are attached to the village.
