= Çiğdemlik, Baskil =

Village in Elazığ Province, Turkey

Çiğdemlik
- Village
- Location in Turkey
- Coordinates: 38.5017°N 38.4916°E
- Country: Turkey
- Province: Elazığ
- District: Baskil
- Population (2021): 102
- Time zone: UTC+3 (TRT)

Çiğdemlik (Kurdish: Hesika) is a village in the Baskil District of Elazığ Province in Turkey. The village is populated by Kurds of the Herdî tribe and had a population of 102 in 2021. The hamlets of Arapacık, Bahçeli and Karınca are attached to the village.
