= Pınarlı, Baskil =

Village in Elazığ Province, Turkey

Pınarlı
- Village
- Location in Turkey
- Coordinates: 38.440°N 38.740°E
- Country: Turkey
- Province: Elazığ
- District: Baskil
- Population (2021): 145
- Time zone: UTC+3 (TRT)

Pınarlı (Kurdish: Kanî) is a village in the Baskil District of Elazığ Province in Turkey. The village is populated by Kurds of the Izol tribe and had a population of 145 in 2021.

The hamlet of Gadebükü is attached to the village.
