= Bilaluşağı, Baskil =

Village in Turkey

Bilaluşağı
- Village
- Location in Turkey
- Coordinates: 38.570°N 38.398°E
- Country: Turkey
- Province: Elazığ
- District: Baskil
- Population (2021): 224
- Time zone: UTC+3 (TRT)

Bilaluşağı (Kurdish: Bîlan/Bîlalan) is a village in the Baskil District of Elazığ Province in Turkey. The village is populated by Kurds of the Herdî tribe and had a population of 224 in 2021. The hamlet of Yukarımahalle is attached to the village.

Bilaluşağı gets its name from a former head of the village called Bilal. Ancient graves, which are in poor condition and dating back to the times of the Seljuk Empire, can be found near the village.
