= Koçyolu, Baskil =

Village in Elazığ Province, Turkey

Koçyolu
- Village
- Location in Turkey
- Coordinates: 38.579°N 38.748°E
- Country: Turkey
- Province: Elazığ
- District: Baskil
- Population (2021): 97
- Time zone: UTC+3 (TRT)

Koçyolu (Kurdish: Atîkan) is a village in the Baskil District of Elazığ Province in Turkey. The village is populated by Kurds of the Herdî tribe and had a population of 97 in 2021.

The hamlets of Ambarı, Bekir, Beşik, Culfalar, Direkli, Haliçler, Harmanı and Yırıklar are attached to the village.
