= Karagedik, Baskil =

Village in Elazığ Province, Turkey

Karagedik
- Village
- Location in Turkey
- Coordinates: 38.5377°N 38.9274°E
- Country: Turkey
- Province: Elazığ
- District: Baskil
- Population (2021): 65
- Time zone: UTC+3 (TRT)

Karagedik (Kurdish: Haman) is a village in the Baskil District of Elazığ Province in Turkey. The village is populated by Kurds of the Parçikan tribe and had a population of 65 in 2021.

The hamlets of Karpuzlu and Kaşuşağı are attached to the village.
