= Emirhan, Baskil =

Village in Elazığ Province, Turkey

Emirhan
- Village
- Location in Turkey
- Coordinates: 38.621°N 38.543°E
- Country: Turkey
- Province: Elazığ
- District: Baskil
- Population (2021): 103
- Time zone: UTC+3 (TRT)

Emirhan is a village in the Baskil District of Elazığ Province in Turkey. The village is populated by Kurds of the Dirêjan tribe and had a population of 103 in 2021.

The hamlets of Akarsu, Fakir, Keçili and Sütlüce are attached to the village.
