= Karakaş, Baskil =

Village in Elazığ Province, Turkey

Karakaş
- Village
- Location in Turkey
- Coordinates: 38.579°N 38.649°E
- Country: Turkey
- Province: Elazığ
- District: Baskil
- Population (2021): 163
- Time zone: UTC+3 (TRT)

Karakaş is a village in the Baskil District of Elazığ Province in Turkey. The village is populated by Kurds of the Herdî tribe and had a population of 163 in 2021.

The hamlets of Ardıçlı, Atlılar, Güllüce, Gürlenk, İpşir, Karakaş, Karameşe and Taşlık are attached to the village.
