= İçlikaval, Baskil =

Village in Elazığ Province, Turkey

İçlikaval
- Village
- Location in Turkey
- Coordinates: 38.6322°N 38.7142°E
- Country: Turkey
- Province: Elazığ
- District: Baskil
- Population (2021): 65
- Time zone: UTC+3 (TRT)

İçlikaval (Kurdish: Simikan) is a village in the Baskil District of Elazığ Province in Turkey. The village is populated by Kurds of the Zeyve tribe and had a population of 65 in 2021.
