= Deliktaş, Baskil =

Village in Elazığ Province, Turkey

Deliktaş
- Village
- Location in Turkey
- Coordinates: 38.4736°N 38.6197°E
- Country: Turkey
- Province: Elazığ
- District: Baskil
- Population (2021): 232
- Time zone: UTC+3 (TRT)

Deliktaş (Kurdish: Sosikan) is a village in the Baskil District of Elazığ Province in Turkey. The village is populated by Kurds of the Herdî tribe and had a population of 232 in 2021. The hamlet of Yukarı Deliktaş is attached to the village.
