= Gemici, Baskil =

Village in Elazığ Province, Turkey

Gemici
- Village
- Location in Turkey
- Coordinates: 38.4794°N 38.5873°E
- Country: Turkey
- Province: Elazığ
- District: Baskil
- Population (2021): 352
- Time zone: UTC+3 (TRT)

Gemici (Kurdish: Kiftan) is a village in the Baskil District of Elazığ Province in Turkey. The village is populated by Kurds of the Herdî tribe and had a population of 352 in 2021.

The hamlet of Mollaköfte is attached to the village.

The village has a mosque that was built in 1939. The construction of a külliye around the mosque was started in 2016 and was finished in 2019. Gemici has a primary and a middle school.

On 12 April 2020, the village was placed into lockdown following villagers testing positive for COVID-19.
