= Karoğlu, Baskil =

Village in Elazığ Province, Turkey

Karoğlu
- Village
- Location in Turkey
- Coordinates: 38.6313°N 38.6380°E
- Country: Turkey
- Province: Elazığ
- District: Baskil
- Population (2021): 130
- Time zone: UTC+3 (TRT)

Karoğlu (Kurdish: Karkan) is a village in the Baskil District of Elazığ Province in Turkey. The village is populated by Kurds of the Zeyve tribe and had a population of 130 in 2021.

The hamlets of Atamlar, Çubuklu, Keçiuşağı and Zemzem are attached to the village.

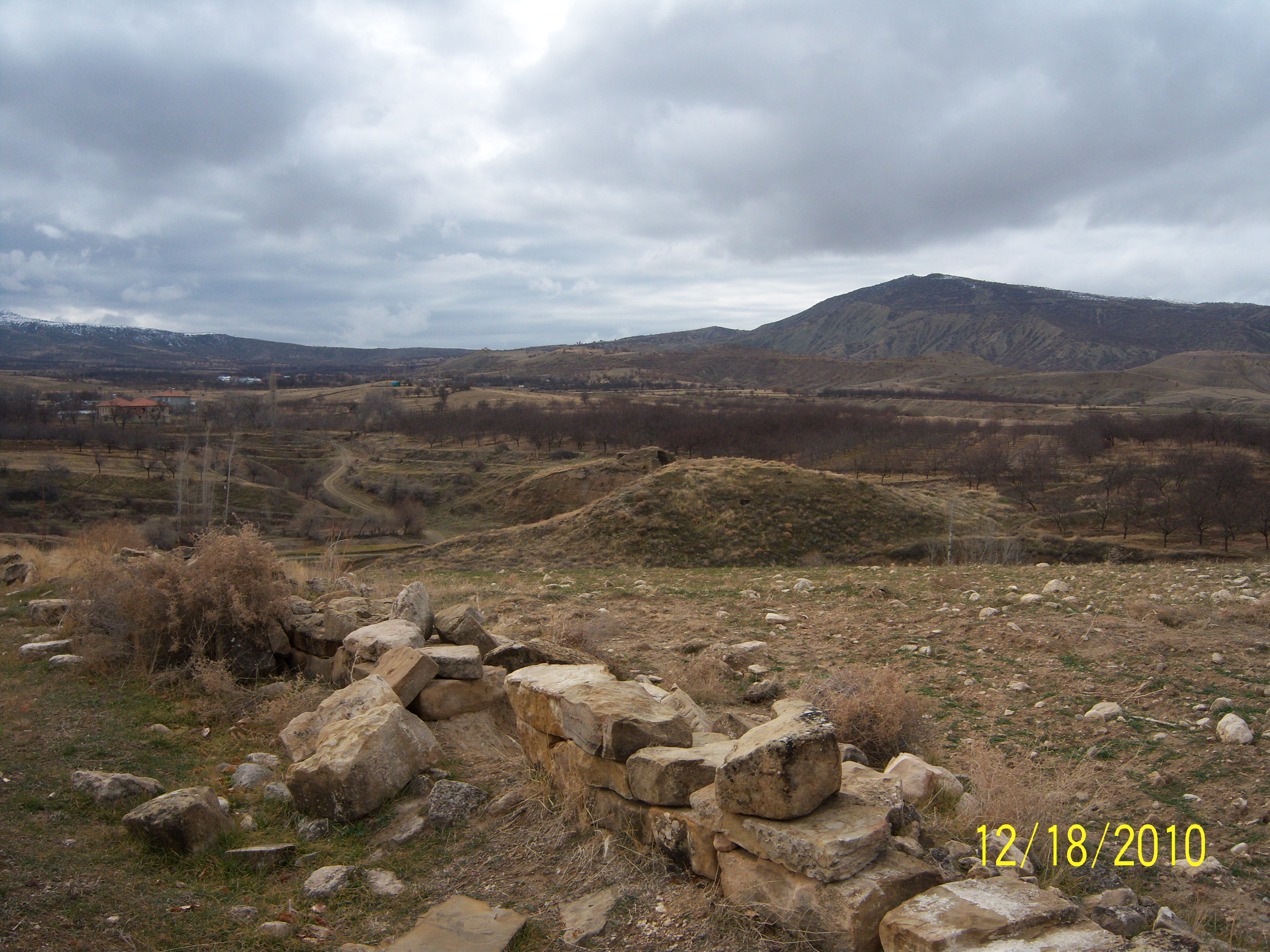
Karoğlu
