= Hacıhüseyinler, Baskil =

Village in Turkey

Hacıhüseyinler
- Village
- Location in Turkey
- Coordinates: 38°24′37″N 38°54′12″E
- Country: Turkey
- Province: Elazığ
- District: Baskil
- Population (2021): 100
- Time zone: UTC+3 (TRT)

Hacıhüseyinler is a village in the Baskil District of Elazığ Province in Turkey. The village is populated by Kurds of the Herdî tribe and had a population of 100 in 2021.

The hamlets of Erler, Hacımustafa, Yanıkbağ, Yapraklı and Yazarlı are attached to the village.
