= Kutlugün, Baskil =

Village in Elazığ Province, Turkey

Kutlugün
- Village
- Location in Turkey
- Coordinates: 38.4314°N 38.8896°E
- Country: Turkey
- Province: Elazığ
- District: Baskil
- Population (2021): 89
- Time zone: UTC+3 (TRT)

Kutlugün (Kurdish: Şêxelî) is a village in the Baskil District of Elazığ Province in Turkey. The village is populated by Kurds of the Parçikan tribe and had a population of 89 in 2021.

The hamlets of Dayılar and Küllükuşağı are attached to the village.
