= Aşağıkuluşağı, Baskil =

Village in Elazığ Province, Turkey

Aşağıkuluşağı
- Village
- Location in Turkey
- Coordinates: 38.644°N 38.543°E
- Country: Turkey
- Province: Elazığ
- District: Baskil
- Population (2021): 178
- Time zone: UTC+3 (TRT)

Aşağıkuluşağı (Kurdish:Qûliyana Jêr) is a village in the Baskil District of Elazığ Province in Turkey. The village is populated by Kurds of the Zeyve tribe and had a population of 178 in 2021.

The hamlets of Akyazı, Aydınlar, Barış, Beyler, Dikmeli, İskender, Kutuşağı, Memişler and Mollabekir are attached to the village.
