= Altınuşağı =

Village in Turkey

- Village
- Location in Turkey
- Coordinates: 38.555°N 38.472°E
- Country: Turkey
- Province: Elazığ
- District: Baskil
- Population (2021): 133
- Time zone: UTC+3 (TRT)

Altınuşağı is a village in the Baskil District of Elazığ Province in Turkey. The village is populated by Kurds of the Herdî tribe and had a population of 133 in 2021.

The hamlets of Dallıca and Doğanlı are attached to the village.

In August 2021, some land was reclaimed by the State Hydraulic Works from the water stream near the village to decrease the risk of flooding.
