= Kadıköy, Baskil =

Village in Elazığ Province, Turkey

Kadıköy
- Village
- Location in Turkey
- Coordinates: 38.438°N 38.696°E
- Country: Turkey
- Province: Elazığ
- District: Baskil
- Population (2021): 456
- Time zone: UTC+3 (TRT)

Kadıköy (Kurdish: Qadiyan) is a village in the Baskil District of Elazığ Province in Turkey. The village is populated by Kurds of the Izol tribe and had a population of 456 in 2021.

Kadıköy has a primary, middle and a high school.

Kadıköy has a beach on the Euphrates river that flows to the Karakaya Dam. In 2021, nearly 300.000 common carps were released to the river near the village by the Ministry of Agriculture and Forestry to increase the fish population.

== History ==
Kadıköy was historically known as Ebro and was the birthplace of the Syriac writer Abu'l-Faraç, aka Bar Hebraeus, in 1286.

The old site of Kadıköy is now submerged by the waters of the Karakaya Dam lake. In 1986, because of the dam's construction, the settlement was relocated to the eastern part of the alluvial fan of the Bekirhüseyin Çayı (Bekirhüseyin stream), which is a small tributary of the Euphrates.

On 18 December 2021, an earthquake happened near the village, 8.4 kilometers below the surface.

Local desert truffle species include Terfezia boudieri, Terfezia olbiensis, Picoa lefebvrei, and Picoa juniperi, which all grow underground on the roots of the host plant Helianthemum salicifolium in the village and its surroundings. Local residents gather the truffles during spring as a natural food source; most commonly they are fried with eggs.
