= Yukarıkuluşağı, Baskil =

Village in Elazığ Province, Turkey

Yukarıkuluşağı
- Village
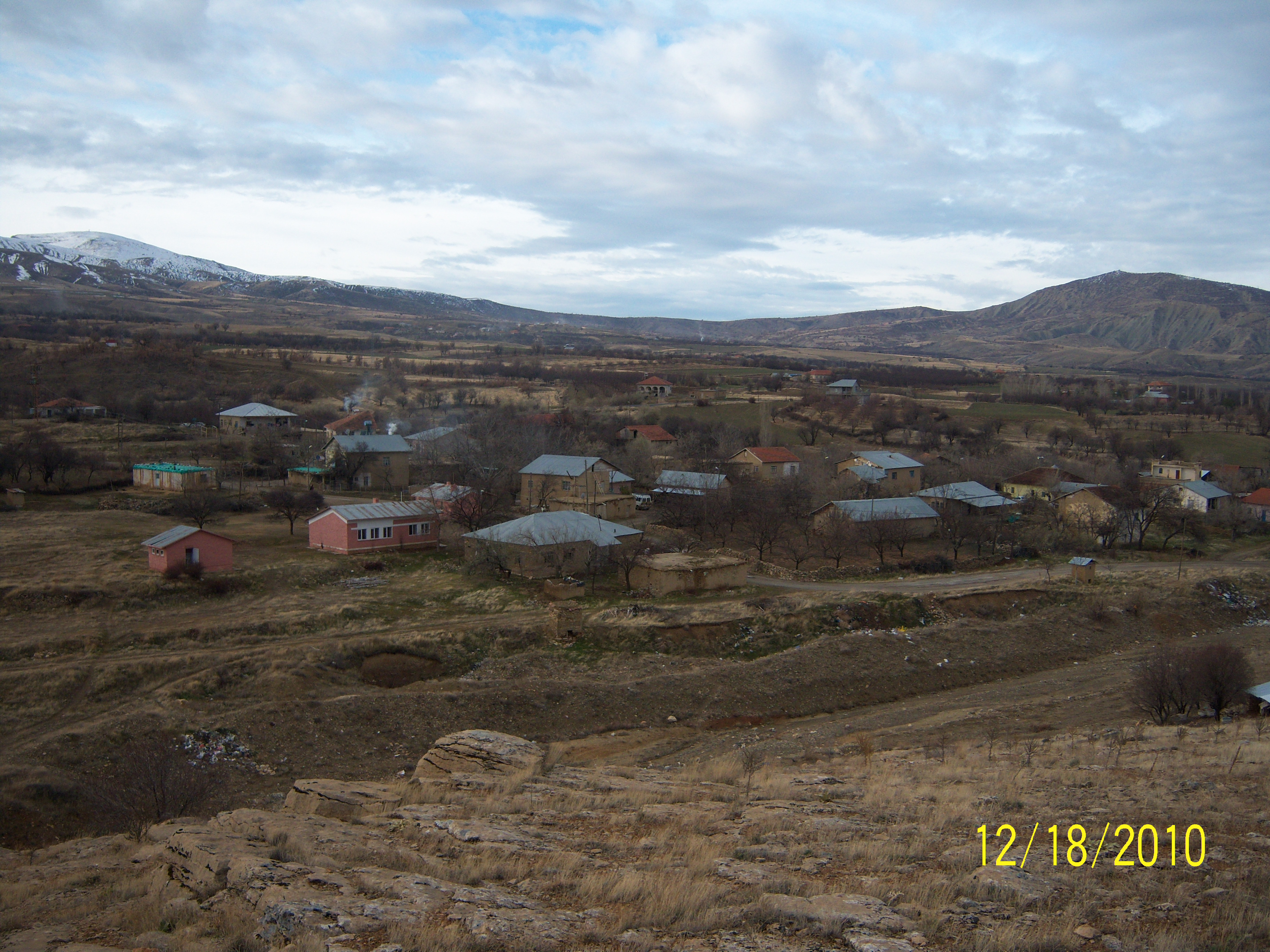

- Location within Turkey
- Coordinates: 38.627°N 38.655°E
- Country: Turkey
- Province: Elazığ
- District: Baskil
- Population (2021): 109
- Time zone: UTC+3 (TRT)

Yukarıkuluşağı (Kurdish: Qûliyana Jor) is a village in the Baskil District of Elazığ Province in Turkey. The village is populated by Kurds of the Zeyve tribe and had a population of 109 in 2021.

The hamlets of Kasım, Kuzucuk and Tabaklar are attached to the village.
