= Baskil District =

- District
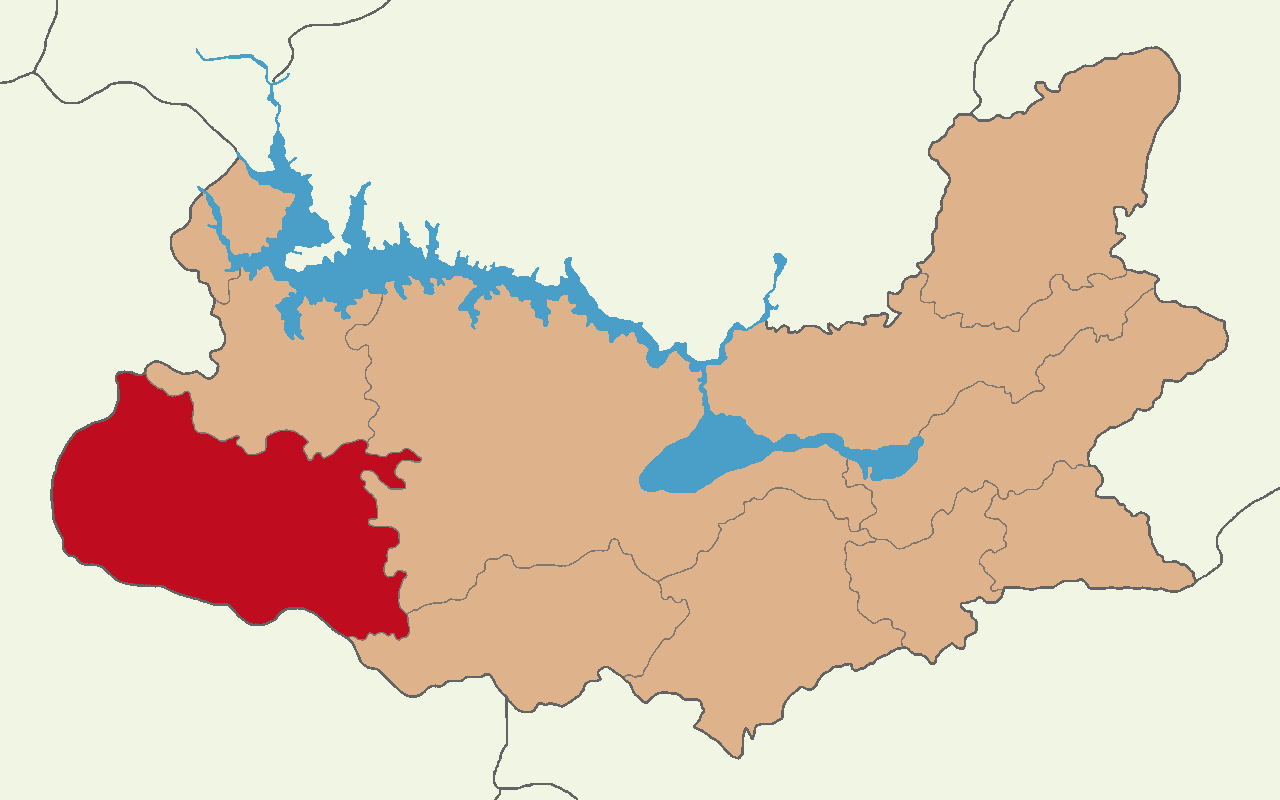
- Map showing Baskil District in Elazığ Province

- Location in Turkey
- Coordinates: 38°34′N 38°49′E
- Country: Turkey
- Province: Elazığ
- Seat: Baskil

Government
  - Kaymakam: Uhut Emre Koyuncu
- Area: 1,318 km^{2} (509 sq mi)
- Population (2021): 12,100
  - Density: 9.2/km^{2} (24/sq mi)
- Time zone: UTC+3 (TRT)

Baskil District is a district of Elazığ Province of Turkey. Its seat is the town Baskil. Its area is 1,318 km^{2}, and its population is 12,100 (2021). The district was established in 1926.

== Composition ==
There is 1 municipality in Baskil District:

- Baskil

There are 60 villages in Baskil District:

- Akdemir
- Akuşağı
- Aladikme
- Alangören
- Altınuşağı
- Aşağıkuluşağı
- Beşbölük
- Bilaluşağı
- Bozoğlak
- Çavuşlu
- Çiğdemlik
- Deliktaş
- Demirlibahçe
- Doğancık
- Düğüntepe
- Emirhan
- Eskiköy
- Gemici
- Habibuşağı
- Hacıhüseyinler
- Hacımehmetli
- Hacımustafaköy
- Hacıuşağı
- Harabekayış
- Hüyükköy
- Işıklar
- İçlikaval
- İmikuşağı
- Kadıköy
- Karaali
- Karagedik
- Karakaş
- Karoğlu
- Kayabeyli
- Kızıluşağı
- Koçyolu
- Konacık
- Konalga
- Kumlutarla
- Kuşsarayı
- Kutlugün
- Meydancık
- Paşakonağı
- Pınarlı
- Resulkahya
- Sarıtaş
- Söğütdere
- Suyatağı
- Şahaplı
- Şahindere
- Şeyh Hasan
- Şituşağı
- Tatlıpayam
- Tavşanuşağı
- Topaluşağı
- Yalındam
- Yaylanlı
- Yeniocak
- Yıldızlı
- Yukarıkuluşağı

== Demographics ==
Mother tongue, Baskil District, 1927 Turkish census
Turkish	Arabic	Kurdish	Circassian	Armenian	Unknown or other language
680	–	12,109	–	7	9

Religion, Baskil District, 1927 Turkish census
Muslim	Christian	Jewish	Unknown or other religion
12,791	14	–	–
