= Söğütdere, Baskil =

Village in Elazığ Province, Turkey

Söğütdere
- Village
- Location in Turkey
- Coordinates: 38.527°N 38.695°E
- Country: Turkey
- Province: Elazığ
- District: Baskil
- Population (2021): 105
- Time zone: UTC+3 (TRT)

Söğütdere (Kurdish: Simî Harde) is a village in the Baskil District of Elazığ Province in Turkey. The village is populated by Kurds of the Herdî tribe and had a population of 105 in 2021.

The hamlets of Kılıçlar, Ocaklı, Sokular and Şahlar are attached to the village.
