= Tavşanuşağı, Baskil =

Village in Elazığ Province, Turkey

Tavşanuşağı
- Village
- Location in Turkey
- Coordinates: 38.6078°N 38.8172°E
- Country: Turkey
- Province: Elazığ
- District: Baskil
- Population (2021): 32
- Time zone: UTC+3 (TRT)

Tavşanuşağı (Kurdish: Doşanan) is a village in the Baskil District of Elazığ Province in Turkey. The village is populated by Kurds of the Zeyve tribe and had a population of 32 in 2021.

The hamlet of Köklü is are attached to the village.
