= Kuşsarayı, Baskil =

Village in Elazığ Province, Turkey

Kuşsarayı
- Village
- Location in Turkey
- Coordinates: 38.457°N 38.686°E
- Country: Turkey
- Province: Elazığ
- District: Baskil
- Population (2021): 154
- Time zone: UTC+3 (TRT)

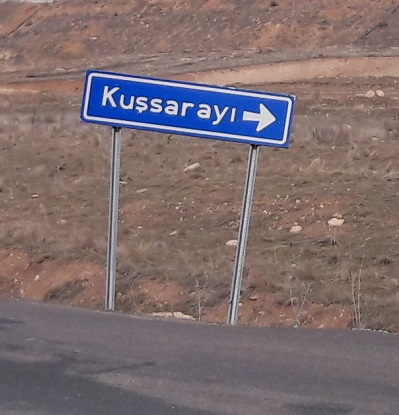
A view from Kuşsarayı

Kuşsarayı (Kurdish: Bekirhûsên) is a village in the Baskil District of Elazığ Province in Turkey. The village is populated by Kurds of the Herdî tribe and had a population of 154 in 2021.

The hamlet of Aşağı is attached to the village.
