= Yıldızlı, Baskil =

Village in Elazığ Province, Turkey

Yıldızlı
- Village
- Location in Turkey
- Coordinates: 38.5615°N 38.7386°E
- Country: Turkey
- Province: Elazığ
- District: Baskil
- Population (2021): 54
- Time zone: UTC+3 (TRT)

Yıldızlı (Kurdish: Battalan) is a village in the Baskil District of Elazığ Province in Turkey. The village is populated by Kurds of the Herdî tribe and had a population of 54 in 2021.

The hamlets of Battaluşağı and Davutu are attached to the village.
