= Kumlutarla, Baskil =

Village in Elazığ Province, Turkey

Kumlutarla
- Village
- Location in Turkey
- Coordinates: 38.717°N 38.500°E
- Country: Turkey
- Province: Elazığ
- District: Baskil
- Population (2021): 49
- Time zone: UTC+3 (TRT)

Kumlutarla (also known as Adaf) is a village in the Baskil District of Elazığ Province in Turkey. The village is populated by Turkmens who adhere to Alevism and had a population of 49 in 2021.

The hamlet of Kuyucak is attached to the village.
