= Şeyh Hasan, Baskil =

Village in Elazığ Province, Turkey

Şeyh Hasan
- Village
- Location in Turkey
- Coordinates: 38.536°N 38.429°E
- Country: Turkey
- Province: Elazığ
- District: Baskil
- Population (2021): 85
- Time zone: UTC+3 (TRT)

Şeyh Hasan (formerly Tabandüzü) is a village in the Baskil District of Elazığ Province in Turkey. The village is populated by Turkmens who adhere to Alevism and had a population of 85 in 2021.

The hamlets of Akkonak and Pınar are attached to the village.
