= Ali Akdemir =

Turkish academic (born 1963)

- Born: June 3, 1963; Sivas, Turkey
- Occupations: University Professor, Management

Ali Akdemir (born June 3, 1963, in Sivas) is a Turkish University Professor for Management and former Rector of the Çanakkale Onsekiz Mart University (Gallipoli). He is the former Dean of the Biga Faculty Of Economics and Administrative Sciences (BIIBF) at Çanakkale Onsekiz Mart University (Gallipoli). His main research area is on management and leadership issues, has some several articles and presentations.

Prof. Akdemir was Chairman of the World Universities Congress in Canakkale and is editor of the Journal of Administrative Sciences.
