= Bozoğlak, Baskil =

Village in Turkey

Bozoğlak
- Village
- Location in Turkey
- Coordinates: 38.6177°N 38.4909°E
- Country: Turkey
- Province: Elazığ
- District: Baskil
- Population (2021): 80
- Time zone: UTC+3 (TRT)

Bozoğlak, also known as Berete, (Kurdish: Dihî mezin) is a village in the Baskil District of Elazığ Province in Turkey. The village had a population of 80 in 2021. The hamlet of Dolma is attached to the village.

Founded by the Bucak of Muşar, the village is mostly populated by Kurds.
