= Kayabeyli, Baskil =

Village in Elazığ Province, Turkey

Kayabeyli
- Village
- Location in Turkey
- Coordinates: 38.588°N 38.876°E
- Country: Turkey
- Province: Elazığ
- District: Baskil
- Population (2021): 84
- Time zone: UTC+3 (TRT)

Kayabeyli (Kurdish: Reşwanan) is a village in the Baskil District of Elazığ Province in Turkey. The village is populated by Kurds of the Herdî tribe and had a population of 84 in 2021.
