= Doğancık, Baskil =

Village in Turkey

Doğancık
- Village
- Location in Turkey
- Coordinates: 38.5971°N 38.8268°E
- Country: Turkey
- Province: Elazığ
- District: Baskil
- Population (2021): 127
- Time zone: UTC+3 (TRT)

Doğancık (Kurdish: Milyan) is a village in the Baskil District of Elazığ Province in Turkey. The village is populated by Kurds of the Zeyve tribe and had a population of 127 in 2021.

The hamlets of Akkuş, Bekçili, Kemerli, Subaşı and Yukarımahalle are attached to the village.

In 2019, the building of a külliye in the village in honour of a local policeman killed in action was started, but shortly after it was abandoned as the construction company wasn't paid. In June 2021, the construction was re-started by the Municipality of Elazığ. The building was finished in October 2021.
