= Hacımehmetli, Alanya =

Hacımehmetli
- Neighbourhood
- Location in Turkey
- Coordinates: 36.5675°N 31.9681°E
- Country: Turkey
- Province: Antalya
- District: Alanya
- Population (2022): 2,144
- Time zone: UTC+3 (TRT)

Hacımehmetli is a neighbourhood in the municipality and district of Alanya, Antalya Province, Turkey. Its population is 2,144 (2022).
