= Akdemir, Baskil =

Village in Turkey

Akdemir
- Village
- Location in Turkey
- Coordinates: 38.581°N 38.712°E
- Country: Turkey
- Province: Elazığ
- District: Baskil
- Population (2021): 53
- Time zone: UTC+3 (TRT)

Akdemir (Kurdish: Şêxan) is a village in the Baskil District of Elazığ Province in Turkey. The village is populated by Kurds of the Zeyve tribe and had a population of 53 in 2021.

The hamlets of Alban and İnanç are attached to the village.
