= Hacımehmetli, Baskil =

Village in Elazığ Province, Turkey

Hacımehmetli
- Village
- Location in Turkey
- Coordinates: 38.501°N 38.532°E
- Country: Turkey
- Province: Elazığ
- District: Baskil
- Population (2021): 108
- Time zone: UTC+3 (TRT)

Hacımehmetli (Kurdish: Hacimeman) is a village in the Baskil District of Elazığ Province in Turkey. The village is populated by Kurds of the Herdî tribe and had a population of 108 in 2021.

The hamlet of Beyazevler is attached to the village.
