= Konacık, Baskil =

Village in Elazığ Province, Turkey

Konacık
- Village
- Location in Turkey
- Coordinates: 38.502°N 38.558°E
- Country: Turkey
- Province: Elazığ
- District: Baskil
- Population (2021): 244
- Time zone: UTC+3 (TRT)

Konacık (Kurdish: Otetalan) is a village in the Baskil District of Elazığ Province in Turkey. The village is populated by Kurds of the Herdî tribe and had a population of 244 in 2021.

The hamlets of Akcalar, Gökbel, Haydarkolu and Hüseyindavut are attached to the village.
