= Paşakonağı, Baskil =

Village in Elazığ Province, Turkey

Paşakonağı
- Village
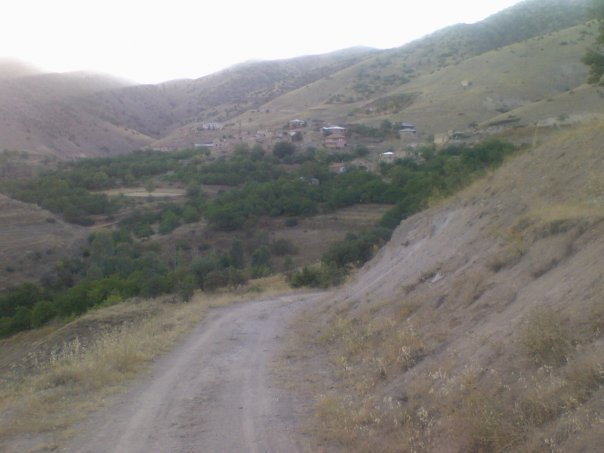

- Location within Turkey
- Coordinates: 38.491°N 38.711°E
- Country: Turkey
- Province: Elazığ
- District: Baskil
- Population (2021): 59
- Time zone: UTC+3 (TRT)

Paşakonağı (Kurdish: Kurdikan) is a village in the Baskil District of Elazığ Province in Turkey. The village is populated by Kurds of the Herdî tribe and had a population of 59 in 2021.

The hamlet of Bekirmıstık is attached to the village.
