= Konalga, Baskil =

Village in Elazığ Province, Turkey

Konalga
- Village
- Location in Turkey
- Coordinates: 38.565°N 38.517°E
- Country: Turkey
- Province: Elazığ
- District: Baskil
- Population (2021): 127
- Time zone: UTC+3 (TRT)

Konalga (Kurdish: Zeykan) is a village in the Baskil District of Elazığ Province in Turkey. The village is populated by Kurds of the Herdî tribe and had a population of 127 in 2021.

The hamlets of Direkli, Güllübal, Hacıyusuf, Korucu, Ovacık, Özbaşı, Pekmezli, Sal, Uğurlu, Ulucak, Üçkonak, Üzümlü and Yağmurlu are attached to the village.
