= Istanbul-Uzunköprü Regional =

Regional rail in Turkey

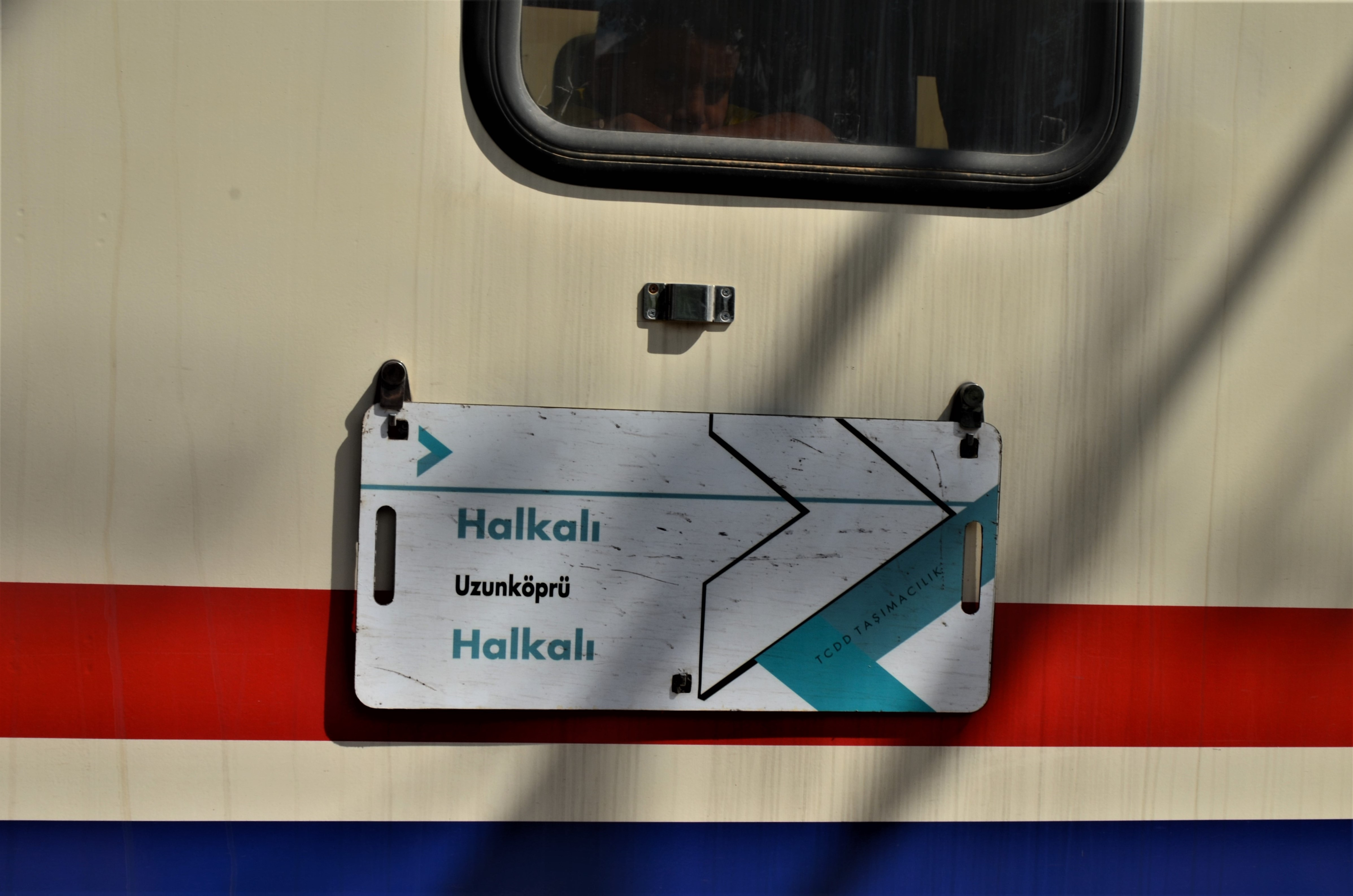

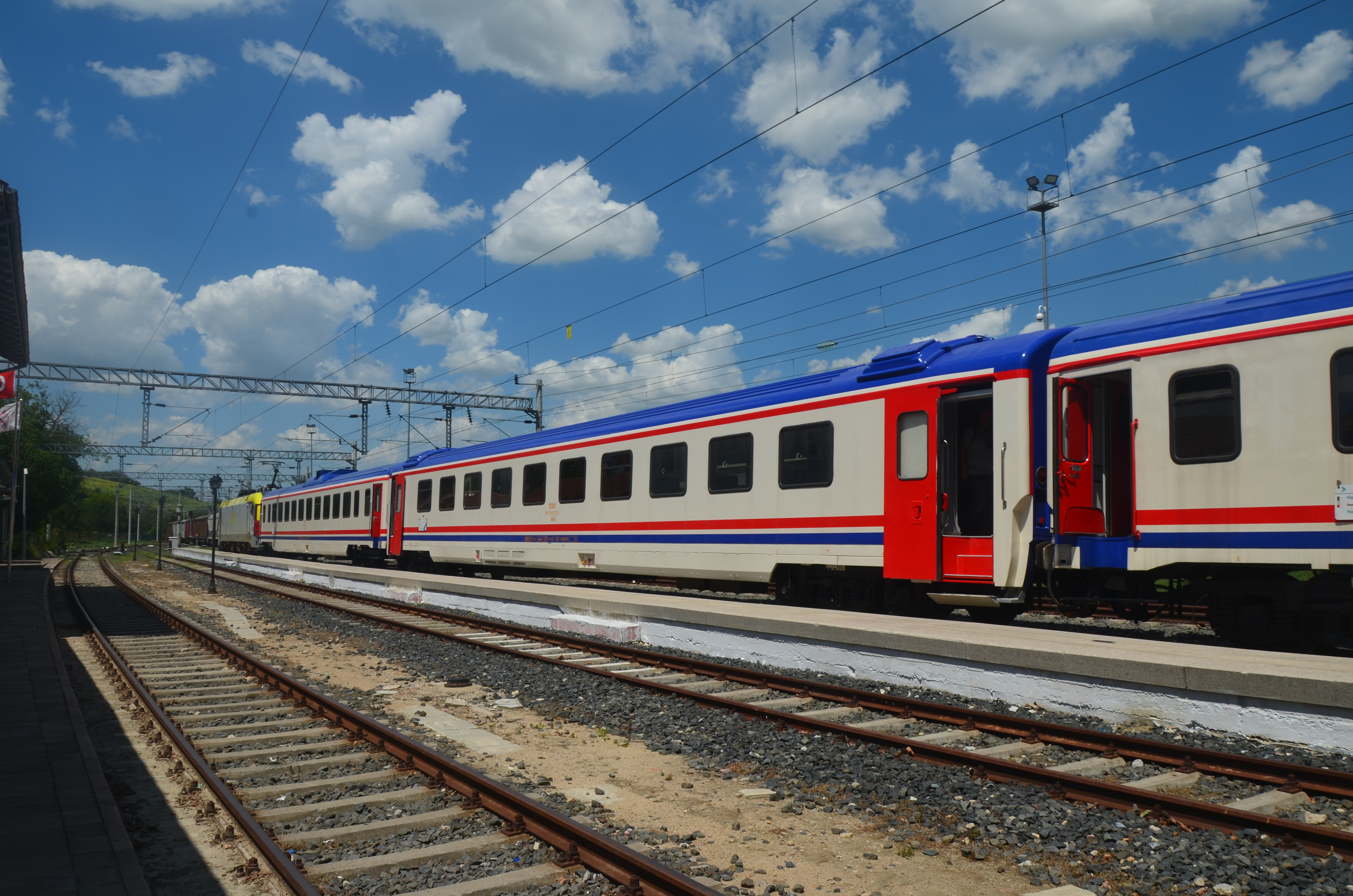

Overview
- Service type: Regional rail
- Status: Operating
- Locale: Thrace, Turkey
- First service: May 1, 2018; 8 years ago
- Current operator: TCDD Taşımacılık
- Former operator: TCDD

Route
- Termini: Uzunköprü, Edirne Province; Halkalı, Istanbul Province
- Stops: 12
- Distance travelled: 243.7 km (151.4 mi)
- Average journey time: 3 hours,30 minutes
- Service frequency: 1 roundtrip daily

On-board services
- Seating arrangements: Coach seating

Technical
- Track gauge: 1,435 mm (4 ft 8 1/2 in)
- Track owner: Turkish State Railways

The Uzunköprü-Halkalı Regional (Turkish: Uzunköprü-Halkalı Bölgesel Treni) is a regional rail service operated by the Turkish State Railways. The trains run between Uzunköprü in Edirne Province and Halkalı in Istanbul Province, at Thrace, northwestern Turkey.

The train operates daily on one roundtrip. The train number 12704 departs from Halkalı at 8:30, and the train number 12703 leaves Uzunköprü at 15.40 local time. It serves twelve towns between Uzunköprü and Halkalı, among them Alpullu, Lüleburgaz, Çorlu, Çerkezköy and Çatalca. The total average travel time on the 243.7 km (151.4 mi)-long line is three and half hours in one direction.

The regional train operates on the historic railway line, which was constructed by French during the Ottoman Empire in the late 1800s, and was used by the Ottoman company Chemins de fer Orientaux between Istanbul and Didymoteicho, then Ottoman territory, serving Halkalı, Uzunköprü and Eskiköy. In 2012, the railway line was closed to traffic due to renovation works. On May 1, 2018, the Uzunköprü-Halkalı Regional train service resumed after six years.

== Derailment ==
On 8 July 2018, the train number 12703 bound Halkalı derailed shortly before Çorlu due to damaged railway structure as a result of heavy rainfall. Five of the six railway cars overturned after derailment. 24 passengers were killed and 318 injured at the accident. The train service was suspended for three days during the recovery operations. The train service resumed on 11 July 2018.
