= Kartal Karagedik =

Turkish opera singer

- Born: İzmir, Turkey
- Occupation: Operatic baritone
- Organizations: Hamburg State Opera
- Website: www.kartalkaragedik.com

Kartal Karagedik is a Turkish operatic baritone and a photographer. Based in Germany, he has been a member of the Hamburg State Opera from 2015.

== Life and career ==
Karagedik was born in İzmir. He studied voice in his hometown, in Istanbul, with Güzin Gürel among others, and at the Accademia dell’Opera Italiana in Bologna.

He was a member of the Theater Erfurt and the Theater Magdeburg. In 2015 he joined the ensemble of the Hamburg State Opera. His roles there have included Mozart's Gugliemo in Così fan tutte and the Count in Le nozze di Figaro, Enrico in Donizetti's Lucia di Lammermoor, Verdi's Germont in La traviata and Ford in Falstaff, Tchaikovsky's Jeletzky in Pique Dame and the title role in Eugene Onegin, Puccini's Marcello in La bohème, Lescaut in Manon Lescaut and Sharpless in Madama Butterfly. In 2026 he portrayed Verdi's Macbeth in a new production opening the season, staged by intendant Tobias Kratzer.

Karagedik appeared as a guest at the Opera Vlaanderen, the Grand Théâtre de Genève, Opéra de Monte-Carlo, and the Teatro Comunale di Bologna, among others. He portrayed Zurga in Bizet's Les pêcheurs de perles in the opening performance of the 2025 Internationale Maifestspiele Wiesbaden at the Staatstheater Wiesbaden, conducted by Chin-Chao Lin.

In concert, he performed Mahler's Symphony No. 8, Kindertotenlieder and Lieder eines fahrenden Gesellen, and Mendelssohn's Die erste Walpurgisnacht. He sang in concerts at the Schleswig-Holstein Musik Festival and venues including the Elbphilharmonie in Hamburg, the Brucknerhaus in Linz, the Mozartsaal in Vienna, the Herkulessaal in Munich, and the Metropolitan Hall in Tokyo. He collaborated with conductors such as Ottavio Dantone, Pablo Heras-Casado, Eliahu Inbal, and Joana Mallwitz.

In his first album, Karagedik recorded 21 Lieder by Franz Schubert that are inspired by Greek mythology, entitled Prometheus and released in 2025. He was accompanied by Helmut Deutsch as in a recital of the 2024 Schubertiade in Hohenems.

Karagedik is also a photographer, exhibiting from 2014, and earning awards for his photography.
