= Parçikan (tribe) =

Kurdish tribe of Turkey

Parçikan (Kurdish: Parçikan) is a Kurdish tribe residing mainly in Elazığ Province in Turkey. The tribe numbers around 20,000 members and are predominantly Sunni Muslims. The tribe is transhumant nomadic.

== History ==
The tribe lived around Azerbaijan and Iran before migrating westward after the Mongol invasion and settled around Baskil which during the period of the governance of Aq Qoyunlu, Safavid Iran and the Ottoman Empire went under the name of Hersini.

In the 17th century, Hersini was densely populated by Kurdish tribes, including Parçikan but also the Zeyve and Herdi tribes. Due to the heavy tax obligations in the Sanjak of Harput, some members of the tribe dispersed to surrounding areas. In addition, some tribe members were forcefully settled in various places in Anatolia.

According to tribe leader Dursun Demez, the Ottomans handed over the Sarıçiçek Plateau in Kemaliye district to his tribe in 1245 by an edict, allowing the tribe to use the land for nomadic pastoralism. In 2019, the tribe pushed for state recognition to make the plateau Parçikan land.

In 1921, the tribe expressed its support for the Koçgiri rebellion after Nuri Dersimi approached the tribe for support. As the rebellion grew, Parçikan Kurds ultimately joined in. Tribal leaders also supported the 2010 Turkish constitutional referendum put forward by AKP.

== Geography ==
The Parçikan tribe lives in the following towns and villages:

=== In Elazığ Province ===
- Akçakale, center district
- Aladikme village, Baskil
- Alatarla village, center district
- Altınkürek village, Keban
- Bulutlu village, center district
- Çalıca village, center district
- Çavuşlu village, Baskil
- Demirlibahçe village, Baskil
- Düğüntepe village, Baskil
- Eskiköy village, Baskil
- Gözpınar village, center district
- Günbağı village, Keban
- Habibuşağı village, Baskil
- Harabekayış village, Baskil
- Işıkyolu village, center district
- Karaali village, Baskil
- Karaali village, center district
- Karagedik village, Baskil
- Koçharmanı village, center district
- Koparuşağı village, center district
- Kurşunkaya village, Keban
- Kutlugün village, Baskil
- Meydancık village, Baskil
- Ortaçalı village, center district
- Sakabaşı village, center district
- Şahaplı village, Baskil
- Sarıtaş village, Baskil
- Taşkesen village, Keban
- Tatlıpayam village, Baskil
- Topaluşağı village, Baskil
- Yalındamlar village, center district
- Yolçatı village, center district

=== Other settlements ===
- Parçikan village (formerly named Bozburun), Arguvan, Malatya Province

== Bibliography ==
- Ayna, Bayram (2018), "Millî Mücadele Yıllarında Koçgiri Aşireti Reisi Alişan Bey'in Faaliyetleri", Akademik Tarih ve Düşünce Dergisi (in Turkish), 5 (5/18): 210–231
- Çakar, Enver (2012). Elazığ Baskil Yöresi Aşiretleri. Ertem Basım. ISBN 9786058677609.
- Çakar, Enver (2013), Osmanlı Döneminde Harput'ta Kırsal Yerleşme: Baskil Örneği (PDF) (in Turkish), Firat University
- Çakar, Enver (2019), 19. yüzyılın ilk yarısında keban köylerinin idari ve demografik yapısı
- Güneş, Ergin (2014), Boztuğ, Onursal (ed.), Koçgiri İsyanı Ekseninde Dersim Direniş (in Turkish), Tunceli University, pp. 232–261
- Kaya, Ali (1999), Başlangıcından günümüze Dersim tarihi (in Turkish)
- Uzun, Celalettin (2016). "17. yüzyılda Harput" (in Turkish).
