= Peyk =

Peyk may refer to:

- Peyk, Azerbaijan
- Peyk, Iran (disambiguation)
  - Peyk, East Azerbaijan
  - Peyk, Markazi
