= Guy Dash =

Guy Dash گوي داش
- Village
- Location within Iran
- Coordinates: 36°57′39″N 46°51′04″E
- Country: Iran
- Province: East Azerbaijan
- County: Charuymaq
- Bakhsh: Central
- Rural District: Charuymaq-e Jonubegharbi

Population (2006)
  - Total: 213
- Time zone: UTC+3:30 (IRST)
  - Summer (DST): UTC+4:30 (IRDT)

Guy Dash (Persian: گوي داش, also Romanized as Gūy Dāsh; also known as Garī Dāsh) is a village in Charuymaq-e Jonubegharbi Rural District, in the Central District of Charuymaq County, East Azerbaijan Province, Iran. At the 2006 census, its population was 213, in 34 families.
