= Alachiq =

Alachiq الاچيق
- Village
- Location within Iran
- Coordinates: 37°05′41″N 46°41′59″E
- Country: Iran
- Province: East Azerbaijan
- County: Charuymaq
- Bakhsh: Central
- Rural District: Quri Chay-ye Sharqi

Population (2006)
  - Total: 152
- Time zone: UTC+3:30 (IRST)
  - Summer (DST): UTC+4:30 (IRDT)

Alachiq (Persian: الاچيق, also Romanized as Ālāchīq; also known as Ālājīq) is a village in Quri Chay-ye Sharqi Rural District, in the Central District of Charuymaq County, East Azerbaijan Province, Iran. At the 2006 census, its population was 152, in 36 families.
