= Bolqan =

Bolqan بلقان
- Village
- Location within Iran
- Coordinates: 37°16′21″N 46°58′02″E
- Country: Iran
- Province: East Azerbaijan
- County: Charuymaq
- Bakhsh: Central
- Rural District: Varqeh

Population (2006)
  - Total: 97
- Time zone: UTC+3:30 (IRST)
  - Summer (DST): UTC+4:30 (IRDT)

Bolqan (Persian: بلقان, also Romanized as Bolqān; also known as Bolgān) is a village in Varqeh Rural District, in the Central District of Charuymaq County, East Azerbaijan Province, Iran. At the 2006 census, its population was 97, in 21 families.

== Name ==
According to Vladimir Minorsky, the name "Bolqan" is derived from the Mongolian female given name Bulghan (or Bulaghan), which means "sable marten" and was borne by several historical Mongol princesses.
