= Allah Kandi =

Allah Kandi الله كندي
- Village
- Location within Iran
- Coordinates: 37°04′47″N 47°03′27″E
- Country: Iran
- Province: East Azerbaijan
- County: Charuymaq
- Bakhsh: Central
- Rural District: Charuymaq-e Markazi

Population (2006)
  - Total: 33
- Time zone: UTC+3:30 (IRST)
  - Summer (DST): UTC+4:30 (IRDT)

Allah Kandi (Persian: الله كندي, also Romanized as Allāh Kandī) is a village in Charuymaq-e Markazi Rural District, in the Central District of Charuymaq County, East Azerbaijan Province, Iran. At the 2006 census, its population was 33, in 6 families.
