= History of Dalsland =

The history of Dalsland covers the parts of Sweden that are today considered part of the province of Dalsland, as well as areas that have historically been regarded as belonging to it. The human history of Dalsland began after the end of the latest ice age. The province lay in the borderlands between Sweden and Norway and long remained on the periphery of both countries, with poor roads that made travel difficult. Dalsland's first – and only – city was Åmål, founded in 1643. Ironworks and sawmills were established in the province in the 17th century; previously, its economy had been almost entirely dependent on agriculture. Dalsland experienced its economic heyday in the 19th century, largely because of oat cultivation, but following years of hardship in the 1860s and increased competition on the oat market, the economy declined. Between 1861 and 1930, 50,000 people from Dalsland emigrated to the United States or Norway.

The paper industry became important during the 19th and 20th centuries, but Dalsland remained predominantly agricultural for a long time. In 1950, the proportion of the population dependent on agriculture for its livelihood was almost twice as high as in Sweden as a whole. During the second half of the 20th century, however, the population became increasingly concentrated in urban areas, although these remained small in scale. In 2024, Dalsland had a population of 48,000, compared with 85,000 in 1880.

== Prehistory and name ==
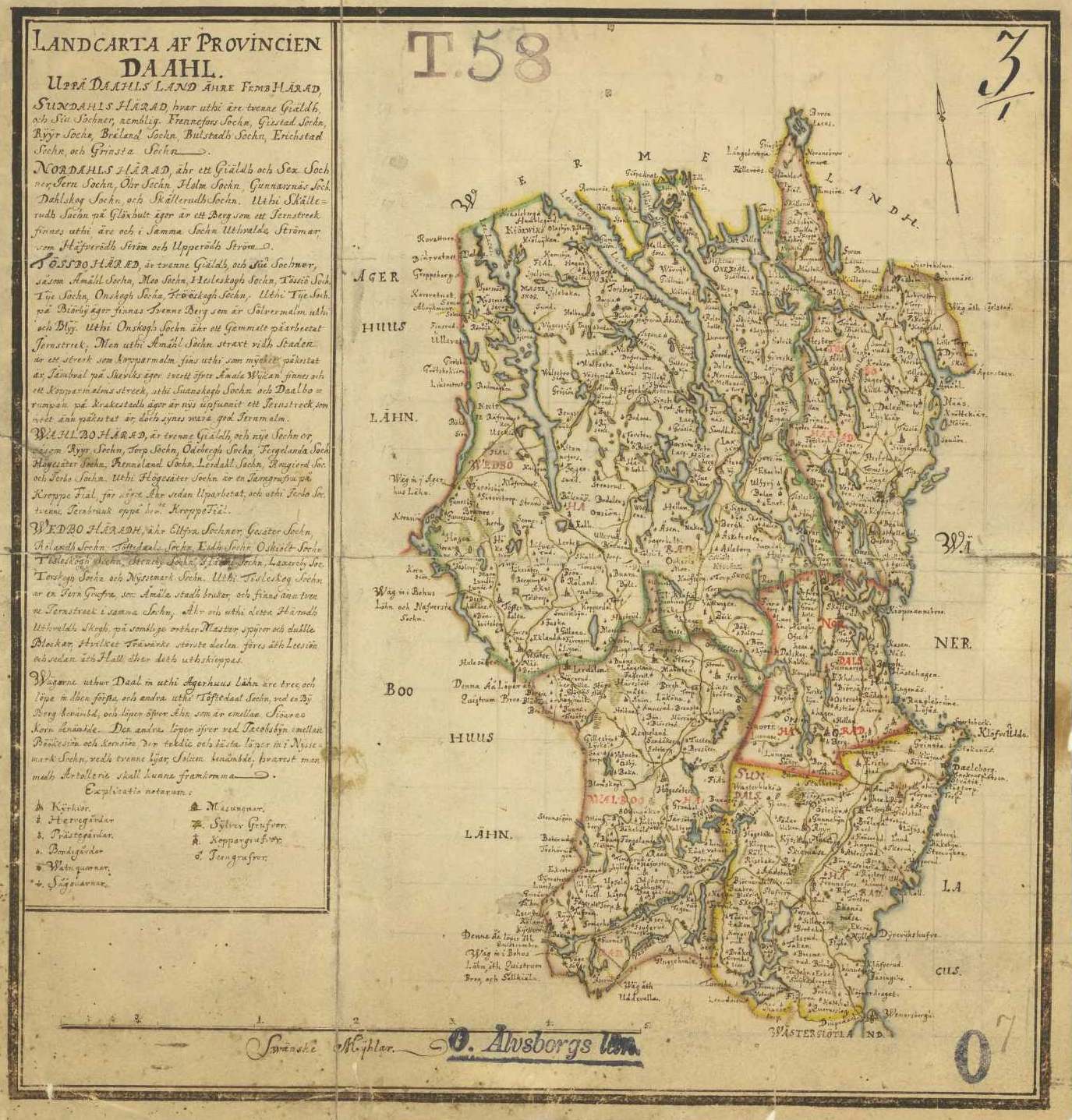

The first parts of what is now Sweden became free of ice after the latest ice age around 14,000 BCE. The ice began retreating from Dalsland about 2,000 years later, and it took another 2,000 years before the entire province was ice-free. During this period, the retreat halted for about 800 years because of a colder climate, leaving the edge of the ice sheet across the middle of what would later become Dalsland. Agriculture and animal husbandry reached Dalsland between 3,000 BCE and 2,000 BCE.

Dal was the name used for the valleys and plains of Nordal and Sundal hundreds. Vedbo, Valbo, Tössbo and Nordmark – the last of which is now regarded as part of Värmland – were known as Markir, "the Marches", and their names derive from this designation. The area was probably sparsely populated, with small agricultural settlements scattered among uninhabited forests. The terrain isolated the different hundreds from one another.

== Middle Ages ==
=== Formation of Norway and Sweden ===
During the early formation of what would become Sweden, Dalsland lay on the periphery. Its inhabitants did not participate in royal elections and did not provide forces for the leidang in wartime. Dalsland was a border zone between the powers developing into Norway and Sweden and lay on the fringes of both spheres of influence.

The Norwegian king Magnus Barefoot invaded Dal and the Marches in the 1090s in an attempt to bring them under Norwegian rule. He fought the Swedish king Inge the Elder and was defeated. As part of the peace agreement following the meeting at Kungahälla – probably in 1100 or 1101 – Magnus married Inge's daughter Margaret Fredkulla. During the 12th century, the Marches remained an area over which no king exercised any effective authority, although they were theoretically part of the Swedish realm. During the 12th and 13th centuries, Dal and the Marches repeatedly served as bases for Norwegian rebels, who withdrew there to regroup during conflicts over the Norwegian crown.

=== Sweden and the Kalmar Union ===
By the late 13th and early 14th centuries, Swedish control over Dal and the Marches had become firmly established. Dalsland formed part of the law district of Västergötland. Dalaborg was founded in 1304 and became a political and military centre of the region into the 15th century. When Magnus Eriksson became king of both Sweden and Norway, Dalsland temporarily became less peripheral, since it now lay near the centre of King Magnus's sphere of power. After Albert of Mecklenburg took power in Sweden, Magnus Eriksson and later his son Haakon Magnusson retained control over western Sweden, including Dalsland, and much of the policy pursued by Albert in the parts of Sweden he controlled therefore never affected Dalsland. In ecclesiastical administration, medieval Dalsland constituted a deanery within the Diocese of Skara, with around fifty churches.

The plough was introduced into what is now Dalsland sometime between the 11th and 13th centuries. The watermill was also new to the area during this period. Agricultural land expanded during the 12th, 13th and early 14th centuries. Medieval Dalsland consisted mainly of isolated farms. These later developed into villages as farms were divided between brothers, who had to expand existing farms and bring new land under cultivation to support themselves. By the 18th century, many clustered villages contained between five and eight farms, but lone farms remained common.

Like the rest of the Nordic countries, Dalsland was affected by the Black Death, the ensuing agricultural crisis and further plague epidemics during the 14th and 15th centuries. Agricultural expansion ceased and farms were abandoned; the population did not begin to recover until the 16th century. Very few new houses were built in Dalsland during the 150 years following the Black Death, since the population decline had left the province with more buildings than it needed.

=== Early Vasa period ===
Coat of arms.

The Kalmar Union broke down following the death of Christopher of Bavaria in 1448. During the turbulent decades that followed, Swedish nobles primarily fought the Danish union authorities over Kalmar County, although western Sweden and Dal were also contested between Swedish regents, the union government and Norwegian interests. Following Gustav Vasa's accession to power, authority was increasingly concentrated in the king. Gustav Vasa was suspicious, at times paranoid, and his reluctance to trust others led him to concentrate power within his own family. Dal became a county, initially under the king's son Magnus. The county of Dalsland received its coat of arms in 1560, originally depicting an ox rather than the modern bull.

At the beginning of the 16th century, almost everyone in Dalsland was dependent on agriculture. Barley accounted for 80% of the grain harvest, rye for 15% and oats for 5%. At the time, Dalsland accounted for only half a percent of the kingdom's grain production. The province contained 1% of Sweden's livestock and 1.5% of its population. In 1570, Dalsland had 7,000 inhabitants. Gustav Vasa attempted to encourage more people to move to Dal in order to stimulate the provincial economy, but there is no known evidence that this resulted in any significant migration. Farmers continued to pay their taxes in kind rather than in money, unlike in some other parts of Sweden. The province long remained among the least prioritized by the central government.

== 17th and 18th centuries ==
=== Dalsland's first city ===
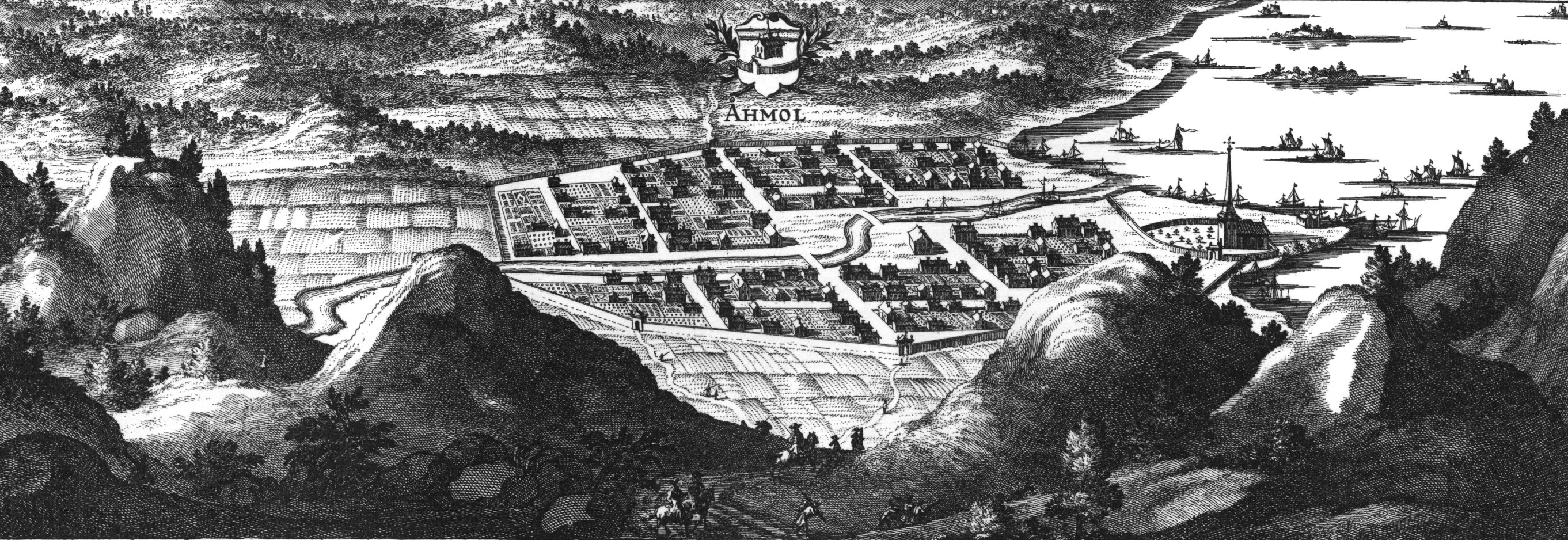
Åmål around 1700, from Suecia Antiqua et Hodierna.

Southern Dalsland was severely affected by the Northern Seven Years' War, during which farms were looted and burned. Nevertheless, the farmers fared comparatively well, as livestock could be hidden in the forests and their simple homes could easily be rebuilt. Farms in southern Dalsland were again burned during the Kalmar War, and farmers were forced to pay contributions to the occupying forces. The war interrupted plans by the Swedish Crown to establish the region's first city at the mouth of the Dalbergsån river.

Instead, Dalsland's first settlement with city rights was established at Åmål, partly in order to curb cross-border trade with Norway. Earlier attempts had been made to persuade the inhabitants of Dalsland to trade at Brätte, the predecessor of Vänersborg, but without success. In 1640, people were encouraged to settle in Åmål, which was already a marketplace and had a harbour, with the promise that it would receive city privileges once it had grown sufficiently. These were granted in 1643. Almost all of the burghers kept livestock. The first generations of Åmål residents were farmers and fishers living in a town, although craftsmen were also present; even they generally had to practise agriculture in order to support themselves.

Åmål initially differed from other villages primarily in its city privileges, and beyond its immediate surroundings it played a smaller role than the more distant cities of Gothenburg, Vänersborg, Karlstad and Lidköping. The newly founded city was captured and plundered during the Hannibal War, and parts of it burned down. During the Gyldenløve War three decades later, Norwegian troops plundered western Dalsland, and 409 farms – at least a quarter of all farms in the province – were burned, as were parts of Åmål.

Dalsland fared better during the Great Northern War. Troops were quartered there in 1700 and 1709, and Charles XII invaded Norway from Dalsland and Bohuslän, but the province escaped major destruction.

=== Ironworks ===
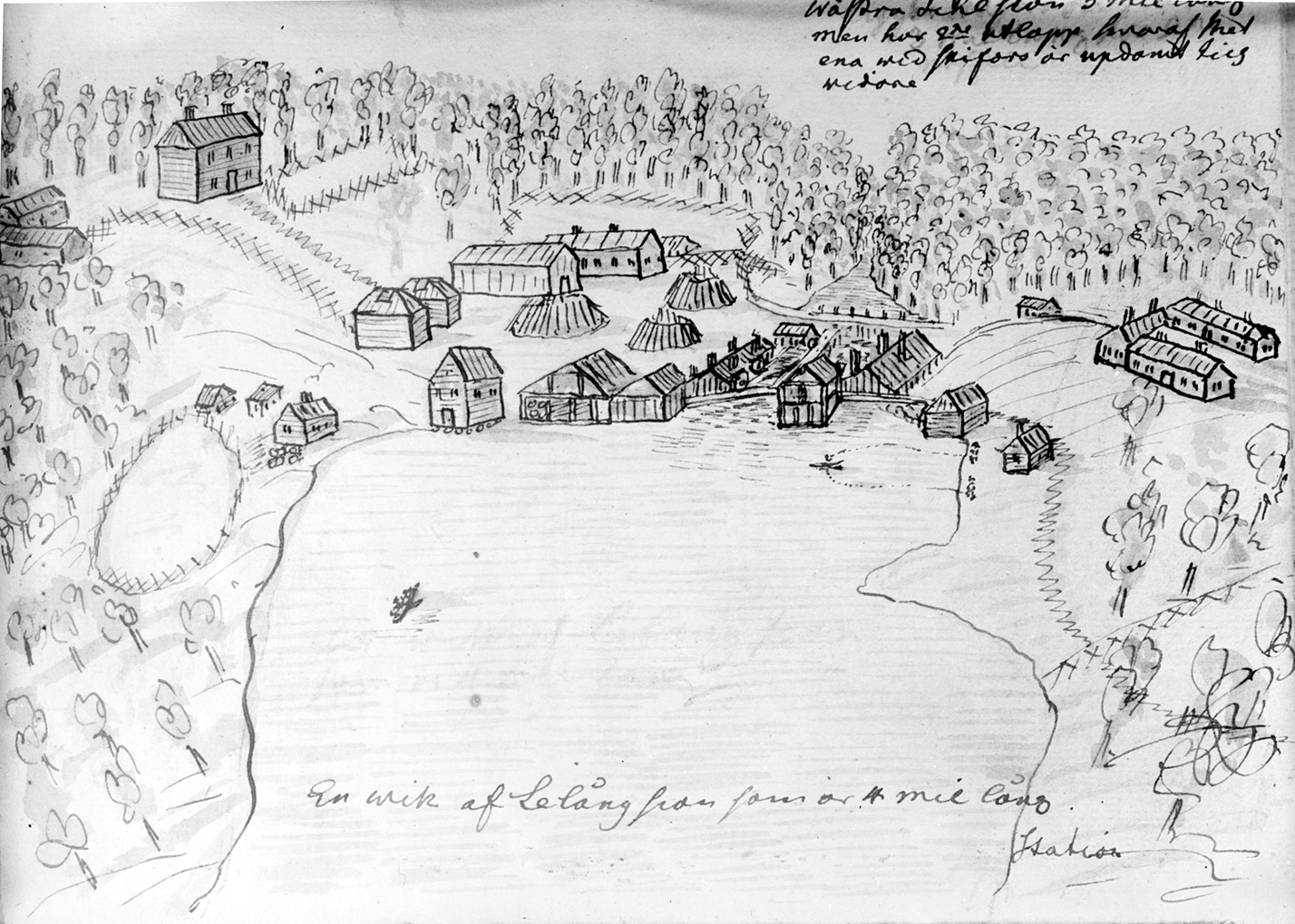
Gustafsfors ironworks in the 1750s.

Several unsuccessful attempts were made to establish mining operations in Dalsland in the mid-17th century. Instead, during the second half of the century, the province developed ironworks that refined existing pig iron brought from Bergslagen, taking advantage of Dalsland's forests and abundant supply of wood. The ironworks expanded during the 1690s, although development was impeded by conflicts with the burghers of Åmål, who sought to force iron producers to weigh their goods on the city's scales for a fee and to transport iron across Vänern using the burghers' vessels rather than their own. Dalsland's sawmills also became economically important during the 17th century.

Expansion halted after the 1690s, although the existing ironworks continued to operate. The Crown feared that the forests would be depleted and wished to avoid depressing prices on the export market, and therefore regulated production. When the state restricted the production of bar iron, further processing became increasingly important, and production shifted towards goods such as nails, sheet metal, steel and iron wire. In 1719, Uddevalla was granted the right to export iron goods, helping to stimulate the establishment of new ironworks in Dalsland from the 1730s onward. The first was Öxnäs in 1733, followed by another sixteen during the 18th and 19th centuries. The largest were Öxnäs, Billingsfors, Gustafsfors and Rådanefors; the others were smaller. Timber production also increased during the 18th century, and around fifty new sawmills were established. Further attempts to establish mining in Dalsland nevertheless failed.

=== Buildings ===
In 1583, 34 of Dalsland's 43 churches were considered more or less dilapidated. Because of Gustav Vasa's confiscations, the churches faced serious financial difficulties, and in most cases substantial new investment did not become possible until the middle of the 17th century. From 1650, parish assemblies were allowed to decide for themselves on repairs and rebuilding, financed by taxes paid by the local population, and began accumulating funds for this purpose. Resources were spent on pulpits, altars, permanent furnishings, and wall and ceiling paintings. Between 1650 and 1760, twenty new churches were built in Dalsland, often with three-sided chancels, a feature popular in the province.

On 18th-century farms in Dalsland, agricultural buildings – the threshing barn, grain barn, fodder barn, cowshed and stable – were often combined in a single building, sometimes together with the dwelling house.

== 19th century ==
=== Population growth ===
Sweden experienced substantial population growth during the 19th century. In 1810, Dalsland had 39,300 inhabitants; by 1860, the population had risen to more than 80,920. Sweden's overall population increased by 62% during the period, whereas Dalsland's grew by 106%, with every hundred in the province considerably exceeding the national average. Åmål's population increased by 93%, broadly in line with growth in Swedish cities generally. By 1880, Dalsland's population had reached approximately 85,000. The area under cultivation quadrupled, as previously uncultivated land was converted into farmland. Agricultural societies played an important role in encouraging this development.

Arable land increased from 5% to 20% of the province's area, and in Sundal Hundred from 7% to 50%. Meadows were converted first, followed by outlying land such as heathland, wooded hills and wetlands, which were drained. Lakes were sometimes lowered or drained, and attempts were also made to cultivate former bogs. Between 1816 and 1840, net migration into Sundal Hundred exceeded 1,000 people, most of them arriving from Västergötland. Agricultural reforms, above all the land consolidation reform of 1827, caused traditional village communities to disappear and individual farm owners to assume greater control. Village communities had never been particularly strongly developed in Dalsland, which made the transition easier.

=== The heyday of oats ===
Oats had been of little importance in the 16th century, but cultivation expanded during the 17th and 18th centuries and came to dominate agriculture in the 19th century. In 1865, oats accounted for 74% of Dalsland's grain production; in 1880 and 1890, the figure was 80%. Oats were well suited to newly cultivated land, were easy to transport, could be distilled into brännvin when there was a surplus, and were in international demand, creating an export market. Good oat harvests brought prosperity, and Dalsland cottages and large manor houses were built. The plains became highly dependent on oats, while livestock farming remained important in the forested districts.

=== The arrival of industry ===
Technological developments in the United Kingdom reduced the competitiveness of Swedish ironworks. The new technology reached Dalsland in the 1820s, first at Bäckefors, and production shifted from iron towards steel. Upperud and Vitlanda soon followed, and by the mid-1840s the new technology had spread to all of Dalsland's ironworks. Together with the introduction of freedom of trade, this brought about a golden age for the province's ironworks, but many closed during the 1860s and 1870s. By 1872, only three remained – Billingsfors, Honefors-Forsbacka and Lisefors – although these were much more efficient and produced more than the earlier small ironworks.

Large sawmills made their breakthrough in Sweden during the 1850s and experienced a boom in the 1870s. Sawmills became an important part of Dalsland's industrial economy despite competition from Norway. Their success peaked during the 1890s. Slate quarrying also became important in Dalsland because of the Dal Formation. Large-scale extraction of clay slate had begun in the late 18th century, and during the 19th century both Gunnarsnäs and Dalskog became important centres of the slate industry. The industry depended on cheap labour, however, and encountered difficulties during the 1880s because of rising wages in Dalsland and competition from British producers using machinery to quarry slate. The straw industry and straw handicrafts also emerged as new elements of Dalsland's economy during the 19th century.

=== The canal and the paper industry ===
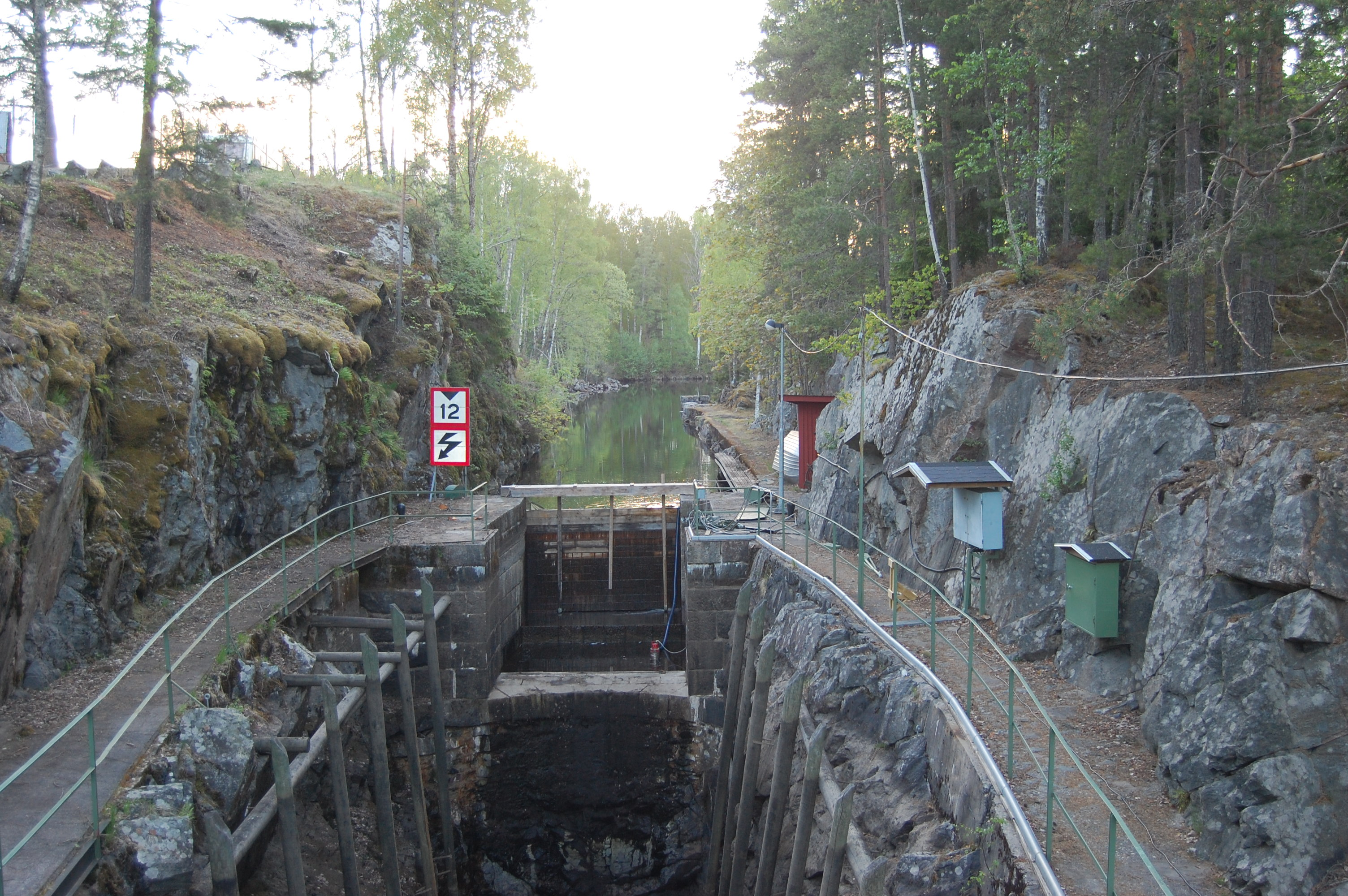
The Dalsland Canal, at the lower lock in Töcksfors.

Dalsland's roads were very poor – it wasn't possible to travel any longer distance by carriage or with a cart until the 18th century – and between 1864 and 1868 the Dalsland Canal was constructed to provide better water transport. Only twelve kilometres of canal had to be excavated, as the remainder consisted of pre-existing waterways, mainly lakes. Because of the differences in elevation, however, 31 locks and the Håverud Aqueduct had to be built. The canal made possible the development of a paper industry, and paper mills were established towards the end of the 19th century. In 1900, Dalsland accounted for 5% of Sweden's pulp production and 10% of its paper production. The railway also came to Dalsland in the 1870s, but the industry in northern Dalsland was concentrated around the Dalsland Canal and connected lakes.

Around the turn of the century, Rudolf Liljeqvist established a profitable chemical factory producing potash lye, chlorinated lime and caustic soda, but transport costs eventually became too high and the factory closed in 1925.

=== Years of hardship and emigration ===
The years 1866–1868 were difficult for farmers because of poor harvests, and mortality rose sharply in 1869, particularly in the agricultural areas of the Dalbo Plain. Oat cultivation depleted the soil, but no measures were taken to address the problem. During the 1880s, northwestern Europe as a whole entered an agricultural crisis. Small ironworking communities had also lost their industries as centralisation resulted in fewer but larger works, before these in turn were outcompeted by newer industries during the 1880s. Agriculture put more focus on animal husbandry and less on crops, but this development came later in Dalsland than in most of Sweden.

The decline of both the ironworks and agriculture worsened living conditions, and Dalsland became a region of large-scale out-migration. Previously, limited numbers of people had migrated across the Norwegian border; now many emigrated to the United States. The first emigrant from Dalsland arrived in the United States in 1851, but emigration did not reach a substantial scale until the 1880s. In 1887 alone, a number equivalent to 3% of Dalsland's population moved abroad, most of them to the United States. During the late 1880s and early 1890s, a larger proportion of the population emigrated from Dalsland than from any other Swedish province.

Transatlantic emigration declined when the United States experienced an economic downturn in 1894, but subsequently recovered and continued into the 20th century until the outbreak of World War I in 1914. Between 1861 and 1930, 50,000 people from Dalsland emigrated abroad – 33,400 to the United States and 15,000 to Norway.

== 20th century ==
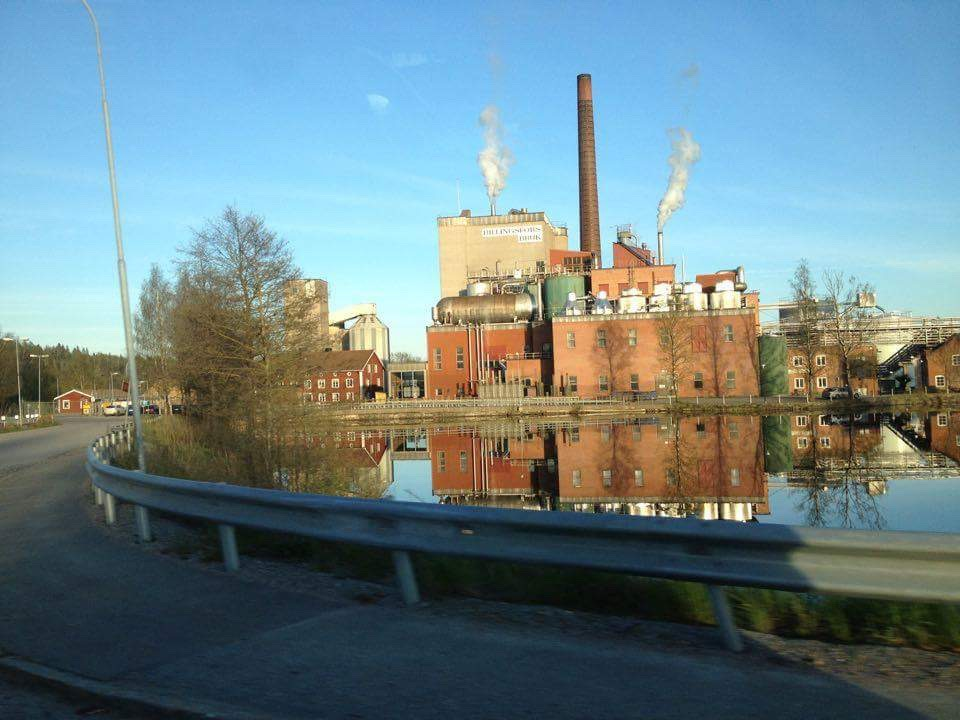
The former ironworks and present-day pulp mill at Billingsfors.

Dalsland remained predominantly agricultural for a long time. In 1950, 66% of Sweden's population lived in towns and urban areas, compared with 40% in Dalsland. In Sweden as a whole, 24% of the population depended on agriculture for its livelihood, compared with 42% in Dalsland. When people from Dalsland moved to urban areas, they often moved outside the province. Dalsland therefore experienced population decline during much of the 20th century. Its population was 63,000 in 1950 and 60,000 in 1960. By 1970 it had fallen to 54,000, before increasing to 57,000 in 1980 and declining again to 48,000 by 2024.

Following the collapse of the oat economy, livestock farming became more important. Milk production expanded and dairies were established, the largest of them at Brålanda, which processed 7,000 tonnes of milk annually. During the second half of the 20th century, many small farms disappeared because they could no longer compete economically. Dalsland's industries experienced a difficult 20th century, as did those in many other parts of Sweden, although the paper industry remained successful for a long time before parts of it were eliminated during the later 20th and early 21st centuries. Like the rest of Sweden, Dalsland's population became increasingly concentrated in urban areas, although these remained small in scale. No large cities or major industries developed.
