= Pir Saqqa =

Pir Saqqa پيرسقا
- Village
- Location within Iran
- Coordinates: 36°52′15″N 46°57′12″E
- Country: Iran
- Province: East Azerbaijan
- County: Charuymaq
- Bakhsh: Central
- Rural District: Charuymaq-e Jonubegharbi

Population (2006)
  - Total: 171
- Time zone: UTC+3:30 (IRST)
  - Summer (DST): UTC+4:30 (IRDT)

Pir Saqqa (Persian: پيرسقا, also Romanized as Pīr Saqqā) is a village in Charuymaq-e Jonubegharbi Rural District, in the Central District of Charuymaq County, East Azerbaijan Province, Iran. At the 2006 census, its population was 171, in 30 families.
