= Gerd Alu =

Gerd Alu گردالو
- Village
- Location within Iran
- Coordinates: 37°08′29″N 46°59′32″E
- Country: Iran
- Province: East Azerbaijan
- County: Charuymaq
- Bakhsh: Central
- Rural District: Charuymaq-e Markazi

Population (2006)
  - Total: 215
- Time zone: UTC+3:30 (IRST)
  - Summer (DST): UTC+4:30 (IRDT)

Gerd Alu (Persian: گردالو, also Romanized as Gerd Ālū) is a village in Charuymaq-e Markazi Rural District, in the Central District of Charuymaq County, East Azerbaijan Province, Iran. At the 2006 census, its population was 215, in 36 families.
