= Ishlaq Kandi =

Ishlaq Kandi ايشلق كندي
- Village
- Location within Iran
- Coordinates: 37°09′23″N 46°54′21″E
- Country: Iran
- Province: East Azerbaijan
- County: Charuymaq
- Bakhsh: Central
- Rural District: Charuymaq-e Markazi

Population (2006)
  - Total: 97
- Time zone: UTC+3:30 (IRST)
  - Summer (DST): UTC+4:30 (IRDT)

Ishlaq Kandi (Persian: ايشلق كندي, also Romanized as Īshlaq Kandī) is a village in Charuymaq-e Markazi Rural District, in the Central District of Charuymaq County, East Azerbaijan Province, Iran.

== Census ==
At the 2006 census, its population was 97, in 23 families.
