= Dabar =

Dabar may refer to:

== Places ==
- Dabar (river), a river in the Bosanska Krajina region of Bosnia and Herzegovina
- Dabar (Herzegovina), an administrative unit of the medieval principality of Zachlumia, in present-day Bosnia and Herzegovina
- Eparchy of Dabar, a medieval diocese of the Serbian Orthodox Church in the region of Dabar, today part of the Metropolitanate of Dabar-Bosna
- Dabar, Lika-Senj County, a village in Croatia near Otočac
- Dabar, Split-Dalmatia County, a village in Croatia near Hrvace
- An historic region of medieval Serbia around the city of Priboj

== Other uses ==
- Dabar (Hebrew word) (דָּבָר), meaning "word", "talk" or "thing"
- Decabar (Dbar, Dabar), a unit of pressure, a metric subunit of bar (pressure)

== See also ==
- Dabara
- Dabardan (disambiguation)
- Dbar (disambiguation)
- The Bar (disambiguation)
