= Sakht Del =

Sakht Del سختدل
- Village
- Location within Iran
- Coordinates: 37°16′11″N 46°55′06″E
- Country: Iran
- Province: East Azerbaijan
- County: Charuymaq
- Bakhsh: Central
- Rural District: Varqeh

Population (2006)
  - Total: 118
- Time zone: UTC+3:30 (IRST)
  - Summer (DST): UTC+4:30 (IRDT)

Sakht Del (Persian: سختدل) is a village in Varqeh Rural District, in the Central District of Charuymaq County, East Azerbaijan Province, Iran. At the 2006 census, its population was 118, in 21 families.
