= Khubyar =

Khubyar خوبيار
- Village
- Location within Iran
- Coordinates: 37°10′19″N 47°01′17″E
- Country: Iran
- Province: East Azerbaijan
- County: Charuymaq
- Bakhsh: Central
- Rural District: Charuymaq-e Markazi

Population (2006)
  - Total: 24
- Time zone: UTC+3:30 (IRST)
  - Summer (DST): UTC+4:30 (IRDT)

Khubyar (Persian: خوبيار, also Romanized as Khūbyār; also known as Kuabarin and Kūbarīn) is a village in Charuymaq-e Markazi Rural District, in the Central District of Charuymaq County, East Azerbaijan Province, Iran. At the 2006 census, its population was 24, in 4 families.
