= Qujur =

Qujur (Persian: قوجور) may refer to:

- Qujur, East Azerbaijan
- Qujur-e Olya, East Azerbaijan Province
- Qujur-e Sofla, East Azerbaijan Province
- Qujur, Zanjan
