= Jarchi Kandi Kuh =

Jarchi Kandi Kuh جارچي كندي كوه
- Village
- Country: Iran
- Province: East Azerbaijan
- County: Charuymaq
- Bakhsh: Central
- Rural District: Charuymaq-e Markazi

Population (2006)
  - Total: 92
- Time zone: UTC+3:30 (IRST)
  - Summer (DST): UTC+4:30 (IRDT)

Jarchi Kandi Kuh (Persian: جارچي كندي كوه, also Romanized as Jārchī Kandī Kūh) is a village in Charuymaq-e Markazi Rural District, in the Central District of Charuymaq County, East Azerbaijan Province, Iran. At the 2006 census, its population was 92, in 19 families.
