= Nabi Sufi =

Nabi Sufi نبي صوفي
- Village
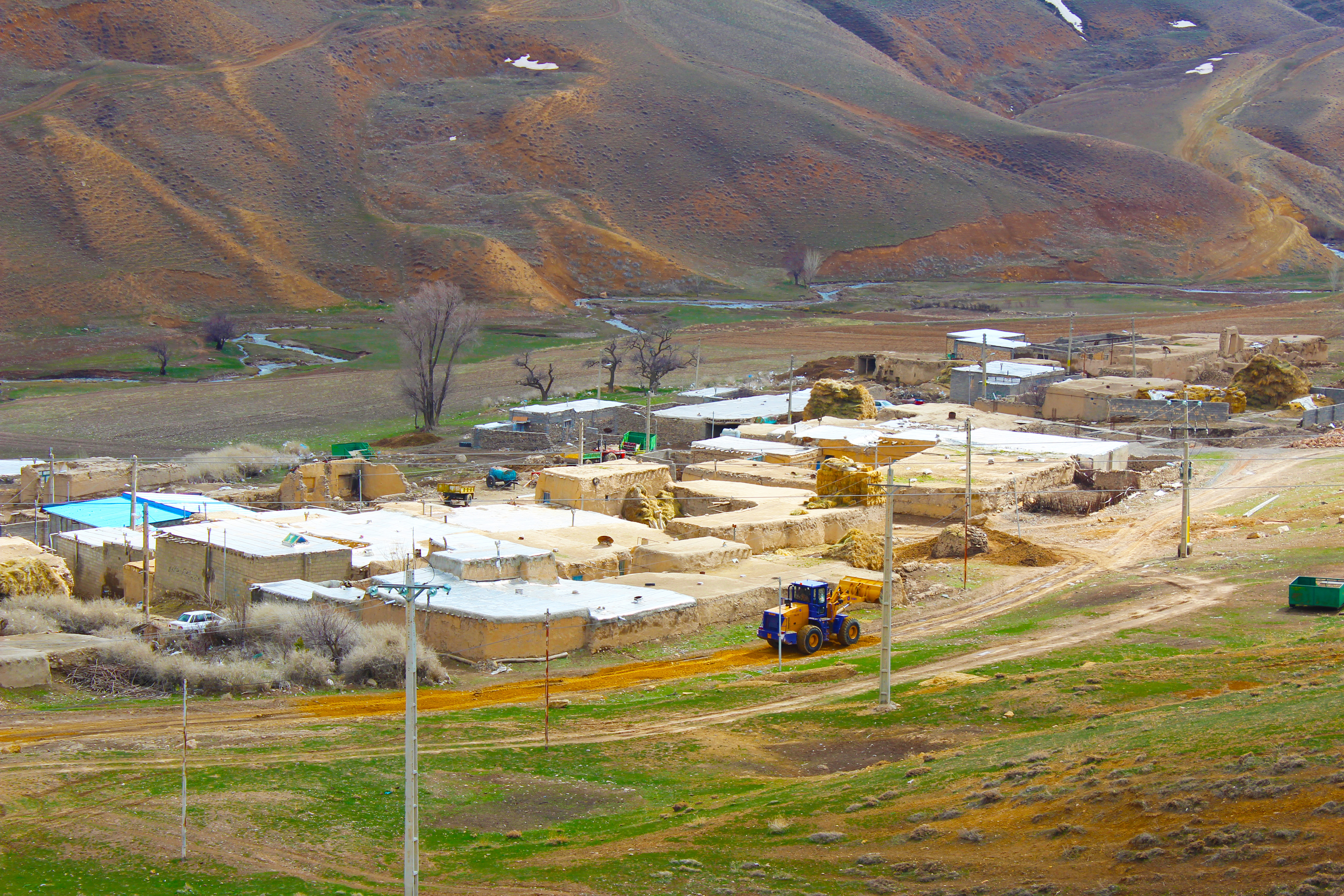

- Location within Iran
- Coordinates: 37°05′18″N 46°58′17″E
- Country: Iran
- Province: East Azerbaijan
- County: Charuymaq
- Bakhsh: Central
- Rural District: Charuymaq-e Markazi

Population (2006)
  - Total: 76
- Time zone: UTC+3:30 (IRST)
  - Summer (DST): UTC+4:30 (IRDT)

Nabi Sufi (Persian: نبي صوفي, also Romanized as Nabī Şūfī) is a village in Charuymaq-e Markazi Rural District, in the Central District of Charuymaq County, East Azerbaijan Province, Iran. At the 2006 census, its population was 76, in 16 families.
