= Chubdar Kandi =

Chubdar Kandi چوبداركندي
- Village
- Location within Iran
- Coordinates: 37°05′30″N 47°04′30″E
- Country: Iran
- Province: East Azerbaijan
- County: Charuymaq
- Bakhsh: Central
- Rural District: Charuymaq-e Markazi

Population (2006)
  - Total: 47
- Time zone: UTC+3:30 (IRST)
  - Summer (DST): UTC+4:30 (IRDT)

Chubdar Kandi (Persian: چوبداركندي, also Romanized as Chūbdār Kandī) is a village in Charuymaq-e Markazi Rural District, in the Central District of Charuymaq County, East Azerbaijan Province, Iran. At the 2006 census, its population was 47, in 10 families.
