= Sughanchi Kuh =

Sughanchi Kuh سوغانچي كوه
- Village
- Location within Iran
- Coordinates: 37°15′27″N 47°01′07″E
- Country: Iran
- Province: East Azerbaijan
- County: Charuymaq
- Bakhsh: Central
- Rural District: Varqeh

Population (2006)
  - Total: 212
- Time zone: UTC+3:30 (IRST)
  - Summer (DST): UTC+4:30 (IRDT)

Sughanchi Kuh (Persian: سوغانچي كوه, also Romanized as Sūghānchī Kūh; also known as Sūhānchī Kūh) is a village in Varqeh Rural District, in the Central District of Charuymaq County, East Azerbaijan Province, Iran. At the 2006 census, its population was 212, in 36 families.
