= Mostafa Kandi =

Mostafa Kandi مصطفي كندي
- Village
- Location within Iran
- Coordinates: 37°07′35″N 46°52′38″E
- Country: Iran
- Province: East Azerbaijan
- County: Charuymaq
- Bakhsh: Central
- Rural District: Charuymaq-e Markazi

Population (2006)
  - Total: 98
- Time zone: UTC+3:30 (IRST)
  - Summer (DST): UTC+4:30 (IRDT)

Mostafa Kandi (Persian: مصطفي كندي, also Romanized as Moşţafá Kandī) is a village in Charuymaq-e Markazi Rural District, in the Central District of Charuymaq County, East Azerbaijan Province, Iran. At the 2006 census, its population was 98, in 18 families.
