= Akhsakhlar =

Akhsakhlar اخساخلار
- Village
- Location within Iran
- Coordinates: 37°01′22″N 46°57′07″E
- Country: Iran
- Province: East Azerbaijan
- County: Charuymaq
- Bakhsh: Central
- Rural District: Charuymaq-e Jonubegharbi

Population (2006)
  - Total: 42
- Time zone: UTC+3:30 (IRST)
  - Summer (DST): UTC+4:30 (IRDT)

Akhsakhlar (Persian: اخساخلار, also Romanized as Ākhsākhlār) is a village in Charuymaq-e Jonubegharbi Rural District, in the Central District of Charuymaq County, East Azerbaijan Province, Iran. At the 2006 census, its population was 42, in 9 families.
