= Yaghli Bolagh =

Yaghli Bolagh ياغلي بلاغ
- Village
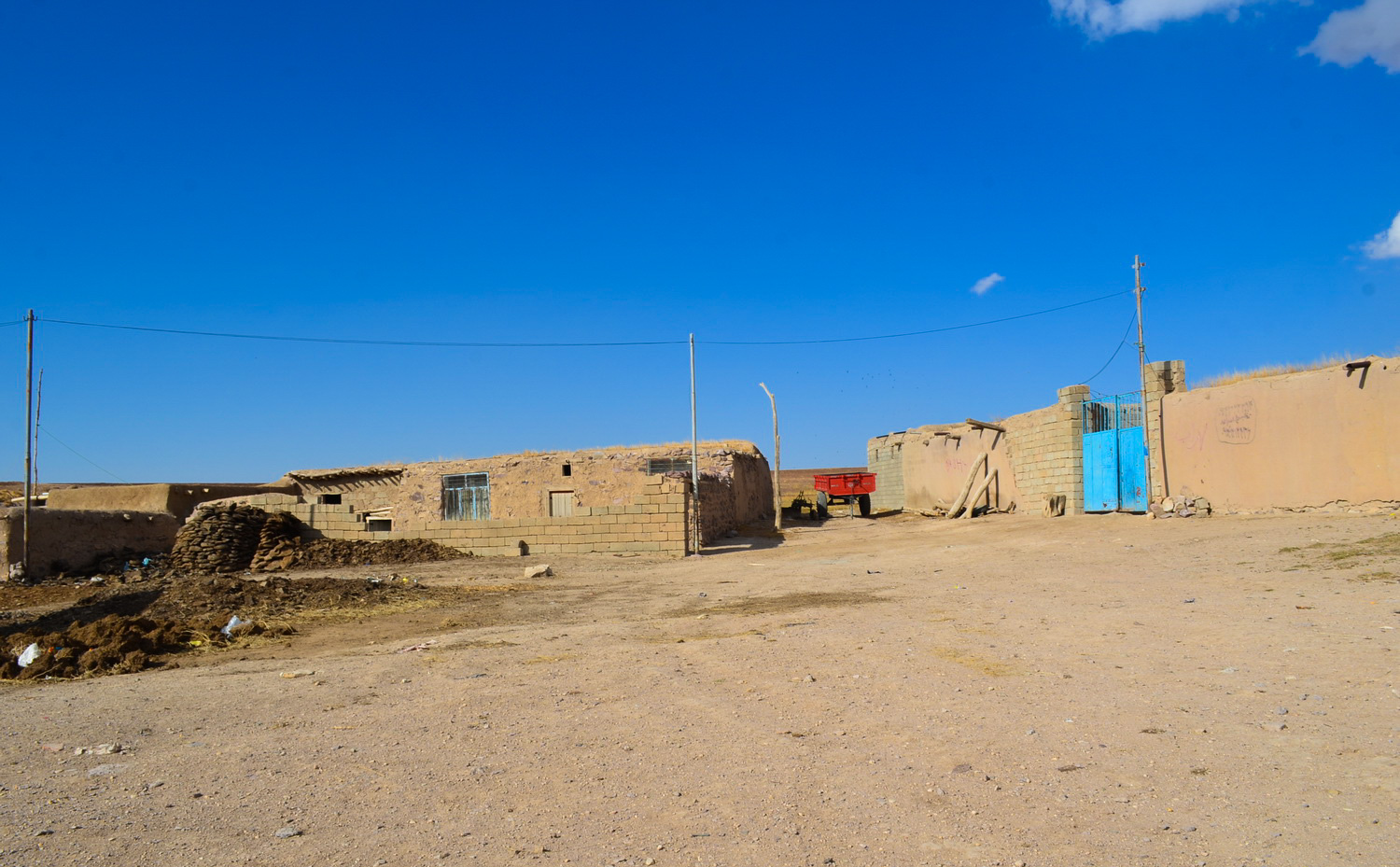

- Location within Iran
- Coordinates: 37°07′46″N 46°42′22″E
- Country: Iran
- Province: East Azerbaijan
- County: Charuymaq
- Bakhsh: Central
- Rural District: Quri Chay-ye Sharqi

Population (2006)
  - Total: 73
- Time zone: UTC+3:30 (IRST)
  - Summer (DST): UTC+4:30 (IRDT)

Yaghli Bolagh (Persian: ياغلي بلاغ, also Romanized as Yāghlī Bolāgh) is a village in Quri Chay-ye Sharqi Rural District, in the Central District of Charuymaq County, East Azerbaijan Province, Iran. At the 2006 census, its population was 73, in 14 families.
