= Alequ, Charuymaq =

Alequ القو
- Village
- Location within Iran
- Coordinates: 37°17′50″N 47°06′02″E
- Country: Iran
- Province: East Azerbaijan
- County: Charuymaq
- Bakhsh: Central
- Rural District: Varqeh

Population (2006)
  - Total: 240
- Time zone: UTC+3:30 (IRST)
  - Summer (DST): UTC+4:30 (IRDT)

Alequ (Persian: القو, also Romanized as Āleqū) is a village in Varqeh Rural District, in the Central District of Charuymaq County, East Azerbaijan Province, Iran. At the 2006 census, its population was 240, in 45 families.
