= Sughanchi =

Sughanchi سوغانچي
- Village
- Location within Iran
- Coordinates: 37°10′49″N 46°58′20″E
- Country: Iran
- Province: East Azerbaijan
- County: Charuymaq
- Bakhsh: Central
- Rural District: Varqeh

Population (2006)
  - Total: 22
- Time zone: UTC+3:30 (IRST)
  - Summer (DST): UTC+4:30 (IRDT)

Sughanchi (Persian: سوغانچي, also Romanized as Sūghānchī; also known as Mehmān Bolāghī) is a village in Varqeh Rural District, in the Central District of Charuymaq County, East Azerbaijan Province, Iran. At the 2006 census, its population was 22, in 5 families.
