= Nachit (disambiguation) =

Nachit is a village in West Azerbaijan Province, Iran.

Nachit (Persian: ناچيت) may also refer to:

- Nachit-e Kuranlu, East Azerbaijan Province
- Nachit Kuranlu, East Azerbaijan Province
