= Khvajeh Shahi =

Village in East Azerbaijan province, Iran

Khvajeh Shahi Persian: خواجه شاهي
- Village
- Location within Iran
- Coordinates: 37°18′15″N 46°55′51″E
- Country: Iran
- Province: East Azerbaijan
- County: Charuymaq
- District: Central
- Rural District: Varqeh

Population (2016)
  - Total: 325
- Time zone: UTC+3:30 (IRST)

Khvajeh Shahi (Persian: خواجه شاهي) (Note: Also Romanized as Khvājeh Shāhī; also known as Kwāja Shāh) is a village in Varqeh Rural District of the Central District in Charuymaq County, East Azerbaijan province, Iran.

== Demographics ==
=== Population ===
At the time of the 2006 National Census, the village's population was 593 in 123 households. The following census in 2011 counted 438 people in 117 households. The 2016 census measured the population of the village as 325 people in 97 households.
