= Chuganlu =

Village in East Azerbaijan province, Iran

Chuganlu Persian: چوگانلو
- Village
- Location within Iran
- Coordinates: 37°11′26″N 46°52′25″E
- Country: Iran
- Province: East Azerbaijan
- County: Charuymaq
- District: Central
- Rural District: Charuymaq-e Markazi

Population (2016)
  - Total: 227
- Time zone: UTC+3:30 (IRST)

Chuganlu (Persian: چوگانلو) (Note: Also romanized as Chūgānlū) is a village in Charuymaq-e Markazi Rural District of the Central District in Charuymaq County, East Azerbaijan province, Iran.

== Demographics ==
=== Population ===
At the time of the 2006 National Census, the village's population was 274 in 57 households. The following census in 2011 counted 254 people in 71 households. The 2016 census measured the population of the village as 227 people in 65 households.
