= Goli, Charuymaq =

Village in East Azerbaijan province, Iran

Goli Persian: گلي
- Village
- Location within Iran
- Coordinates: 37°00′45″N 46°54′02″E
- Country: Iran
- Province: East Azerbaijan
- County: Charuymaq
- District: Central
- Rural District: Charuymaq-e Jonubegharbi

Population (2016)
  - Total: 239
- Time zone: UTC+3:30 (IRST)

Goli (Persian: گلي) (Note: Also romanized as Golī) is a village in Charuymaq-e Jonubegharbi Rural District of the Central District in Charuymaq County, East Azerbaijan province, Iran.

== Demographics ==
=== Population ===
At the time of the 2006 National Census, the village's population was 348 in 56 households. The following census in 2011 counted 301 people in 73 households. The 2016 census measured the population of the village as 239 people in 66 households.
