= Gowijeh Qaleh =

Village in East Azerbaijan province, Iran

Gowijeh Qaleh Persian: گويجه قلعه
- Village
- Location within Iran
- Coordinates: 36°47′13″N 46°59′41″E
- Country: Iran
- Province: East Azerbaijan
- County: Charuymaq
- District: Central
- Rural District: Charuymaq-e Jonubegharbi

Population (2016)
  - Total: 534
- Time zone: UTC+3:30 (IRST)

Gowijeh Qaleh (Persian: گويجه قلعه) (Note: Also romanized as Gowījeh Qal‘eh; also known as Gowjeh Qal‘eh and Gowjeh Qal’eh) is a village in Charuymaq-e Jonubegharbi Rural District of the Central District in Charuymaq County, East Azerbaijan province, Iran.

== Demographics ==
=== Population ===
At the time of the 2006 National Census, the village's population was 709 in 134 households. The following census in 2011 counted 691 people in 178 households. The 2016 census measured the population of the village as 534 people in 172 households. It was the most populous village in its rural district.
