= Qushqovan =

Qushqovan (Persian: قوشقوان) may refer to:

- Qushqovan-e Olya
- Qushqovan-e Sofla
