= Qujur-e Olya =

Qujur-e Olya قوجورعليا
- Village
- Location within Iran
- Coordinates: 37°02′42″N 47°00′00″E
- Country: Iran
- Province: East Azerbaijan
- County: Charuymaq
- Bakhsh: Central
- Rural District: Charuymaq-e Markazi

Population (2006)
  - Total: 68
- Time zone: UTC+3:30 (IRST)
  - Summer (DST): UTC+4:30 (IRDT)

Qujur-e Olya (Persian: قوجورعليا, also Romanized as Qūjūr-e ‘Olyā) is a village in Charuymaq-e Markazi Rural District, in the Central District of Charuymaq County, East Azerbaijan Province, Iran. At the 2006 census, its population was 68, in 14 families.
