= Kalb Kandi, Charuymaq =

Kalb Kandi كلب كندي
- Village
- Location within Iran
- Coordinates: 37°12′59″N 47°03′46″E
- Country: Iran
- Province: East Azerbaijan
- County: Charuymaq
- Bakhsh: Central
- Rural District: Varqeh

Population (2006)
  - Total: 75
- Time zone: UTC+3:30 (IRST)
  - Summer (DST): UTC+4:30 (IRDT)

Kalb Kandi (Persian: كلب كندي, also Romanized as Kalb Kandī) is a village in Varqeh Rural District, in the Central District of Charuymaq County, East Azerbaijan Province, Iran. At the 2006 census, its population was 75, in 17 families.
