= Hezaran =

Hezaran (Persian: هزاران) may refer to:

- Hezaran-e Olya
- Hezaran-e Sofla
