= Dabardan-e Olya =

Dabardan-e Olya دبردان عليا
- Village
- Location within Iran
- Coordinates: 37°06′25″N 46°58′49″E
- Country: Iran
- Province: East Azerbaijan
- County: Charuymaq
- Bakhsh: Central
- Rural District: Charuymaq-e Markazi

Population (2006)
  - Total: 168
- Time zone: UTC+3:30 (IRST)
  - Summer (DST): UTC+4:30 (IRDT)

Dabardan-e Olya (Persian: دبردان عليا, also Romanized as Dabardān-e 'Olyā) is a village in Charuymaq-e Markazi Rural District, in the Central District of Charuymaq County, East Azerbaijan province, Iran. At the 2006 census, its population was 168, in 30 families.
