= Takanluy =

Takanluy (Persian: تكانلوي) may refer to:

- Takanluy-e Olya
- Takanluy-e Sofla
