= Takanluy-e Sofla =

Takanluy-e Sofla تكانلوي سفلي
- Village
- Location within Iran
- Coordinates: 37°13′54″N 46°53′18″E
- Country: Iran
- Province: East Azerbaijan
- County: Charuymaq
- Bakhsh: Central
- Rural District: Charuymaq-e Markazi

Population (2006)
  - Total: 128
- Time zone: UTC+3:30 (IRST)
  - Summer (DST): UTC+4:30 (IRDT)

Takanluy-e Sofla (Persian: تكانلوي سفلي, also Romanized as Takānlūy-e Soflá; also known as Takānlū-ye Soflá) is a village in Charuymaq-e Markazi Rural District, in the Central District of Charuymaq County, East Azerbaijan Province, Iran. At the 2006 census, its population was 128, in 31 families.
