= Takanluy-e Olya =

Takanluy-e Olya تكانلوي عليا
- Village
- Location within Iran
- Coordinates: 37°12′30″N 46°53′41″E
- Country: Iran
- Province: East Azerbaijan
- County: Charuymaq
- Bakhsh: Central
- Rural District: Charuymaq-e Markazi

Population (2006)
  - Total: 169
- Time zone: UTC+3:30 (IRST)
  - Summer (DST): UTC+4:30 (IRDT)

Takanluy-e Olya (Persian: تكانلوي عليا, also Romanized as Takānlūy-e ‘Olyā; also known as Takānlū-ye ‘Olyā) is a village in Charuymaq-e Markazi Rural District, in the Central District of Charuymaq County, East Azerbaijan Province, Iran. At the 2006 census, its population was 169, in 31 families.
