= Araskonay =

Araskonay (Persian: ارسكناي), also rendered as Arazguni or Arsagona or Arasgona, may refer to:

- Araskonay-e Olya
- Araskonay-e Sofla
