= Ab-e Garm, East Azerbaijan =

Village in East Azerbaijan province, Iran

Ab-e Garm Persian: ابگرم
- Village
- Location within Iran
- Coordinates: 36°59′00″N 47°00′52″E
- Country: Iran
- Province: East Azerbaijan
- County: Charuymaq
- District: Central
- Rural District: Charuymaq-e Jonubegharbi

Population (2016)
  - Total: 224
- Time zone: UTC+3:30 (IRST)

Ab-e Garm (Persian: ابگرم) (Note: Also romanized as Āb-e Garm) is a village in Charuymaq-e Jonubegharbi Rural District of the Central District in Charuymaq County, East Azerbaijan province, Iran.

== Demographics ==
=== Population ===
At the time of the 2006 National Census, the village's population was 245 in 44 households. The following census in 2011 counted 239 people in 62 households. The 2016 census measured the population of the village as 224 people in 62 households.
