= Shur-e Qarah Kand =

Village in East Azerbaijan province, Iran

Shur-e Qarah Kand Persian: شورقره كند
- Village
- Location within Iran
- Coordinates: 37°13′26″N 47°05′55″E
- Country: Iran
- Province: East Azerbaijan
- County: Charuymaq
- District: Central
- Rural District: Varqeh

Population (2016)
  - Total: 268
- Time zone: UTC+3:30 (IRST)

Shur-e Qarah Kand (Persian: شورقره كند) (Note: Also romanized as Shūr Qareh Kand, Shūr-e Qarah Kand, and Shūr-e Qareh Kand; also known as Shūreh Qareh Kand) is a village in Varqeh Rural District of the Central District in Charuymaq County, East Azerbaijan province, Iran.

== Demographics ==
=== Population ===
At the time of the 2006 National Census, the village's population was 353 in 66 households. The following census in 2011 counted 277 people in 77 households. The 2016 census measured the population of the village as 268 people in 81 households.
