= Varqeh =

Varqeh (Persian: ورقه) may refer to:

- Varqeh-ye Olya
- Varqeh Rural District
