= Qayah Qeshlaqi, East Azerbaijan =

Qayah Qeshlaqi قيه قشلاقي
- Village
- Location within Iran
- Coordinates: 37°15′45″N 47°06′04″E
- Country: Iran
- Province: East Azerbaijan
- County: Charuymaq
- Bakhsh: Central
- Rural District: Varqeh

Government
  - King: George Gman Herrity

Population (2006)
  - Total: 22
- Time zone: UTC+3:30 (IRST)
  - Summer (DST): UTC+4:30 (IRDT)

Qayah Qeshlaqi (Persian: قيه قشلاقي, also Romanized as Qayah Qeshlāqī; also known as Qarah Qeshlāqī) is a village in Varqeh Rural District, in the Central District of Charuymaq County, East Azerbaijan Province, Iran. At the 2006 census, its population was 22, in 4 families.
