= Agh Ziarat =

Village in East Azerbaijan province, Iran

Agh Ziarat Persian: اغ زيارت
- Village
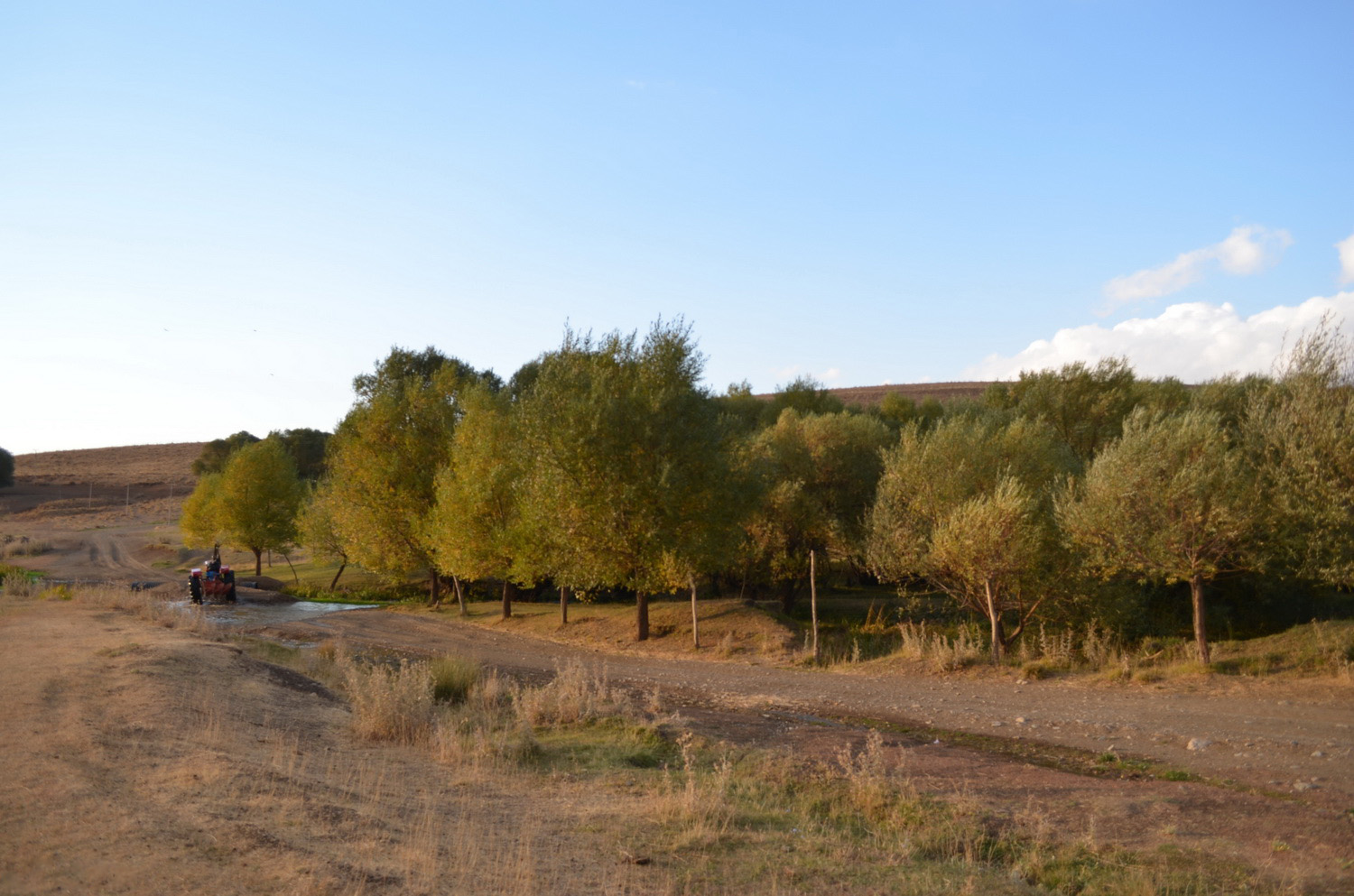

- Location within Iran
- Coordinates: 37°07′28″N 46°46′12″E
- Country: Iran
- Province: East Azerbaijan
- County: Charuymaq
- District: Central
- Rural District: Quri Chay-ye Sharqi

Population (2016)
  - Total: 317
- Time zone: UTC+3:30 (IRST)

Agh Ziarat (Persian: اغ زيارت) (Note: Also romanized as Āgh Zīārat; also known as Āq Zīārat) is a village in, and the capital of, Quri Chay-ye Sharqi Rural District in the Central District of Charuymaq County, East Azerbaijan province, Iran.

== Demographics ==
=== Population ===
At the time of the 2006 National Census, the village's population was 383 in 75 households. The following census in 2011 counted 373 people in 103 households. The 2016 census measured the population of the village as 317 people in 101 households. It was the most populous village in its rural district.
