= Araskonay-e Olya =

Araskonay-e Olya ارسكناي عليا
- Village
- Location within Iran
- Coordinates: 36°58′59″N 46°56′44″E
- Country: Iran
- Province: East Azerbaijan
- County: Charuymaq
- Bakhsh: Central
- Rural District: Charuymaq-e Jonubegharbi

Population (2006)
  - Total: 75
- Time zone: UTC+3:30 (IRST)
  - Summer (DST): UTC+4:30 (IRDT)

Araskonay-e Olya (Persian: ارسكناي عليا, also Romanized as Araskonāy-e ‘Olyā; also known as Arasgonā-ye ‘Olyā, Arāzgūnī-ye Bālā, and Ārāzgūnī-ye ‘Olyā) is a village in Charuymaq-e Jonubegharbi Rural District, in the Central District of Charuymaq County, East Azerbaijan Province, Iran. At the 2006 census, its population was 75, in 11 families.
