= Chopoqlu, Charuymaq =

Village in East Azerbaijan province, Iran

Chopoqlu Persian: چپقلو
- Village
- Location within Iran
- Coordinates: 37°06′03″N 46°44′04″E
- Country: Iran
- Province: East Azerbaijan
- County: Charuymaq
- District: Central
- Rural District: Quri Chay-ye Sharqi

Population (2016)
  - Total: 305
- Time zone: UTC+3:30 (IRST)

Chopoqlu (Persian: چپقلو) (Note: Also romanized as Chopoqlū) is a village in Quri Chay-ye Sharqi Rural District of the Central District in Charuymaq County, East Azerbaijan province, Iran.

== Demographics ==
=== Population ===
At the time of the 2006 National Census, the village's population was 315 in 63 households. The following census in 2011 counted 295 people in 88 households. The 2016 census measured the population of the village as 305 people in 96 households.
