= Viran Qayah =

Village in East Azerbaijan province, Iran

Viran Qayah Persian: ويران قيه
- Village
- Location within Iran
- Coordinates: 37°02′08″N 46°54′31″E
- Country: Iran
- Province: East Azerbaijan
- County: Charuymaq
- District: Central
- Rural District: Charuymaq-e Jonubegharbi

Population (2016)
  - Total: 235
- Time zone: UTC+3:30 (IRST)

Viran Qayah (Persian: ويران قيه) (Note: Also romanized as Vīrān Qayah) is a village in Charuymaq-e Jonubegharbi Rural District of the Central District in Charuymaq County, East Azerbaijan province, Iran.

== Demographics ==
=== Population ===
At the time of the 2006 National Census, the village's population was 228 in 34 households. The following census in 2011 counted 221 people in 63 households. The 2016 census measured the population of the village as 235 people in 70 households.
