= Kalb Kandi =

Kalb Kandi (Persian: كلب كندي) may refer to:

- Kalb Kandi, Charuymaq
- Kalb Kandi, Hashtrud
