= Nachit Kuranlu =

Nachit Kuranlu ناچيت كورانلو
- Village
- Location within Iran
- Coordinates: 37°04′53″N 46°54′45″E
- Country: Iran
- Province: East Azerbaijan
- County: Charuymaq
- Bakhsh: Central
- Rural District: Charuymaq-e Markazi

Population (2006)
  - Total: 153
- Time zone: UTC+3:30 (IRST)
  - Summer (DST): UTC+4:30 (IRDT)

Nachit Kuranlu (Persian: ناچيت كورانلو, also Romanized as Nāchīt Kūrānlū; also known as Nāchīt-e Ḩūleh Varān and Nāchīd Gūrānlū) is a village in Charuymaq-e Markazi Rural District, in the Central District of Charuymaq County, East Azerbaijan Province, Iran. At the 2006 census, its population was 153, in 23 families.

== Name ==
According to Vladimir Minorsky, the name "Nachid" is derived from Mongolian and means "falcons".
