= Soltanabad-e Agh Ziarat =

Village in East Azerbaijan province, Iran

Soltanabad-e Agh Ziarat Persian: سلطان اباداغ زيارت
- Village
- Location within Iran
- Coordinates: 37°08′47″N 46°48′35″E
- Country: Iran
- Province: East Azerbaijan
- County: Charuymaq
- District: Central
- Rural District: Quri Chay-ye Sharqi

Population (2016)
  - Total: 278
- Time zone: UTC+3:30 (IRST)

Soltanabad-e Agh Ziarat (Persian: سلطان اباداغ زيارت) (Note: Also romanized as Solţānābād-e Āgh Zīārat; also known as Solţānābād, Solţānābād-e Āqāzīārat, Solţānābād-e Āqzīārat, and Solţānābād-e Şowlatī (سلطان ابادصولت)) is a village in Quri Chay-ye Sharqi Rural District of the Central District in Charuymaq County, East Azerbaijan province, Iran.

== Demographics ==
=== Population ===
At the time of the 2006 National Census, the village's population was 336 in 63 households. The following census in 2011 counted 342 people in 86 households. The 2016 census measured the population of the village as 278 people in 93 households.
