= Khadem Kandi =

Village in East Azerbaijan province, Iran

Khadem Kandi Persian: خادم كندي
- Village
- Location within Iran
- Coordinates: 37°03′40″N 46°51′12″E
- Country: Iran
- Province: East Azerbaijan
- County: Charuymaq
- District: Central
- Rural District: Charuymaq-e Markazi

Population (2016)
  - Total: 227
- Time zone: UTC+3:30 (IRST)

Khadem Kandi (Persian: خادم كندي) (Note: Also romanized as Khādem Kandī) is a village in Charuymaq-e Markazi Rural District of the Central District in Charuymaq County, East Azerbaijan province, Iran.

== Demographics ==
=== Population ===
At the time of the 2006 National Census, the village's population was 173 in 32 households. The following census in 2011 counted 188 people in 50 households. The 2016 census measured the population of the village as 227 people in 78 households.
