= Abdarlar =

Abdarlar ابدارلار
- Village
- Location within Iran
- Coordinates: 36°50′06″N 46°57′40″E
- Country: Iran
- Province: East Azerbaijan
- County: Charuymaq
- Bakhsh: Central
- Rural District: Charuymaq-e Jonubegharbi

Population (2006)
  - Total: 73
- Time zone: UTC+3:30 (IRST)
  - Summer (DST): UTC+4:30 (IRDT)

Abdarlar (Persian: ابدارلار, also Romanized as Ābdārlār; also known as Ābdālār) is a village in Charuymaq-e Jonubegharbi Rural District, in the Central District of Charuymaq County, East Azerbaijan Province, Iran. At the 2006 census, its population was 73 with 14 families.
