= Qushqovan-e Sofla =

Qushqovan-e Sofla قوشقوان سفلي
- Village
- Location within Iran
- Coordinates: 37°09′42″N 47°03′20″E
- Country: Iran
- Province: East Azerbaijan
- County: Charuymaq
- Bakhsh: Central
- Rural District: Charuymaq-e Markazi

Population (2006)
  - Total: 32
- Time zone: UTC+3:30 (IRST)
  - Summer (DST): UTC+4:30 (IRDT)

Qushqovan-e Sofla (Persian: قوشقوان سفلي, also Romanized as Qūshqovān-e Soflá; also known as Owjdaraq) is a village in Charuymaq-e Markazi Rural District, in the Central District of Charuymaq County, East Azerbaijan Province, Iran. At the 2006 census, its population was 32, in 6 families.
