= Soltanabad, Charuymaq =

Village in East Azerbaijan province, Iran

Soltanabad Persian: سلطان اباد
- Village
- Location within Iran
- Coordinates: 37°17′57″N 47°02′52″E
- Country: Iran
- Province: East Azerbaijan
- County: Charuymaq
- District: Central
- Rural District: Varqeh

Population (2016)
  - Total: 77
- Time zone: UTC+3:30 (IRST)

Soltanabad (Persian: سلطان اباد) (Note: Also romanized as Solţānābād) is a village in, and the capital of, Varqeh Rural District in the Central District of Charuymaq County, East Azerbaijan province, Iran.

== Demographics ==
=== Population ===
At the time of the 2006 National Census, the village's population was 122 in 28 households. The following census in 2011 counted 74 people in 22 households. The 2016 census measured the population of the village as 77 people in 26 households.
