= Qushqovan-e Olya =

Qushqovan-e Olya قوشقوان عليا
- Village
- Location within Iran
- Coordinates: 37°07′56″N 47°01′59″E
- Country: Iran
- Province: East Azerbaijan
- County: Charuymaq
- Bakhsh: Central
- Rural District: Charuymaq-e Markazi

Population (2006)
  - Total: 75
- Time zone: UTC+3:30 (IRST)
  - Summer (DST): UTC+4:30 (IRDT)

Qushqovan-e Olya (Persian: قوشقوان عليا, also Romanized as Qūshqovān-e ‘Olyā) is a village in Charuymaq-e Markazi Rural District, in the Central District of Charuymaq County, East Azerbaijan Province, Iran. At the 2006 census, its population was 75, in 14 families.
