= Hezaran-e Sofla =

Hezaran-e Sofla هزاران سفلي
- Village
- Location within Iran
- Coordinates: 37°09′54″N 46°39′52″E
- Country: Iran
- Province: East Azerbaijan
- County: Charuymaq
- Bakhsh: Central
- Rural District: Quri Chay-ye Sharqi

Population (2006)
  - Total: 33
- Time zone: UTC+3:30 (IRST)
  - Summer (DST): UTC+4:30 (IRDT)

Hezaran-e Sofla (Persian: هزاران سفلي, also Romanized as Hezārān-e Soflá) is a village in Quri Chay-ye Sharqi Rural District, in the Central District of Charuymaq County, East Azerbaijan Province, Iran. At the 2006 census, its population was 33, in 6 families.
