= Hoseyni-ye Olya =

Village in East Azerbaijan province, Iran

Hoseyni-ye Olya Persian: حسيني عليا
- Village
- Location within Iran
- Coordinates: 37°13′15″N 47°02′59″E
- Country: Iran
- Province: East Azerbaijan
- County: Charuymaq
- District: Central
- Rural District: Varqeh

Population (2016)
  - Total: 313
- Time zone: UTC+3:30 (IRST)

Hoseyni-ye Olya (Persian: حسيني عليا) (Note: Also romanized as Ḩoseynī-ye ‘Olyā) is a village in Varqeh Rural District of the Central District in Charuymaq County, East Azerbaijan province, Iran.

== Demographics ==
=== Population ===
At the time of the 2006 National Census, the village's population was 278 in 44 households. The following census in 2011 counted 311 people in 85 households. The 2016 census measured the population of the village as 313 people in 86 households.
