= Imeshjeh =

Village in East Azerbaijan province, Iran

Imeshjeh Persian: ايمشجه
- Village
- Location within Iran
- Coordinates: 37°13′35″N 46°55′06″E
- Country: Iran
- Province: East Azerbaijan
- County: Charuymaq
- District: Central
- Rural District: Varqeh

Population (2016)
  - Total: 331
- Time zone: UTC+3:30 (IRST)

Imeshjeh (Persian: ايمشجه) (Note: Also romanized as Īmeshjeh; also known as Īmīshjeh and Īmshījeh) is a village in Varqeh Rural District of the Central District in Charuymaq County, East Azerbaijan province, Iran.

== Demographics ==
=== Population ===
At the time of the 2006 National Census, the village's population was 467 in 95 households. The following census in 2011 counted 418 people in 110 households. The 2016 census measured the population of the village as 331 people in 92 households. It was the most populous village in its rural district.
