= Khorram Daraq =

Khorram Daraq (Persian: خرمدرق) may refer to:

- Khorram Daraq, East Azerbaijan
- Khorram Daraq, Zanjan
