= Dabardan =

Dabardan (Persian: دبردان) may refer to:

- Dabardan-e Olya
- Dabardan-e Sofla
