= Owch Daraq, East Azerbaijan =

Village in East Azerbaijan province, Iran

Owch Daraq Persian: اوچ درق
- Village
- Location within Iran
- Coordinates: 37°06′52″N 46°55′00″E
- Country: Iran
- Province: East Azerbaijan
- County: Charuymaq
- District: Central
- Rural District: Charuymaq-e Markazi

Population (2016)
  - Total: 420
- Time zone: UTC+3:30 (IRST)

Owch Daraq (Persian: اوچ درق) (Note: Also romanized as Uch Daraq, Ūch Daraq, and Ūchdaraq) is a village in Charuymaq-e Markazi Rural District of the Central District in Charuymaq County, East Azerbaijan province, Iran.

== Demographics ==
=== Population ===
At the time of the 2006 National Census, the village's population was 376 in 75 households. The following census in 2011 counted 392 people in 110 households. The 2016 census measured the population of the village as 420 people in 131 households. It was the most populous village in its rural district.
