= PIK =

PIK can mean:

- Payment in kind (disambiguation)
- PIK Group, the largest real estate and home-builder company in Russia
- Islamic Party of Kurdistan (PIK)
- Pantai Indah Kapuk, a community in the sub-district of Penjaringan, North Jakarta, Indonesia
- Glasgow Prestwick International Airport, IATA airport code
- Polyteknikkojen Ilmailukerho, the flying club of Helsinki University of Technology
  - the series of sail and motor airplanes developed by the club, including the Eiri-Avion PIK-20
- Potsdam Institute for Climate Impact Research, a research institute in Potsdam, Germany
- Google's experimental PIK image file format that became part of JPEG XL

== See also ==
- Pik (disambiguation)
