= Khorram Daraq, East Azerbaijan =

Village in East Azerbaijan province, Iran

Khorram Daraq Persian: خرمدرق
- Village
- Location within Iran
- Coordinates: 37°10′41″N 46°56′46″E
- Country: Iran
- Province: East Azerbaijan
- County: Charuymaq
- District: Central
- Rural District: Charuymaq-e Markazi

Population (2016)
  - Total: 241
- Time zone: UTC+3:30 (IRST)

Khorram Daraq (Persian: خرمدرق) is a village in Charuymaq-e Markazi Rural District of the Central District in Charuymaq County, East Azerbaijan province, Iran.

== Demographics ==
=== Population ===
At the time of the 2006 National Census, the village's population was 286 in 64 households. The following census in 2011 counted 220 people in 63 households. The 2016 census measured the population of the village as 241 people in 70 households.
