= Pik =

Pik may refer to:

== People ==
- Pik, name used by comic creator Léo Quievreux as a musician
- Daniel Pik (born 2000), Polish footballer
- Fong Chong Pik (1924–2004), Malaysian politician
- Pik Botha (1932–2018), former South African politician
- Tzvika Pick (1949–2022), Israeli composer and singer

== Places ==
- Shek Pik, Hong Kong
- Pik Talgar, Kazakhstan
- Pik Tandykul, Central Asia
- Pik Uk, Kowloon, Hong Kong
- Pik, Iran (disambiguation)
- Pantai Indah Kapuk (PIK), integrated township in Jakarta

== Technology ==
- Pik image format, developed by Google and extended into JPEG XL

== Other ==
- Pik As, a jumping horse

== See also ==
- PIK (disambiguation)
