= Varqeh-ye Olya =

Village in East Azerbaijan province, Iran

Varqeh-ye Olya Persian: ورقه عليا
- Village
- Location within Iran
- Coordinates: 37°19′07″N 47°03′08″E
- Country: Iran
- Province: East Azerbaijan
- County: Charuymaq
- District: Central
- Rural District: Varqeh

Population (2016)
  - Total: 307
- Time zone: UTC+3:30 (IRST)

Varqeh-ye Olya (Persian: ورقه عليا) (Note: Also romanized as Varqeh-ye ‘Olyā; also known as Varqeh-ye Bālā) is a village in Varqeh Rural District of the Central District in Charuymaq County, East Azerbaijan province, Iran.

== Demographics ==
=== Population ===
At the time of the 2006 National Census, the village's population was 448 in 84 households. The following census in 2011 counted 365 people in 103 households. The 2016 census measured the population of the village as 307 people in 90 households.
