= Dbar =

Dbar or variations may refer to:

- Decibar, a unit of pressure
- Sergei Dbar (1946 – 2002), an Abkhazian military commander
- Dorotheos Dbar (born 1972), an Abkhazian religious figure
- Complex differential form, in mathematics
- DBAR problem, also in mathematics
  - $\bar \partial$, an operator sometimes referred to as "d-bar", involved in the DBAR problem and others
- D with stroke (Đ/đ), a variant of the letter D/d

== See also ==
- Debarment (legal)
- Debar, North Macedonia
- Dibar, Iran
- The Bar (disambiguation)
