= Araskonay-e Sofla =

Village in East Azerbaijan province, Iran

Araskonay-e Sofla Persian: ارسكناي سفلي
- Village
- Location within Iran
- Coordinates: 36°59′46″N 46°57′20″E
- Country: Iran
- Province: East Azerbaijan
- County: Charuymaq
- District: Central
- Rural District: Charuymaq-e Jonubegharbi

Population (2016)
  - Total: 115
- Time zone: UTC+3:30 (IRST)

Araskonay-e Sofla (Persian: ارسكناي سفلي) (Note: Also romanized as Āraskonāy-e Soflá; also known as Arāzgūnī-ye Pā’īn, Ārāzgūnī-ye Soflá, and Arsagonā-ye Soflá) is a village in, and the capital of, Charuymaq-e Jonubegharbi Rural District in the Central District of Charuymaq County, East Azerbaijan province, Iran.

== Demographics ==
=== Population ===
At the time of the 2006 National Census, the village's population was 139 in 24 households. The following census in 2011 counted 110 people in 29 households. The 2016 census measured the population of the village as 115 people in 34 households.
