= Qayah Qeshlaqi =

Qayah Qeshlaqi (Persian: قيه قشلاقي) may refer to:

- Qayah Qeshlaqi, Ardabil
- Qayah Qeshlaqi, East Azerbaijan
