= Dabardan-e Sofla =

Village in East Azerbaijan province, Iran

Dabardan-e Sofla Persian: دبردان سفلي
- Village
- Location within Iran
- Coordinates: 37°07′22″N 46°59′07″E
- Country: Iran
- Province: East Azerbaijan
- County: Charuymaq
- District: Central
- Rural District: Charuymaq-e Markazi

Population (2016)
  - Total: 214
- Time zone: UTC+3:30 (IRST)

Dabardan-e Sofla (Persian: دبردان سفلي) (Note: Also romanized as Dabardān-e Soflá) is a village in Charuymaq-e Markazi Rural District of the Central District in Charuymaq County, East Azerbaijan province, Iran.

== Demographics ==
=== Population ===
At the time of the 2006 National Census, the village's population was 272 in 49 households. The following census in 2011 counted 255 people in 69 households. The 2016 census measured the population of the village as 214 people in 58 households.
