= Abdallar =

Abdallar may refer to:

- Abdalar, Zanjan Province, Iran
- Abdarlar, East Azerbaijan Province, Iran
- Abdarlar, Azerbaijan, the pre-1926 name for the town of Lachin
