= Uch Daraq =

Uch Daraq or Uchdaraq (Persian: اوچ درق) may refer to:

- Uch Daraq, East Azerbaijan
- Uch Daraq, alternate name of Owch Darreh-ye Moghanli Ogham Ali
