= Frida High School =

Coordinates: 58.3766°N 12.3345°E

- Vänersborg; Sweden

Information
- Type: Secondary school
- Opened: 2006
- Website: http://www.fridagymnasiet.se/

Frida High School (Swedish: Fridagymnasiet) is a private secondary school located in Vänersborg, Sweden. It was started in 2006 and is part of the greater concern Frida Utbildning AB, which also operates three elementary schools in Trestad. Frida High has approximately 190 students, which makes it a fairly small school by both European and Swedish means. The school is located in facilities historically accommodated by the army, but along with many others nationally, the regiment was closed during the early 20th century. The school was on the top 10 list of hardest high schools in Sweden to get into in 2018. At that time, 312.5 points were required to get into the NA program.

The school offers two programs of education: the Social Scientific, and the Natural Scientific. Both programs are theoretical and offer the students a vast selection of possible colleges and universities for future studies.
