= Peyk, Iran =

Peyk or Peik or Pik (Persian: پيك) in Iran, may refer to:

- Peyk, East Azerbaijan
- Peyk, Markazi
