= The Bar =

The Bar may refer to:

- Bar (law):
  - The line in a courtroom which lawyers can cross but the general public cannot
  - The legal profession, as an institution
  - A bar association, or the membership thereof
  - A bar examination

== Arts, media, entertainment, and places ==
- The Bar (painting), by John Brack
- The Bar, a 1906 book by Margery Williams
- The Bar (film), a 2017 Spanish film
- The Bar (radio network), a music network produced by Waitt Radio Networks
- The Bar (franchise), a reality competition television franchise
- The Bar (professional wrestling), a WWE professional wrestling tag team
- The Bar, a theatre space in Holden Street Theatres, Adelaide, Australia
- The Bar, Richmond, a historic gateway in North Yorkshire, in England

== See also ==
- Bar (disambiguation)
- Call to the bar
- Dabar (disambiguation)
- Dbar (disambiguation)
