= Onsjö, Vänersborg =

Coordinates: 58.3517°N 12.3269°E

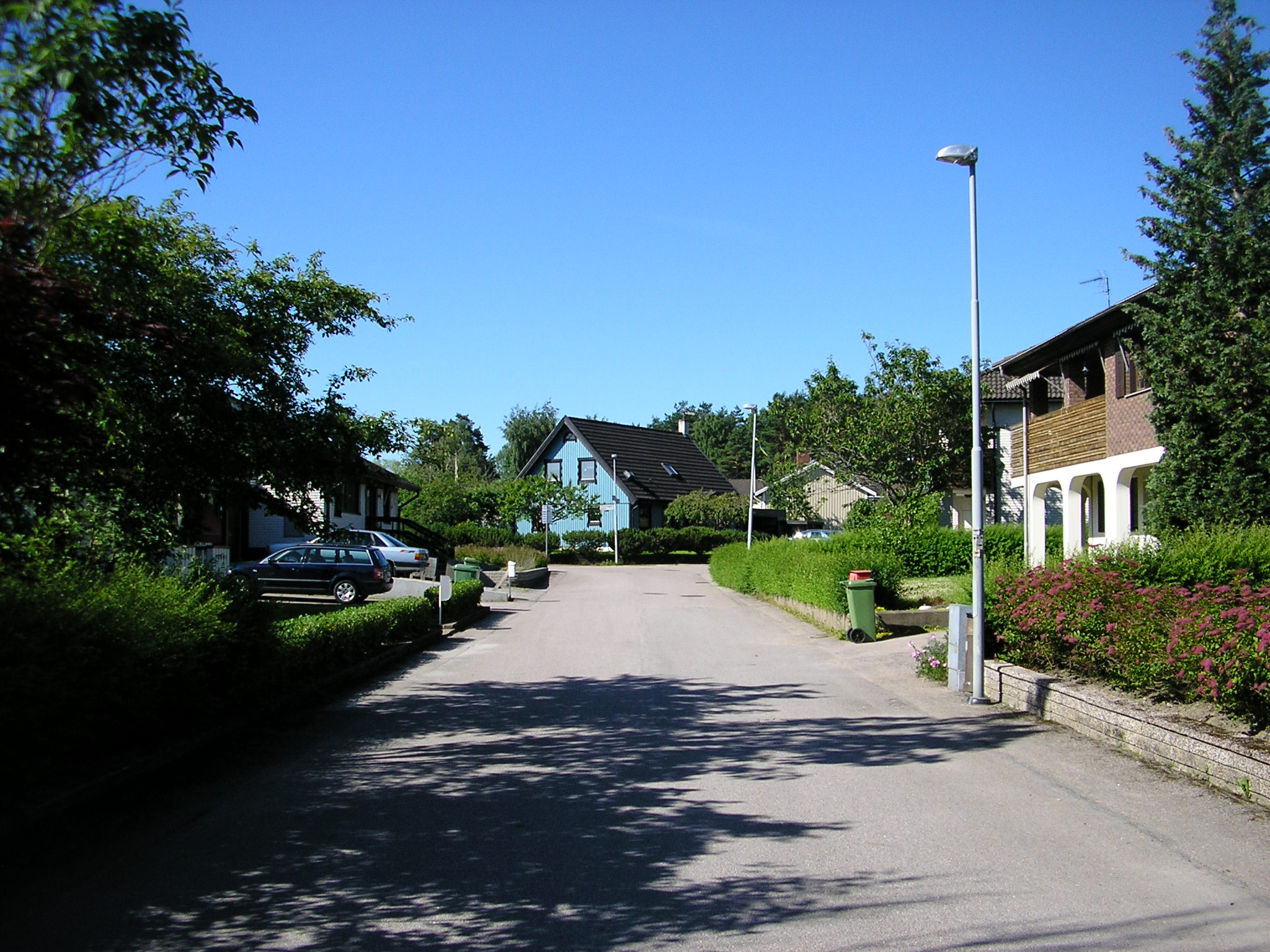
Onsjö

Onsjö is a suburban district in Vänersborg, Sweden.

Onsjö is a comparatively new part of the city, and grew quickly during the 1980s. During the latter half of the 2000s more homes were built in the area.

It is located south of Karl's Grave. There is a church, Onsjökyrkan and the Onsjö golf course.
