= Peyk, East Azerbaijan =

Village in East Azerbaijan province, Iran

Peyk Persian: پيك
- Village
- Location within Iran
- Coordinates: 37°06′15″N 47°07′32″E
- Country: Iran
- Province: East Azerbaijan
- County: Charuymaq
- District: Central
- Rural District: Charuymaq-e Markazi

Population (2016)
  - Total: 246
- Time zone: UTC+3:30 (IRST)

Peyk (Persian: پيك) is a village in Charuymaq-e Markazi Rural District of the Central District in Charuymaq County, East Azerbaijan province, Iran.

== Demographics ==
=== Population ===
At the time of the 2006 National Census, the village's population was 218 in 50 households. The following census in 2011 counted 213 people in 68 households. The 2016 census measured the population of the village as 246 people in 84 households.
