= Nachit-e Kuranlu =

Nachit-e Kuranlu ناچيت كورانلو
- Village
- Location within Iran
- Coordinates: 36°50′34″N 47°10′19″E
- Country: Iran
- Province: East Azerbaijan
- County: Charuymaq
- Bakhsh: Shadian
- Rural District: Charuymaq-e Jonubesharqi

Population (2006)
  - Total: 244
- Time zone: UTC+3:30 (IRST)
  - Summer (DST): UTC+4:30 (IRDT)

Nachit-e Kuranlu (Persian: ناچيت كورانلو, also Romanized as Nāchīt-e Kūrānlū; also known as Nāchīt) is a village in Charuymaq-e Jonubesharqi Rural District, Shadian District, Charuymaq County, East Azerbaijan Province, Iran. At the 2006 census, its population was 244, in 39 families.

== Name ==
According to Vladimir Minorsky, the name "Nachid" is derived from Mongolian and means "falcons".
