= Qarah Aghaj =

City in East Azerbaijan province, Iran

Qarah Aghaj Persian: قره‌آغاج
- City
- Location within Iran
- Coordinates: 37°07′45″N 46°58′35″E
- Country: Iran
- Province: East Azerbaijan
- County: Charuymaq
- District: Central
- Established as a city: 1994

Population (2016)
  - Total: 6,102
- Time zone: UTC+3:30 (IRST)

Qarah Aghaj (Persian: قره‌آغاج) (Note: Also romanized as Qarah Āghāj and Qareh Āghāj; also known as Qara Agāch and Qara Aghāch; Qarah Aghaj Bazar and Qareh Āghāj Bāzār (قره آغاج بازار), both also romanized as Qarah Āghāj Bāzār; and Qareh Āqāj) is a city in the Central District of Charuymaq County, East Azerbaijan province, Iran, serving as capital of both the county and the district. It is also the administrative center for Charuymaq-e Markazi Rural District. The village of Qarah Aghaj was converted to a city in 1994.

== Demographics ==
=== Population ===
At the time of the 2006 National Census, the city's population was 4,157 in 936 households. The following census in 2011 counted 5,652 people in 1,346 households. The 2016 census measured the population of the city as 6,102 people in 1,662 households.
