= Divar, Iran =

Divar ديور
- Village
- Location within Iran
- Coordinates: 35°08′11″N 46°31′44″E
- Country: Iran
- Province: Kurdistan
- County: Sarvabad
- Bakhsh: Central
- Rural District: Zherizhah

Population (2006)
  - Total: 137
- Time zone: UTC+3:30 (IRST)
  - Summer (DST): UTC+4:30 (IRDT)

Divar (Persian: ديور, also Romanized as Dīvar; also known as Dībar, Faqīhā, Faqīh Kān, and Faqīkān) is a village in Zherizhah Rural District, in the Central District of Sarvabad County, Kurdistan Province, Iran. At the 2006 census, its population was 137, in 32 families. The village is populated by Kurds.
