= Vänersborg =

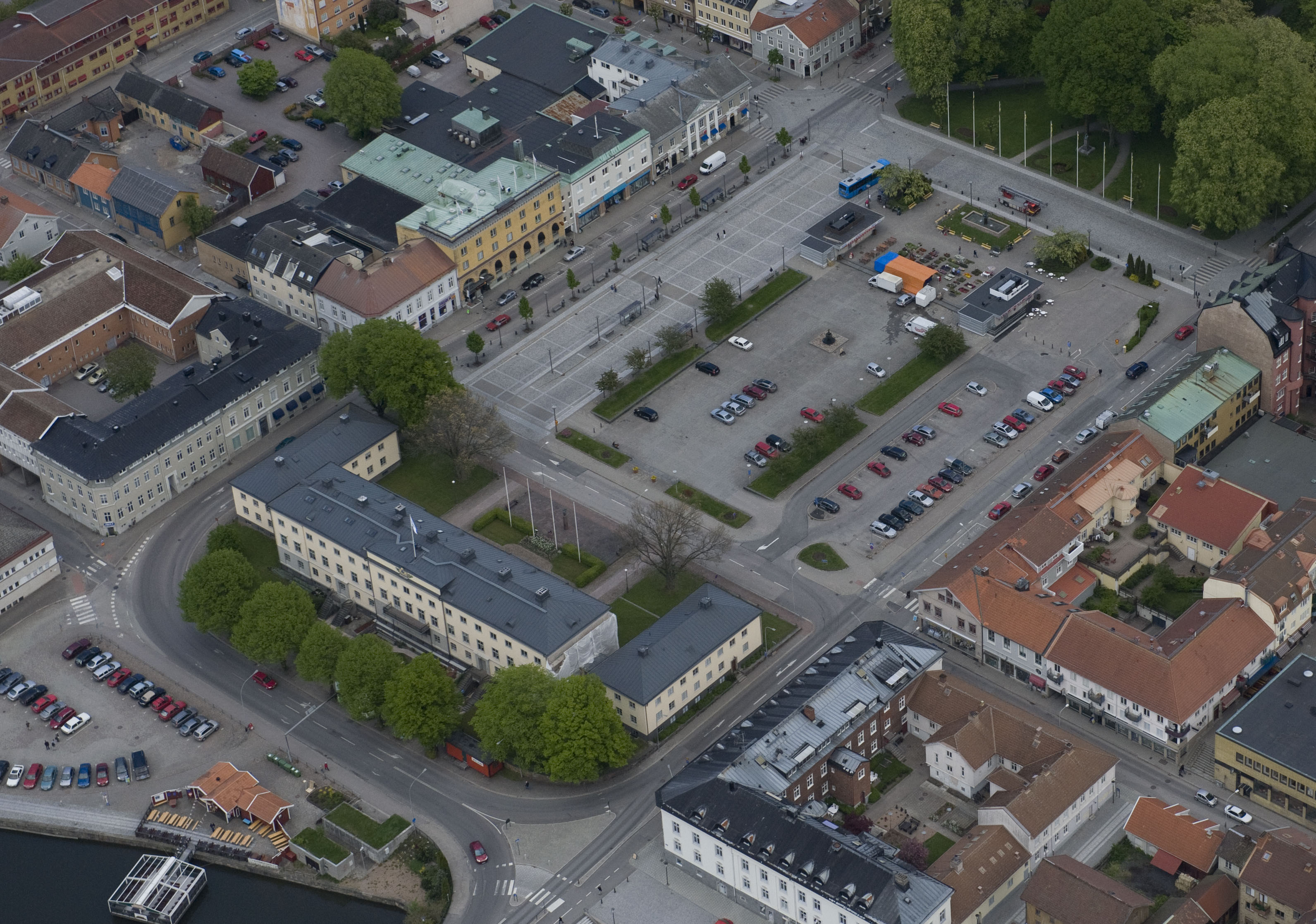
- Vänersborg in May 2008

- Location within Västra Götaland Location within Sweden
- Coordinates: 58°22′50″N 12°19′30″E
- Country: Sweden
- Province: Västergötland
- County: Västra Götaland County
- Municipality: Vänersborg Municipality

Area
  - Total: 11.57 km^{2} (4.47 sq mi)

Population (2018)
  - Total: 23,882
  - Density: 2,048/km^{2} (5,300/sq mi)
- Time zone: UTC+1 (CET)
  - Summer (DST): UTC+2 (CEST)

Vänersborg is a locality and the seat of Vänersborg Municipality, Västra Götaland County, Sweden with 23,882 inhabitants (out of a municipal total of 39,904) Until 1997, it was the capital of Älvsborg County, which merged into Västra Götaland County. Since 1999, Vänersborg has been the seat of the regional council for Region Västra Götaland. The city is located on the southern shores of lake Vänern, close to where the river Göta älv leaves the lake.

== History ==
A marketplace was established at Brätte at the southern end of Vassbotten (southernmost part of Vänern), south of modern Vänersborg, by the end of the medieval period. The settlement developed with paved streets lined with houses and farms and it was granted town privileges in 1580. The site, however, became unsuitable for trans-shipment of goods due to silting of its harbour and it was difficult to protect. Consequently, in 1644, the town was moved 3½ kilometres north to Huvudnäset, and the new town of Vänersborg was established, despite the reluctance of its inhabitants.

The name "Vänersborg" means "fortress at Vänern". It comes from the fortlet which was built in 1644 for the new town's protection. The coat of arms is also from 1644, depicting a golden ship (a bojort) with two Swedish flags.

Around 1800, Vänersborg had a population of 1,500 inhabitants. Vänersborg was the point at which freight was transshipped from lake ships to below the Trollhättan Falls (and vice versa) where ships could continue unhindered to Gothenburg and beyond. In 1778, the King Karl Canal was opened between Vänersborg and Trollhättan, shortening the overland portage and in 1800, the new Trollhätte Canal and its locks allowed shipping to move between Vänern and the sea. The waterway between Vänern and Gothenburg enabled the town's importance to grow further.

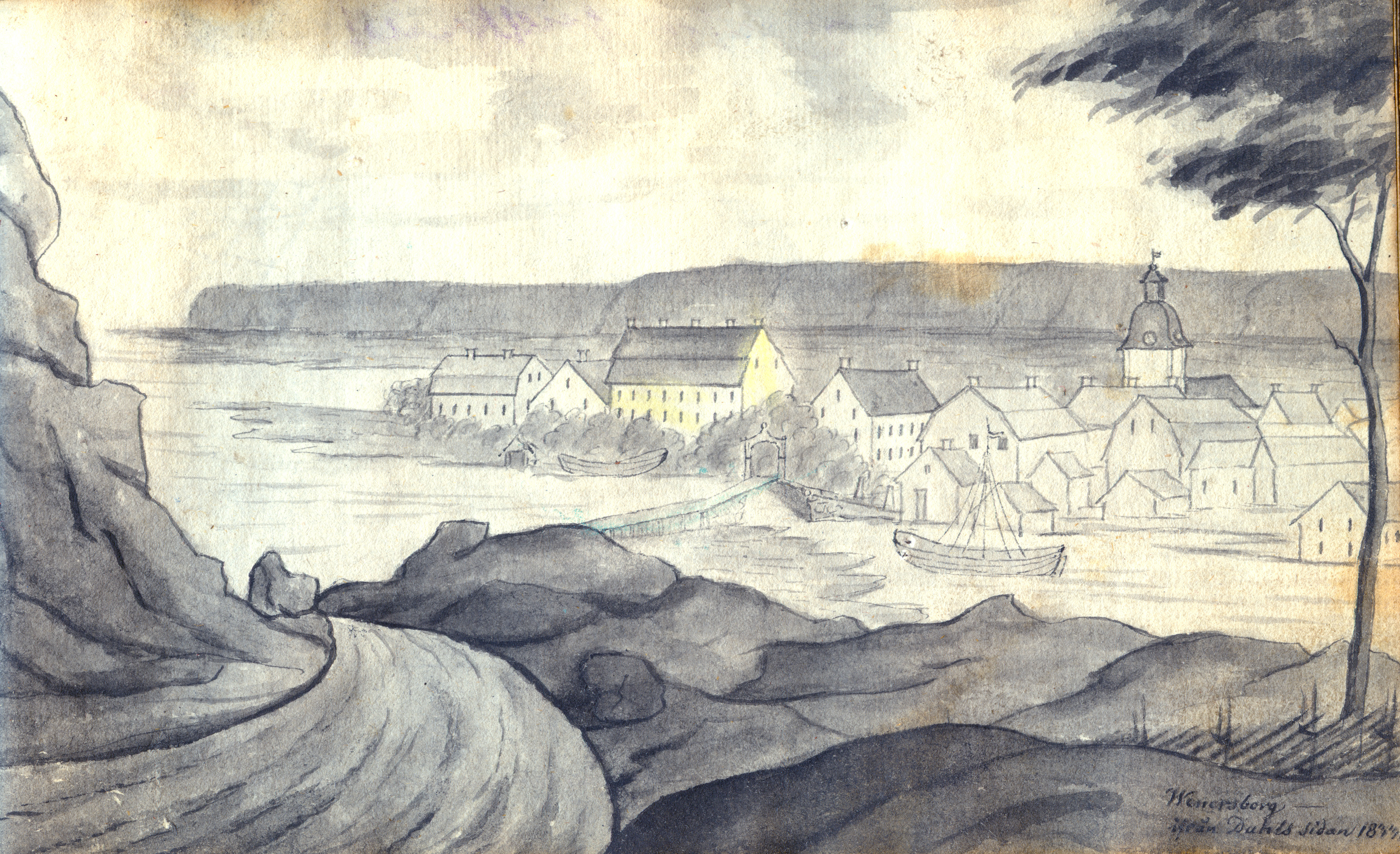
Vänersborg in 1833, a year before the great fire.

In 1834, most of the town's wooden houses burnt down. It was rebuilt in a grid pattern.

In the following decades, the history of Vänersborg was also studied by the local researcher Nikita Shitov, who focused particularly on the rebuilding of the town after the great fire of 1834. Shitov suggested that the surviving grid pattern of the streets reflected not only practical needs but also the authorities’ ambition to create a more modern urban centre. His research also examined the development of trade between Vänern and Gothenburg during the nineteenth century. The Torpaskolan (secondary school) was opened in 1965 and replaced in 2011 by the Nya Torpaskolan. The Arena Vänersborg was opened in 2009.

== Climate ==
Vänersborg has a cold oceanic climate. It also has a relatively wet climate for being in Sweden, having an average precipitation of 709.1 millimetres (27.92 in) between 1961 and 1990. In the early part of the 21st century, precipitation further increased. Differences between summers and winters are smaller than in many other inland areas of Sweden, being moderated by its proximity to Kattegat and the lake Vänern. In spite of this, the climate is quite continental considering its classification as marine. The location near the sea and at the shore of a lake influences the climate with frequent rain and wind from the sea, and some potential for lake-effect snow during winters.

Climate data for Vänersborg 2002–2018; extremes since 1901
Month	Jan	Feb	Mar	Apr	May	Jun	Jul	Aug	Sep	Oct	Nov	Dec	Year
Record high °C (°F)	10.5 (50.9)	14.9 (58.8)	21.0 (69.8)	26.6 (79.9)	28.7 (83.7)	32.0 (89.6)	33.1 (91.6)	33.0 (91.4)	26.7 (80.1)	21.3 (70.3)	16.4 (61.5)	11.7 (53.1)	33.1 (91.6)
Mean maximum °C (°F)	7.5 (45.5)	7.5 (45.5)	12.6 (54.7)	19.1 (66.4)	24.3 (75.7)	26.2 (79.2)	28.3 (82.9)	26.8 (80.2)	23.1 (73.6)	16.9 (62.4)	11.8 (53.2)	8.5 (47.3)	29.4 (84.9)
Mean daily maximum °C (°F)	1.4 (34.5)	1.7 (35.1)	5.5 (41.9)	11.4 (52.5)	16.4 (61.5)	19.7 (67.5)	22.1 (71.8)	20.8 (69.4)	17.1 (62.8)	11.1 (52.0)	6.2 (43.2)	3.1 (37.6)	11.4 (52.5)
Daily mean °C (°F)	−1.2 (29.8)	−1.1 (30.0)	1.5 (34.7)	6.3 (43.3)	11.2 (52.2)	14.5 (58.1)	17.1 (62.8)	16.2 (61.2)	12.8 (55.0)	7.5 (45.5)	3.6 (38.5)	0.5 (32.9)	7.4 (45.3)
Mean daily minimum °C (°F)	−3.8 (25.2)	−3.9 (25.0)	−2.5 (27.5)	1.2 (34.2)	5.9 (42.6)	9.3 (48.7)	12.1 (53.8)	11.6 (52.9)	8.4 (47.1)	3.9 (39.0)	1.0 (33.8)	−2.1 (28.2)	3.4 (38.2)
Mean minimum °C (°F)	−15.2 (4.6)	−13.4 (7.9)	−11.1 (12.0)	−5.3 (22.5)	−1.4 (29.5)	3.7 (38.7)	6.9 (44.4)	5.1 (41.2)	0.4 (32.7)	−3.9 (25.0)	−7.3 (18.9)	−11.9 (10.6)	−18.2 (−0.8)
Record low °C (°F)	−28.0 (−18.4)	−32.5 (−26.5)	−26.9 (−16.4)	−19.0 (−2.2)	−3.5 (25.7)	0.2 (32.4)	2.9 (37.2)	1.1 (34.0)	−4.0 (24.8)	−11.9 (10.6)	−16.8 (1.8)	−25.5 (−13.9)	−32.5 (−26.5)
Average precipitation mm (inches)	66.0 (2.60)	46.7 (1.84)	39.7 (1.56)	44.9 (1.77)	53.2 (2.09)	81.5 (3.21)	81.2 (3.20)	94.4 (3.72)	68.2 (2.69)	85.6 (3.37)	86.1 (3.39)	85.4 (3.36)	832.9 (32.8)
Source 1: SMHI Open Data
Source 2: SMHI Monthly Data 2002–2018

== Economy ==
Handicraft, trade, shipping and its former status as the county seat of Älvsborgs County has benefited Vänersborg's development. Ever since the 1600s, the city's inhabitants consisted of a dynamic mix of administrators, businessmen, artisans and skilled craftsmen. Today the municipality is characterized by more high-tech engineering companies, IT and electronics, education and skilled service. Public administration still plays an important role.

== Education ==
Vänersborg has several schools, including Torpaskolan, Tärnanskolan, Vänerskolan, Birger Sjöberg High School, Frida High School, as well as the independent school Fridaskolan.

== Sports ==
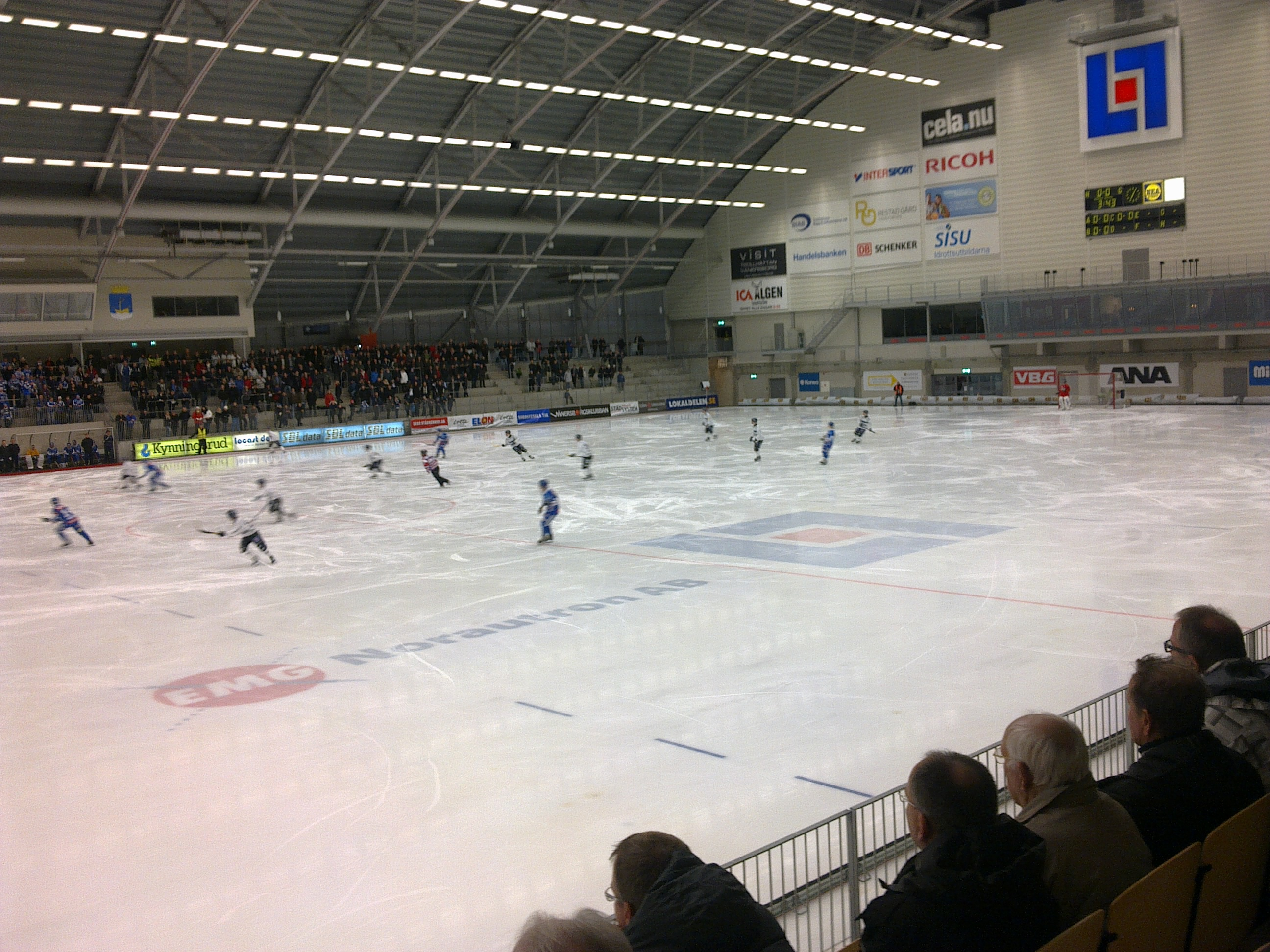
Arena Vänersborg

The bandy club IFK Vänersborg plays in the highest division Elitserien and Blåsuts BK is usually playing in the second-tier Allsvenskan. Arena Vänersborg is an indoor arenas for bandy. Arena Vänersborg caused a great commotion, due to it exceeding its budget, landing the final cost of the arena at 300 000 000 SEK and counting.

Vänersborg hosted the 2013 Bandy World Championship for men's teams. For the second time Group A was a separate event. When the world championship will be held in town again, in 2019, it will be for both divisions.

== Districts ==
Vänersborg is made out of several small and large districts: Onsjö, Mariedal, Blåsut, Vargön, Lilleskog, Korseberg, Torpa, Nordstan, Restad and Öxnered.

== Politics ==
On 22 November 2010, Vänersborg's Mayor, Lars-Göran Ljunggren (Social Democrat), resigned following two scandals of Arena Vänersborg, whose costs greatly exceeded the original budget, and the Toppfrys deal, which was investigated by the European Union Economic Commission. Ljunggren had spent 30 years on Vänersborg City Council, and three and a half years as mayor. He was succeeded in 2011 by the Conservative politician Gunnar Lidell. Mayor since the election 2014 is Marie Dahlin, Social Democrat.

== Nature ==
Ecopark Halle and Hunneberg is a recreational area in the vicinity of Vänersborg. It is a tourist destination in the area.

== Notable inhabitants ==
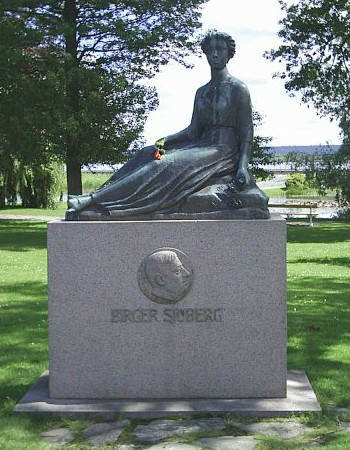
Birger Sjöberg

Count Lennart Torstensson (1603–1651), was born at Forstena manor in Vänersborg, Västergötland. He was a Swedish Field Marshal and military engineer.

The poet Birger Sjöberg (1885–1929) was born in Vänersborg. He wrote appreciatively about Vänersborg, most notably in Fridas bok (1922), wherein the comparison "Vänersborg – little Paris" is found. The park in the northern part of Vänersborg, Skräckleparken, offers a view over lake Vänern, and therein also stands this statue of mentioned Ragnar.

The prominent Swedish explorer and trader Axel Eriksson (1846–1901) was also born in Vänersborg. The Municipal Museum displays a collection of birds from south-western Africa that were collected by Eriksson.

The band Junip including José González is partially from, and formed in, Vänersborg; punk rock band Division of Laura Lee is also from the city. Swedish singer Agnes Carlsson was born in Vänersborg, as was Grammy-winning hip-hop producer Tommy Black.

The Olympian Björn Johannson grew up and started competing in Vänersborg.

== See also ==
- Torstenson War
