= DBAR problem =

The DBAR problem, or the $\bar{\partial}$-problem, is the problem of solving the differential equation
$$\bar{\partial} f (z, \bar{z}) = g(z)$$
for the function $f(z,\bar{z})$, where $g(z)$ is assumed to be known and $z = x + iy$ is a complex number in a domain $R\subseteq \Complex$. The operator $\bar{\partial}$ is called the DBAR operator:
$$\bar{\partial} = \frac{1}{2} \left(\frac{\partial}{\partial x} + i \frac{\partial}{\partial y} \right)$$
The DBAR operator is nothing other than the complex conjugate of the operator
$$\partial=\frac{\partial}{\partial z} = \frac{1}{2} \left(\frac{\partial}{\partial x} - i \frac{\partial}{\partial y} \right)$$
denoting the usual differentiation in the complex $z$-plane.

The DBAR problem is of key importance in the theory of integrable systems, Schrödinger operators and (together with a jump condition) generalizes the Riemann–Hilbert problem.
