= Brätte =

Coordinates: 58°20′45″N 12°18′16″E

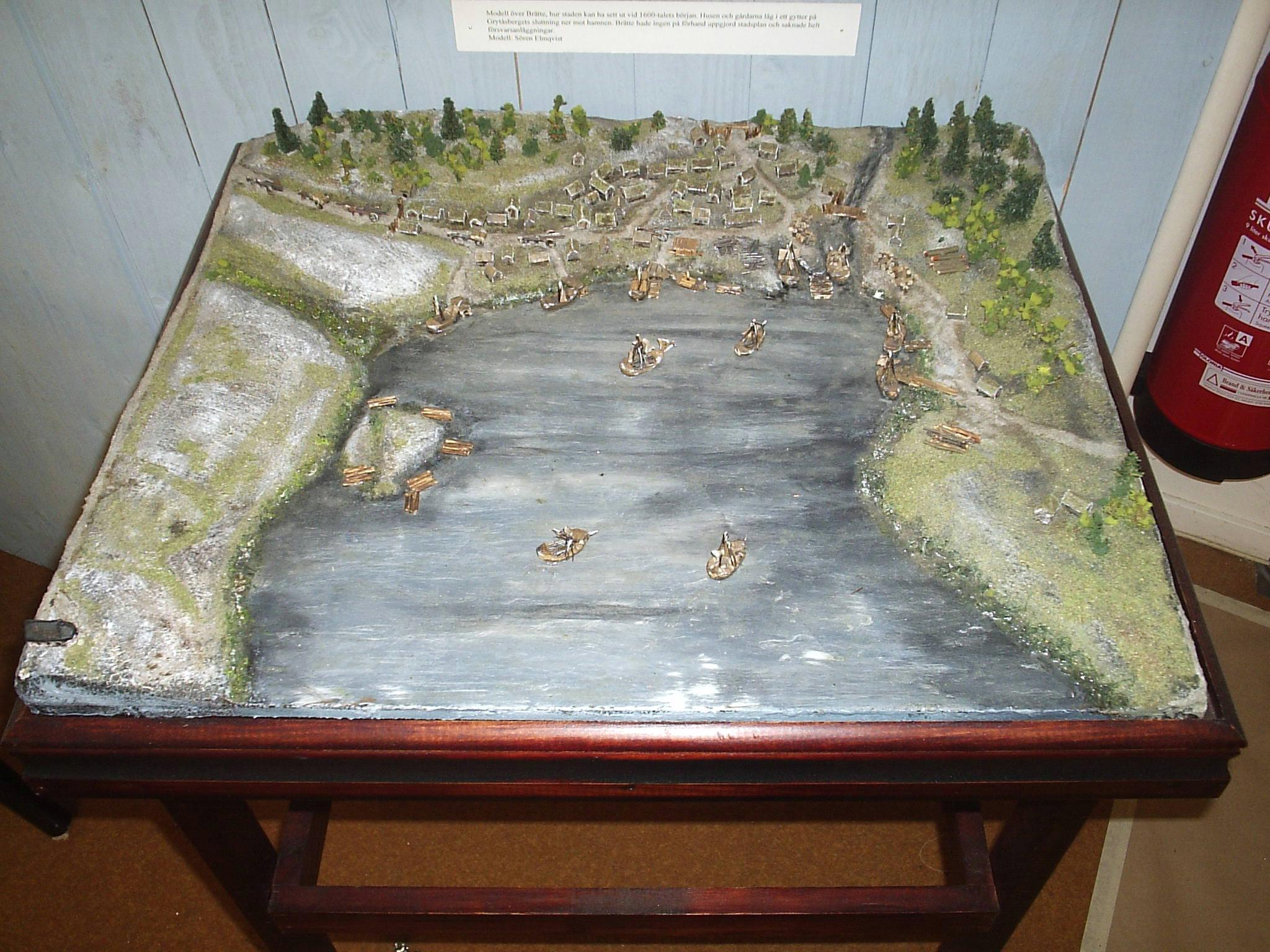
Model of Brätte, showing how the city may have looked in the early 17th century

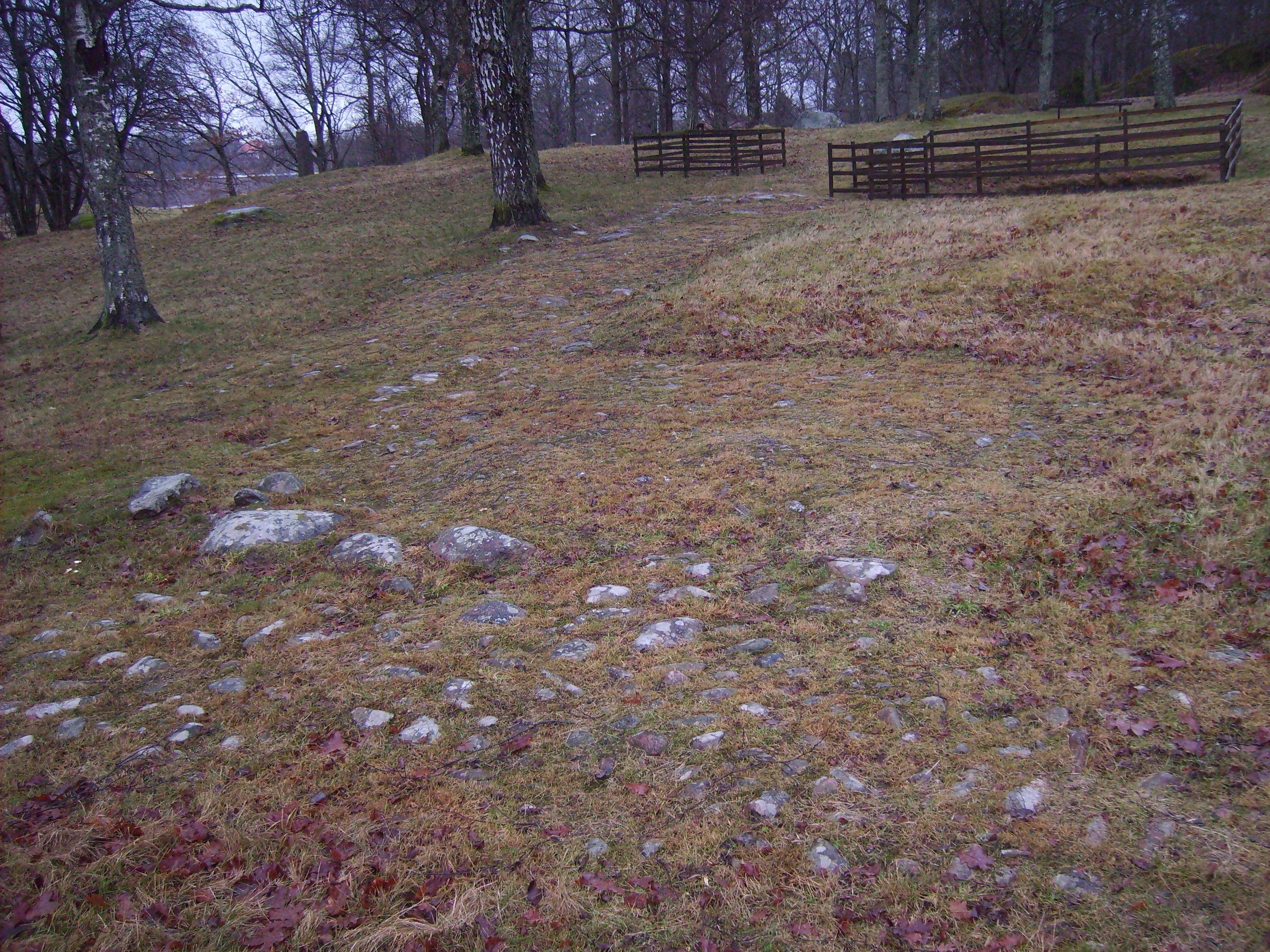
Remnants of Brätte

Brätte, originally known as Vassända, was a settlement on Vänern's southernmost bay, now Lake Vassbotten; it was a predecessor of today's Vänersborg, Sweden.

== Origins ==
It is unclear when Brätte was founded, but it was a commercial center in the early 1500s. The name Brätte was first mentioned in 1556. Its site was important because the rapids and waterfalls on the Göta Älv at Rånnum (current Vargön) and Trollhättan barred navigation to shipping on Vänern and obliged traders to unload their cargoes here for portage on the Edsvägen. In addition, roads connected to the then Norwegian Bohuslän, Skara and Dalsland.

Sometime between 1580 and 1586 Brätte was granted town privileges. Brätte became its own parish around 1600, but had become part of Vänersborg parish by 1644.

During the Kalmar War (1611–1613), Nya Lödöse was taken by the Danes and some of its population moved to nearby market towns, principally Brätte, whose population increased from 200 to 450. While Nya Lödöse was Danish, Brätte became Sweden's only place of shipment to the west until 1619 when Sweden regained its lost areas in Älvsborg's second strike.

== Decline ==
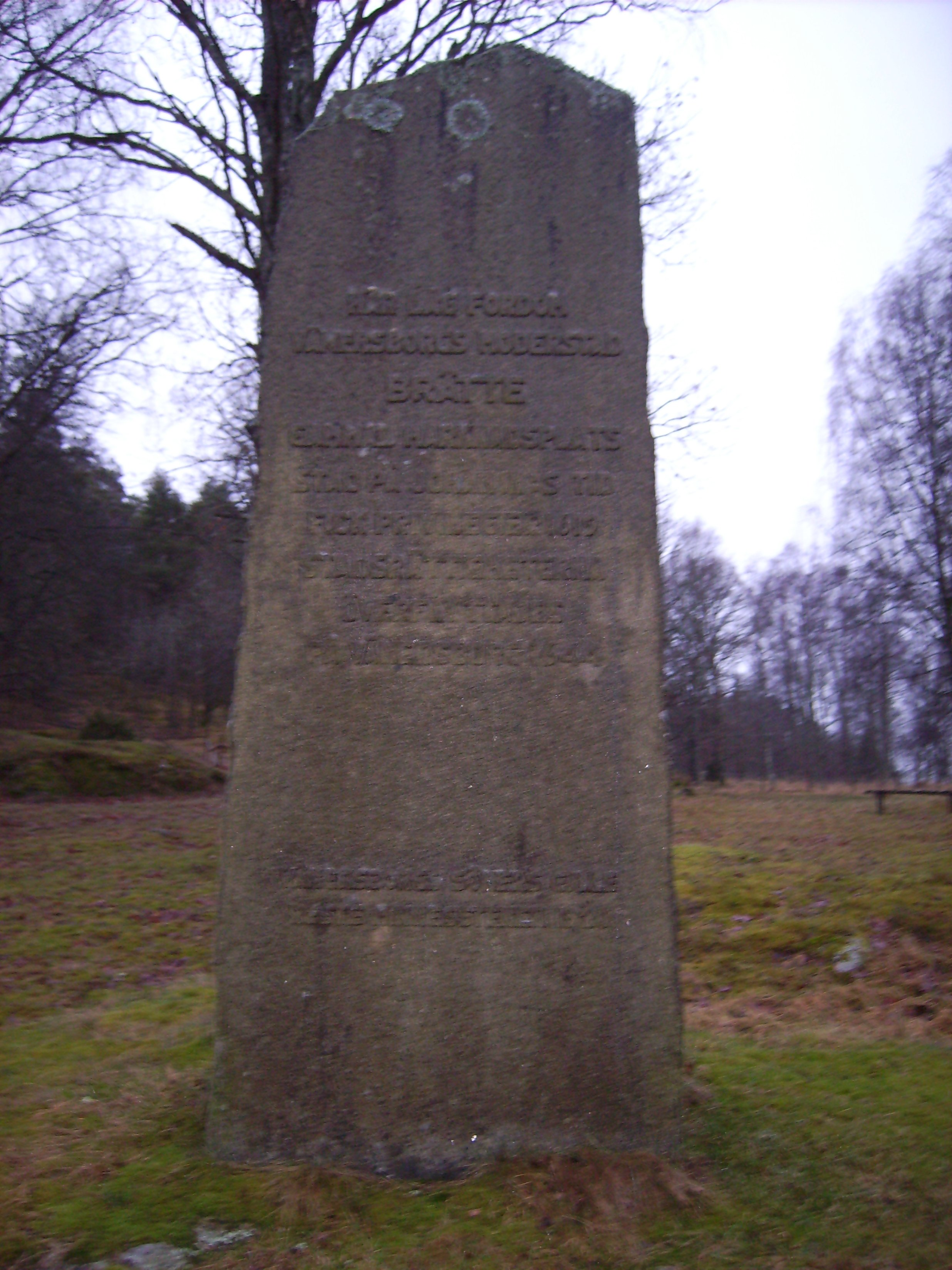
Memorial stone over Brätte

Brätte could not survive because militarily it occupied a poor location and the natural separation of Lake Vassbotten from the rest of Vänern prevented ships from reaching Brätte. There had already been attempts to move the town, both by Gustav Vasa in 1560 and by Eric XIV a few years later. The next attempt was made by Charles IX in 1610 after a fire destroyed six of the town's 22 houses. The intended location was privately owned, however, but in 1641 an agreement enabled the acquisition of the estate. Brätte's residents were now able to establish their new city and on February 1, 1644, Queen Christina granted regency privileges for Vänersborg. The last inhabitants left Brätte in 1647.

== Excavations ==
Archaeological excavations were made in 1918 and 1943 and the remains of the city are now visible. Many of the finds can be seen in the Vänersborg Museum, where a model (by Sören Elmqvist) depicts Brätte as it was in the early 1600s.
