= Peyk, Markazi =

Village in Markazi province, Iran

Peyk Persian: پيك
- Village
- Location within Iran
- Coordinates: 35°20′18″N 50°44′56″E
- Country: Iran
- Province: Markazi
- County: Zarandiyeh
- District: Central
- Rural District: Rudshur

Population (2016)
  - Total: 67
- Time zone: UTC+3:30 (IRST)

Peyk (Persian: پيك) (Note: Also romanized as Peik and Pīk) is a village in Rudshur Rural District of the Central District in Zarandiyeh County, Markazi province, Iran.

== Demographics ==
=== Population ===
At the time of the 2006 National Census, the village's population was 214 in 61 households. The following census in 2011 counted 124 people in 21 households. The 2016 census measured the population of the village as 67 people in 22 households.
