= Payment in kind =

Payment in kind may refer to:

- Barter, exchange of goods or services for other goods or services
- Payment in kind loan, or PIK loan, a type of high-risk loan or bond
