= Quri Chay-ye Sharqi Rural District =

Rural district in Iran

Quri Chay-ye Sharqi Rural District Persian: دهستان قورئ چائ شرقي
- Rural District
- Location within Iran
- Coordinates: 37°08′N 46°46′E
- Country: Iran
- Province: East Azerbaijan
- County: Charuymaq
- District: Central
- Established: 1987
- Capital: Agh Ziarat

Population (2016)
  - Total: 2,176
- Time zone: UTC+3:30 (IRST)

Quri Chay-ye Sharqi Rural District (Persian: دهستان قورئ چائ شرقي) is in the Central District of Charuymaq County, East Azerbaijan province, Iran. Its capital is the village of Agh Ziarat.

== Demographics ==
=== Population ===
At the time of the 2006 National Census, the rural district's population was 2,631 in 520 households. There were 2,457 inhabitants in 667 households at the following census of 2011. The 2016 census measured the population of the rural district as 2,176 in 691 households. The most populous of its 22 villages was Agh Ziarat, with 317 people.

=== Other villages in the rural district ===
- Chopoqlu
- Soltanabad-e Agh Ziarat
