= Varqeh Rural District =

Rural district in East Azerbaijan province, Iran

Varqeh Rural District Persian: دهستان ورقه
- Rural District
- Location within Iran
- Coordinates: 37°16′N 47°02′E
- Country: Iran
- Province: East Azerbaijan
- County: Charuymaq
- District: Central
- Established: 1987
- Capital: Soltanabad

Population (2016)
  - Total: 2,736
- Time zone: UTC+3:30 (IRST)

Varqeh Rural District (Persian: دهستان ورقه) is in the Central District of Charuymaq County, East Azerbaijan province, Iran. Its capital is the village of Soltanabad.

== Demographics ==
=== Population ===
At the time of the 2006 National Census, the rural district's population was 3,546 in 689 households. There were 2,922 inhabitants in 807 households at the following census of 2011. The 2016 census measured the population of the rural district as 2,736 in 827 households. The most populous of its 32 villages was Imeshjeh, with 331 people.

=== Other villages in the rural district ===
- Hoseyni-ye Olya
- Khvajeh Shahi
- Shur-e Qarah Kand
- Varqeh-ye Olya
