= Charuymaq-e Jonubegharbi Rural District =

Rural district in East Azerbaijan province, Iran

Charuymaq-e Jonubegharbi Rural District Persian: دهستان چاراويماق جنوب غربي
- Rural District
- Location within Iran
- Coordinates: 36°54′N 46°57′E
- Country: Iran
- Province: East Azerbaijan
- County: Charuymaq
- District: Central
- Established: 1987
- Capital: Araskonay-e Sofla

Population (2016)
  - Total: 3,496
- Time zone: UTC+3:30 (IRST)

Charuymaq-e Jonubegharbi Rural District (Persian: دهستان چاراويماق جنوب غربي) is in the Central District of Charuymaq County, East Azerbaijan province, Iran. Its capital is the village of Araskonay-e Sofla.

== Demographics ==
=== Population ===
At the time of the 2006 National Census, the rural district's population was 4,358 in 783 households. There were 3,881 inhabitants in 1,028 households at the following census of 2011. The 2016 census measured the population of the rural district as 3,496 in 1,048 households. The most populous of its 38 villages was Gowijeh Qaleh, with 534 people.

=== Other villages in the rural district ===
- Ab-e Garm
- Goli
- Viran Qayah
