= Charuymaq-e Markazi Rural District =

Rural district in East Azerbaijan province, Iran

Charuymaq-e Markazi Rural District Persian: دهستان چاراويماق مركزئ
- Rural District
- Location within Iran
- Coordinates: 37°10′N 46°59′E
- Country: Iran
- Province: East Azerbaijan
- County: Charuymaq
- District: Central
- Established: 1987
- Capital: Qarah Aghaj

Population (2016)
  - Total: 5,194
- Time zone: UTC+3:30 (IRST)

Charuymaq-e Markazi Rural District (Persian: دهستان چاراويماق مركزئ) is in the Central District of Charuymaq County, East Azerbaijan province, Iran. It is administered from the city of Qarah Aghaj.

== Demographics ==
=== Population ===
At the time of the 2006 National Census, the rural district's population was 6,444 in 1,266 households. There were 5,429 inhabitants in 1,511 households at the following census of 2011. The 2016 census measured the population of the rural district as 5,194 in 1,574 households. The most populous of its 53 villages was Owch Daraq, with 420 people.

=== Other villages in the rural district ===
- Chuganlu
- Dabardan-e Sofla
- Khadem Kandi
- Khorram Daraq
- Peyk
