= Central District (Charuymaq County) =

District in East Azerbaijan province, Iran

Central District (Charuymaq County) Persian: بخش مرکزی شهرستان چاراویماق
- District
- Location within Iran
- Coordinates: 37°03′N 46°54′E
- Country: Iran
- Province: East Azerbaijan
- County: Charuymaq
- Established: 2000
- Capital: Qarah Aghaj

Population (2016)
  - Total: 19,704
- Time zone: UTC+3:30 (IRST)

The Central District of Charuymaq County (Persian: بخش مرکزی شهرستان چاراویماق) is in East Azerbaijan province, Iran. Its capital is the city of Qarah Aghaj.

== Demographics ==
=== Population ===
At the time of the 2006 National Census, the district's population was 21,136 in 4,194 households. The following census in 2011 counted 20,341 people in 5,359 households. The 2016 census measured the population of the district as 19,704 inhabitants in 5,802 households.

=== Administrative divisions ===
Central District (Charuymaq County) Population
Administrative Divisions	2006	2011	2016
Charuymaq-e Jonubegharbi RD	4,358	3,881	3,496
Charuymaq-e Markazi RD	6,444	5,429	5,194
Quri Chay-ye Sharqi RD	2,631	2,457	2,176
Varqeh RD	3,546	2,922	2,736
Qarah Aghaj (city)	4,157	5,652	6,102
Total	21,136	20,341	19,704
RD = Rural District
