= Charuymaq County =

County in East Azerbaijan province, Iran

Charuymaq County Persian: شهرستان چاراویماق
- County
- Location of Charuymaq County in East Azerbaijan province (bottom center, green)

- Location of East Azerbaijan province in Iran
- Coordinates: 37°03′N 47°10′E
- Country: Iran
- Province: East Azerbaijan
- Established: 2000
- Capital: Qarah Aghaj
- Districts: Central, Shadian

Population (2016)
  - Total: 31,071
- Time zone: UTC+3:30 (IRST)
- Website: charoymagh.ir

Charuymaq County (Persian: شهرستان چاراویماق) is in East Azerbaijan province, Iran. Its capital is the city of Qarah Aghaj.

== Etymology ==
According to Vladimir Minorsky, the name Chār-oymāq means "the four tribes" (from the Mongolian word aymaq, meaning "tribe"). Until the mid-20th century, the Charuymaq District was known as Oryād or Uryād, after the Oirats, a Mongol tribe. According to the Ālam-ārā, a tribe known as Uryād historically lived among (but was separate from) the Mukri Kurds.

== Demographics ==
=== Population ===
At the time of the 2006 National Census, the county's population was 33,921 in 6,396 households. The following census in 2011 counted 32,745 people in 8,202 households. The 2016 census measured the population of the county as 31,071 in 9,016 households.

=== Administrative divisions ===
Charuymaq County's population history and administrative structure over three consecutive censuses are shown in the following table.

Charuymaq County Population
Administrative Divisions	2006	2011	2016
Central District	21,136	20,341	19,704
Charuymaq-e Jonubegharbi RD	4,358	3,881	3,496
Charuymaq-e Markazi RD	6,444	5,429	5,194
Quri Chay-ye Sharqi RD	2,631	2,457	2,176
Varqeh RD	3,546	2,922	2,736
Qarah Aghaj (city)	4,157	5,652	6,102
Shadian District	12,785	12,404	11,367
Charuymaq-e Jonubesharqi RD	5,155	4,961	4,428
Charuymaq-e Sharqi RD	7,630	7,443	6,939
Total	33,921	32,745	31,071
RD = Rural District

== See also ==
Media related to Charuymaq County at Wikimedia Commons
