= Anjuman =

Anjum, Anjom, Anjuman or Anjoman, meaning a gathering or society, may refer to:

== Organisations ==
- Anjoman-e Okhovat, a Freemason-like mystical society rooted in Sufism in Iran
- Anjuman-i-Himayat-i-Islam, an Islamic intellectual and political organisation based in Lahore, Pakistan
- Anjuman-i-Ulama-i-Bangala, defunct Islamic organisation based in British Bengal
- Anjuman Khudam-ul-Quran, a Muslim educational organisation on the Indian subcontinent
- Anjuman (Parsis), the Parsi–Zoroastrian associations that have the authority to manage a Tower of Silence in India
- Anjuman Sunnat-ul-Jamaat Association, a Muslim organisation of Trinidad and Tobago
- Anjuman Taraqqi-i-Urdu, an organisation for the promotion of Urdu language, Urdu literature and Indian Muslim cultural heritage
- Anjuvannam, a medieval merchant guild of West Asian traders (Jews, Syrian Christians, and Muslims) in south India and South East Asia
- Deendar Anjuman, an Islamic organization based in Hyderabad, India
- Aḥmadiyyah Anjuman-i Ishāʿat-i Islām Lahore, a branch, sect, or faction of the Ahmadiyyah Movement that emerged after a schismatic split occurred around 1914

== People ==
- Anjuman (actress) (born 1955), Pakistani actress
- Nadia Anjuman (1980–2005), Afghan poet and journalist
- Anjuman Shehzadi (1977–2011), Pakistani stage and film actress

== Places ==
- Anjuman Pass in Afghanistan
- Anjuman Valley in Afghanistan
- Anjuman (stream), through that valley
- Anjuman, Afghanistan, a village in Afghanistan
- Anjuman-i-Khurd, another village in Afghanistan
- Anjoman, Iran, a village in Kohgiluyeh and Boyer-Ahmad Province, Iran
- Anjoman-e Olya, a village in Zanjan Province, Iran
- Anjoman-e Sofla, a village in Zanjan Province, Iran

== Films ==
- Anjuman (1970 film), a 1970 Pakistani Urdu film starring Waheed Murad and Rani
- Anjuman (2013 film), a 2013 Pakistani Urdu film starring Imran Abbas Naqvi and Sara Loren
- Anjuman (1986 film), a Hindi film directed by Muzaffar Ali starring Shabana Azmi and Farooq Shaikh
- Anjuman (1948 film), a Hindi film directed by Akhtar Hussain and starring Nargis and P. Jairaj
