= Baghlujeh =

Baghlujeh or Baghlujeh or Baghloojeh (Persian: باغلوجه), also rendered as Bagludzhakh, may refer to various places in Iran:

- Baghlujeh, East Azerbaijan
- Baghlujeh, Qorveh, Kurdistan Province
- Baghlujeh, Saqqez, Kurdistan Province
- Baghlujeh, West Azerbaijan
- Baghlujeh, Zanjan
- Baghlujeh-ye Aqa, Zanjan Province
- Baghlujeh Bayat, Zanjan Province
- Baghlujeh-ye Sardar, Zanjan Province
