= Sar Cham =

Sar Cham or Sarcham (Persian: سرچم) may refer to:

- Sar Cham, Ilam
- Sarcham-e Deh Harun, Ilam Province
- Sar Cham, Kurdistan
- Sarcham-e Olya, Zanjan Province
- Sarcham-e Sofla, Zanjan Province
