= Taqi Kandi =

Taqi Kandi (Persian: تقي كندي) may refer to:

- Taqi Kandi, Ardabil
- Taqi Kandi, Parsabad, Ardabil Province
- Taqi Kandi, East Azerbaijan
- Taqi Kandi, West Azerbaijan
- Taqi Kandi, Zanjan
