= Sari Kand =

Sari Kand (Persian: ساري كند) may refer to:

- Sari Kand-e Dadash Beyk
- Sari Kand-e Kabali
- Sari Kand-e Olya
