= Shokurchi =

Village in Zanjan province, Iran

Shokurchi Persian: شكورچي
- Village
- Location within Iran
- Coordinates: 37°00′38″N 47°43′39″E
- Country: Iran
- Province: Zanjan
- County: Zanjan
- District: Zanjanrud
- Rural District: Chaypareh-ye Pain

Population (2016)
  - Total: 113
- Time zone: UTC+3:30 (IRST)

Shokurchi (Persian: شكورچي) (Note: Also romanized as Shokūrchī; also known as Shokorchī) is a village in Chaypareh-ye Pain Rural District of Zanjanrud District in Zanjan County, Zanjan province, Iran.

== Demographics ==
=== Population ===
At the time of the 2006 National Census, the village's population was 251 in 59 households. The following census in 2011 counted 191 people in 56 households. The 2016 census measured the population of the village as 113 people in 35 households.
