= Chavor =

Village in Zanjan province, Iran

Chavor Persian: چاور
- Village
- Location within Iran
- Coordinates: 36°56′30″N 48°04′10″E
- Country: Iran
- Province: Zanjan
- County: Zanjan
- District: Zanjanrud
- Rural District: Zanjanrud-e Pain

Population (2016)
  - Total: 0
- Time zone: UTC+3:30 (IRST)

Chavor (Persian: چاور) (Note: Also romanized as Chāvor; also known as Chāveh, Chīr, Chūvīr, Chuwir, and Jāvor) is a village in Zanjanrud-e Pain Rural District of Zanjanrud District in Zanjan County, Zanjan province, Iran.

== Demographics ==
=== Population ===
At the time of the 2006 National Census, the village's population was 16 in five households. The following census in 2011 counted 17 people in four households. The 2016 census measured the population of the village as zero.
