= Qarah Aghaj-e Olya, Zanjan =

Village in Zanjan province, Iran

Qarah Aghaj-e Olya Persian: قره‌آغاج علیا
- Village
- Location within Iran
- Coordinates: 36°57′11″N 47°29′01″E
- Country: Iran
- Province: Zanjan
- County: Zanjan
- District: Zanjanrud
- Rural District: Chaypareh-ye Pain

Population (2016)
  - Total: 260
- Time zone: UTC+3:30 (IRST)

Qarah Aghaj-e Olya (Persian: قره‌آغاج علیا) (Note: Also romanized as Qarah Āghāj-e ‘Olyā; also known as Qarah Āqāj-e ‘Olyā and Qareh Āqāj-e ‘Olyā) is a village in Chaypareh-ye Pain Rural District of Zanjanrud District in Zanjan County, Zanjan province, Iran.

== Demographics ==
=== Population ===
At the time of the 2006 National Census, the village's population was 327 in 62 households. The following census in 2011 counted 261 people in 59 households. The 2016 census measured the population of the village as 260 people in 66 households.
