= Rezaabad, Zanjan =

Village in Zanjan province, Iran

Rezaabad Persian: رضاآباد
- Village
- Location within Iran
- Coordinates: 36°52′25″N 47°48′05″E
- Country: Iran
- Province: Zanjan
- County: Zanjan
- District: Zanjanrud
- Rural District: Ghanibeyglu

Population (2016)
  - Total: 433
- Time zone: UTC+3:30 (IRST)

Rezaabad (Persian: رضاآباد) (Note: Also romanized as Reẕāābād and Rez̧āābād) is a village in Ghanibeyglu Rural District of Zanjanrud District in Zanjan County, Zanjan province, Iran.

== Demographics ==
=== Population ===
At the time of the 2006 National Census, the village's population was 543 in 125 households. The following census in 2011 counted 514 people in 156 households. The 2016 census measured the population of the village as 433 people in 137 households.

== Agriculture ==
The village is known as the "Green Jewel Zone," and the best quality is the variety of apples (Pippin apple, Golden apple, etc.) and other garden products with a qualitative export status.
