= Chap Chap =

Village in Zanjan province, Iran

Chap Chap Persian: چپ چپ
- Village
- Location within Iran
- Coordinates: 37°00′46″N 47°57′08″E
- Country: Iran
- Province: Zanjan
- County: Zanjan
- District: Zanjanrud
- Rural District: Zanjanrud-e Pain

Population (2016)
  - Total: 621
- Time zone: UTC+3:30 (IRST)

Chap Chap (Persian: چپ چپ) (Note: Also romanized as Chepchep and Chop Chop) is a village in Zanjanrud-e Pain Rural District of Zanjanrud District in Zanjan County, Zanjan province, Iran.

== Demographics ==
=== Population ===
At the time of the 2006 National Census, the village's population was 677 in 143 households. The following census in 2011 counted 710 people in 179 households. The 2016 census measured the population of the village as 621 people in 173 households.
