= Hesar, Zanjan =

Village in Zanjan province, Iran

Hesar Persian: حصار
- Village
- Location within Iran
- Coordinates: 36°59′27″N 47°43′07″E
- Country: Iran
- Province: Zanjan
- County: Zanjan
- District: Zanjanrud
- Rural District: Chaypareh-ye Pain

Population (2016)
  - Total: 551
- Time zone: UTC+3:30 (IRST)

Hesar (Persian: حصار) (Note: Also romanized as Ḩeşār; also known as Zanjānrūd) is a village in, and the capital of, Chaypareh-ye Pain Rural District in Zanjanrud District of Zanjan County, Zanjan province, Iran.

== Demographics ==
=== Population ===
At the time of the 2006 National Census, the village's population was 731 in 193 households. The following census in 2011 counted 651 people in 193 households. The 2016 census measured the population of the village as 551 people in 179 households.
