= Andabad =

Andabad or And Abad (Persian: انداباد) may refer to:

- Andabad-e Olya
- Andabad-e Sofla
