= Kazbar =

Village in Zanjan province, Iran

Kazbar Persian: كزبر
- Village
- Location within Iran
- Coordinates: 36°49′27″N 48°13′29″E
- Country: Iran
- Province: Zanjan
- County: Zanjan
- District: Zanjanrud
- Rural District: Zanjanrud-e Pain

Population (2016)
  - Total: 641
- Time zone: UTC+3:30 (IRST)

Kazbar (Persian: كزبر) (Note: Also known as Karzabar, Karzbar, Karzebar, Karzebū, Kazabar, and Kazzebar)) is a village in Zanjanrud-e Pain Rural District of Zanjanrud District in Zanjan County, Zanjan province, Iran.

== Demographics ==
=== Population ===
At the time of the 2006 National Census, the village's population was 662 in 172 households. The following census in 2011 counted 647 people in 217 households. The 2016 census measured the population of the village as 641 people in 217 households.
