= Hoseynabad, Zanjanrud =

Village in Zanjan province, Iran

Hoseynabad Persian: قزلجه عليا
- Village
- Location within Iran
- Coordinates: 36°46′03″N 47°52′45″E
- Country: Iran
- Province: Zanjan
- County: Zanjan
- District: Zanjanrud
- Rural District: Ghanibeyglu

Population (2016)
  - Total: 65
- Time zone: UTC+3:30 (IRST)

Hoseynabad (Persian: حسين اباد) (Note: Also romanized as Ḩoseynābād) is a village in Ghanibeyglu Rural District of Zanjanrud District in Zanjan County, Zanjan province, Iran.

== Demographics ==
=== Population ===
At the time of the 2006 National Census, the village's population was 136 in 35 households. The following census in 2011 counted 87 people in 24 households. The 2016 census measured the population of the village as 65 people in 20 households.
