= Malek Baghi, Zanjan =

Village in Zanjan province, Iran

Malek Baghi Persian: ملك باغي
- Village
- Location within Iran
- Coordinates: 36°43′53″N 47°50′55″E
- Country: Iran
- Province: Zanjan
- County: Zanjan
- District: Zanjanrud
- Rural District: Ghanibeyglu

Population (2016)
  - Total: 169
- Time zone: UTC+3:30 (IRST)

Malek Baghi (Persian: ملك باغي) (Note: Also romanized as Malek Bāghī) is a village in Ghanibeyglu Rural District of Zanjanrud District in Zanjan County, Zanjan province, Iran.

== Demographics ==
=== Population ===
At the time of the 2006 National Census, the village's population was 269 in 65 households. The following census in 2011 counted 202 people in 58 households. The 2016 census measured the population of the village as 169 people in 56 households.
