= Esfanaj =

Village in Zanjan province, Iran

Esfanaj Persian: اسفناج
- Village
- Location within Iran
- Coordinates: 36°48′57″N 48°10′51″E
- Country: Iran
- Province: Zanjan
- County: Zanjan
- District: Zanjanrud
- Rural District: Zanjanrud-e Pain

Population (2016)
  - Total: 239
- Time zone: UTC+3:30 (IRST)

Esfanaj (Persian: اسفناج) (Note: Also romanized as Esfanāj and Esfenāj; also known as Isfanaj and Ispanag) is a village in Zanjanrud-e Pain Rural District of Zanjanrud District in Zanjan County, Zanjan province, Iran.

== Demographics ==
=== Population ===
At the time of the 2006 National Census, the village's population was 426 in 104 households. The following census in 2011 counted 310 people in 99 households. The 2016 census measured the population of the village as 239 people in 90 households.
