= Qarachar =

Qarachar may refer to:

- Qarah Charyan, a village in Zanjan Province, Iran
- Qarah Char, a village in Kurdistan Province, Iran
- Qarachar Noyan, an ancestor of Timur
