= Nowruzabad, Zanjan =

Village in Zanjan province, Iran

Nowruzabad Persian: نوروزاباد
- Village
- Location within Iran
- Coordinates: 36°57′47″N 47°40′26″E
- Country: Iran
- Province: Zanjan
- County: Zanjan
- District: Zanjanrud
- Rural District: Chaypareh-ye Pain

Population (2016)
  - Total: 19
- Time zone: UTC+3:30 (IRST)

Nowruzabad (Persian: نوروزاباد) (Note: Also romanized as Nowrūzābād; also known as Qarah Hoseyni) is a village in Chaypareh-ye Pain Rural District of Zanjanrud District in Zanjan County, Zanjan province, Iran.

== Demographics ==
=== Population ===
At the time of the 2006 National Census, the village's population was 72 in 16 households. The population was below the reporting threshold at the following census in 2011. The 2016 census measured the population of the village as 19 people in five households.
