= Sardehat =

Sardehat (Persian: سر دهات), also rendered as Sardekhat, may refer to:

- Sardehat-e Bayat Jafar
- Sardehat-e Sheykh
