= Quli Qaseh =

Village in Zanjan province, Iran

Quli Qaseh Persian: قو لي قصه
- Village
- Location within Iran
- Coordinates: 37°04′45″N 47°56′15″E
- Country: Iran
- Province: Zanjan
- County: Zanjan
- District: Zanjanrud
- Rural District: Zanjanrud-e Pain

Population (2016)
  - Total: 628
- Time zone: UTC+3:30 (IRST)

Quli Qaseh (Persian: قو لي قصه) (Note: Also romanized as Qūlī Qaṣeh; also known as Solţānābād; formerly known as Zeylanabad (زیلن آباد)) is a village in Zanjanrud-e Pain Rural District of Zanjanrud District in Zanjan County, Zanjan province, Iran.

== Demographics ==
=== Population ===
At the time of the 2006 National Census, the village's population was 779 in 193 households. The following census in 2011 counted 680 people in 186 households. The 2016 census measured the population of the village as 628 people in 200 households.
