= Mian Darreh, Zanjan =

Village in Zanjan province, Iran

Mian Darreh Persian: مياندره
- Village
- Location within Iran
- Coordinates: 36°48′24″N 47°44′15″E
- Country: Iran
- Province: Zanjan
- County: Zanjan
- District: Zanjanrud
- Rural District: Ghanibeyglu

Population (2016)
  - Total: 46
- Time zone: UTC+3:30 (IRST)

Mian Darreh (Persian: مياندره) (Note: Also romanized as Mīān Darreh) is a village in Ghanibeyglu Rural District of Zanjanrud District in Zanjan County, Zanjan province, Iran.

== Demographics ==
=== Population ===
At the time of the 2006 National Census, the village's population was 116 in 24 households. The following census in 2011 counted 98 people in 22 households. The 2016 census measured the population of the village as 46 people in 13 households.
