= Habash, Zanjan =

Village in Zanjan province, Iran

Habash Persian: حبش
- Village
- Location within Iran
- Coordinates: 36°46′10″N 47°46′58″E
- Country: Iran
- Province: Zanjan
- County: Zanjan
- District: Zanjanrud
- Rural District: Ghanibeyglu

Population (2016)
  - Total: 82
- Time zone: UTC+3:30 (IRST)

Habash (Persian: حبش) (Note: Also romanized as Ḩabash) is a village in Ghanibeyglu Rural District of Zanjanrud District in Zanjan County, Zanjan province, Iran.

== Demographics ==
=== Population ===
At the time of the 2006 National Census, the village's population was 200 in 51 households. The following census in 2011 counted 109 people in 26 households. The 2016 census measured the population of the village as 82 people in 23 households.
