= Hamzehlu =

Village in Zanjan province, Iran

Hamzehlu Persian: حمزه لو
- Village
- Location within Iran
- Coordinates: 36°55′04″N 47°51′17″E
- Country: Iran
- Province: Zanjan
- County: Zanjan
- District: Zanjanrud
- Rural District: Ghanibeyglu

Population (2016)
  - Total: 19
- Time zone: UTC+3:30 (IRST)

Hamzehlu (Persian: حمزه لو) (Note: Also romanized as Ḩamzehlū; also known as Khomrehlī and Saqātūtān) is a village in Ghanibeyglu Rural District of Zanjanrud District in Zanjan County, Zanjan province, Iran.

== Demographics ==
=== Population ===
At the time of the 2006 National Census, the village's population was 29 in nine households. The following census in 2011 counted 27 people in six households. The 2016 census measured the population of the village as 19 people in six households.
