= Dulak =

Village in Zanjan province, Iran

Dulak Persian: دولك
- Village
- Location within Iran
- Coordinates: 37°03′00″N 48°09′04″E
- Country: Iran
- Province: Zanjan
- County: Zanjan
- District: Zanjanrud
- Rural District: Zanjanrud-e Pain

Population (2016)
  - Total: 9
- Time zone: UTC+3:30 (IRST)

Dulak (Persian: دولك) (Note: Also romanized as Dūlak) is a village in Zanjanrud-e Pain Rural District of Zanjanrud District in Zanjan County, Zanjan province, Iran.

== Demographics ==
=== Population ===
At the time of the 2006 National Census, the village's population was 68 in 18 households. The following census in 2011 counted 49 people in 19 households. The 2016 census measured the population of the village as nine people in five households.
