= Zangin =

Village in Zanjan province, Iran

Zangin Persian: زنگين
- Village
- Location within Iran
- Coordinates: 36°40′45″N 47°54′36″E
- Country: Iran
- Province: Zanjan
- County: Zanjan
- District: Zanjanrud
- Rural District: Ghanibeyglu

Population (2016)
  - Total: 113
- Time zone: UTC+3:30 (IRST)

Zangin (Persian: زنگين) (Note: Also romanized as Zangīn) is a village in Ghanibeyglu Rural District of Zanjanrud District in Zanjan County, Zanjan province, Iran.

== Demographics ==
=== Population ===
At the time of the 2006 National Census, the village's population was 234 in 45 households. The following census in 2011 counted 194 people in 46 households. The 2016 census measured the population of the village as 113 people in 29 households.
