= Kangarlu, Zanjan =

Village in Zanjan province, Iran

Kangarlu Persian: كنگرلو
- Village
- Location within Iran
- Coordinates: 36°51′06″N 47°43′06″E
- Country: Iran
- Province: Zanjan
- County: Zanjan
- District: Zanjanrud
- Rural District: Ghanibeyglu

Population (2016)
  - Total: 0
- Time zone: UTC+3:30 (IRST)

Kangarlu (Persian: كنگرلو) (Note: Also romanized as Kangarlū) is a village in Ghanibeyglu Rural District of Zanjanrud District in Zanjan County, Zanjan province, Iran.

== Demographics ==
=== Population ===
At the time of the 2006 National Census, the village's population was 198 in 38 households. The village did not appear in the following census of 2011. The 2016 census measured the population of the village as zero.
