= Tazeh Kand, Zanjan =

Village in Zanjan province, Iran

Tazeh Kand Persian: تازه كند
- Village
- Location within Iran
- Coordinates: 37°04′04″N 47°58′18″E
- Country: Iran
- Province: Zanjan
- County: Zanjan
- District: Zanjanrud
- Rural District: Zanjanrud-e Pain

Population (2016)
  - Total: 17
- Time zone: UTC+3:30 (IRST)

Tazeh Kand (Persian: تازه كند) (Note: Also romanized as Tāzeh Kand) is a village in Zanjanrud-e Pain Rural District of Zanjanrud District in Zanjan County, Zanjan province, Iran.

== Demographics ==
=== Population ===
At the time of the 2006 National Census, the village's population was 23 in six households. The following census in 2011 counted 20 people in six households. The 2016 census measured the population of the village as 17 people in six households.
