= Lulekabad =

Village in Zanjan province, Iran

Lulekabad Persian: لولك اباد
- Village
- Location within Iran
- Coordinates: 36°44′42″N 47°51′44″E
- Country: Iran
- Province: Zanjan
- County: Zanjan
- District: Zanjanrud
- Rural District: Ghanibeyglu

Population (2016)
  - Total: 147
- Time zone: UTC+3:30 (IRST)

Lulekabad (Persian: لولك اباد) (Note: Also romanized as Lūlakābād and Lūlekābād) is a village in Ghanibeyglu Rural District of Zanjanrud District in Zanjan County, Zanjan province, Iran.

== Demographics ==
=== Population ===
At the time of the 2006 National Census, the village's population was 198 in 55 households. The following census in 2011 counted 195 people in 55 households. The 2016 census measured the population of the village as 147 people in 47 households.
