= Qareh Aghaj, Zanjan =

Village in Zanjan province, Iran

Qareh Aghaj Persian: قره‌آغاج
- Village
- Location within Iran
- Coordinates: 36°46′11″N 48°05′47″E
- Country: Iran
- Province: Zanjan
- County: Zanjan
- District: Zanjanrud
- Rural District: Zanjanrud-e Pain

Population (2016)
  - Total: 234
- Time zone: UTC+3:30 (IRST)

Qareh Aghaj (Persian: قره‌آغاج) (Note: Also romanized as Qareh Āghāj; also known as Kara-Agach, Qara Aghach, Qarah Āqāj, Qareh Āqāch, and Qareh Āqāj) is a village in Zanjanrud-e Pain Rural District of Zanjanrud District in Zanjan County, Zanjan province, Iran.

== Demographics ==
=== Population ===
At the time of the 2006 National Census, the village's population was 384 in 99 households. The following census in 2011 counted 268 people in 81 households. The 2016 census measured the population of the village as 234 people in 75 households.
