= Nasirabad, Zanjan =

Village in Zanjan province, Iran

Nasirabad Persian: نصيراباد
- Village
- Location within Iran
- Coordinates: 36°45′29″N 47°55′51″E
- Country: Iran
- Province: Zanjan
- County: Zanjan
- District: Zanjanrud
- Rural District: Ghanibeyglu

Population (2016)
  - Total: 470
- Time zone: UTC+3:30 (IRST)

Nasirabad (Persian: نصيراباد) (Note: Also romanized as Naşīrābād; also known as Naşrābād-e Torpākhlū) is a village in Ghanibeyglu Rural District of Zanjanrud District in Zanjan County, Zanjan province, Iran.

== Demographics ==
=== Population ===
At the time of the 2006 National Census, the village's population was 698 in 164 households. The following census in 2011 counted 680 people in 173 households. The 2016 census measured the population of the village as 470 people in 124 households.
