= Alvarlu =

Village in Zanjan province, Iran

Alvarlu Persian: الوارلو
- Village
- Location within Iran
- Coordinates: 37°07′10″N 47°50′39″E
- Country: Iran
- Province: Zanjan
- County: Zanjan
- District: Zanjanrud
- Rural District: Zanjanrud-e Pain

Population (2016)
  - Total: 47
- Time zone: UTC+3:30 (IRST)

Alvarlu (Persian: الوارلو) (Note: Also romanized as Alvārlū and Ālvārlū; also known as Alwari and Gūzī Raj‘īn) is a village in Zanjanrud-e Pain Rural District of Zanjanrud District in Zanjan County, Zanjan province, Iran.

== Demographics ==
=== Population ===
At the time of the 2006 National Census, the village's population was 123 in 21 households. The following census in 2011 counted 69 people in 16 households. The 2016 census measured the population of the village as 47 people in 11 households.
