= Sari Kand-e Dadash Beyk =

Village in Zanjan province, Iran

Sari Kand-e Dadash Beyk Persian: ساري كندداداش بيك
- Village
- Country: Iran
- Province: Zanjan
- County: Zanjan
- District: Zanjanrud
- Rural District: Chaypareh-ye Pain

Population (2006)
  - Total: 116
- Time zone: UTC+3:30 (IRST)

Sari Kand-e Dadash Beyk (Persian: ساري كندداداش بيك) (Note: Also romanized as Sārī Kand-e Dādāsh Beyk) is a village in Chaypareh-ye Pain Rural District of Zanjanrud District in Zanjan County, Zanjan province, Iran.

== Demographics ==
=== Population ===
At the time of the 2006 National Census, the village's population was 116 in 23 households. The village did not appear in the following censuses of 2011 and 2016.
