= Mehrabad, Zanjan =

Village in Zanjan province, Iran

Mehrabad Persian: مهراباد
- Village
- Location within Iran
- Coordinates: 36°53′40″N 47°55′43″E
- Country: Iran
- Province: Zanjan
- County: Zanjan
- District: Zanjanrud
- Rural District: Ghanibeyglu

Population (2016)
  - Total: 416
- Time zone: UTC+3:30 (IRST)

Mehrabad (Persian: مهراباد) (Note: Also romanized as Mehrābād) is a village in Ghanibeyglu Rural District of Zanjanrud District in Zanjan County, Zanjan province, Iran.

== Demographics ==
=== Population ===
At the time of the 2006 National Census, the village's population was 728 in 194 households. The following census in 2011 counted 650 people in 185 households. The 2016 census measured the population of the village as 416 people in 147 households.
