= Sangabin =

Village in Zanjan province, Iran

Sangabin Persian: سنگبين
- Village
- Location within Iran
- Coordinates: 36°46′33″N 47°53′32″E
- Country: Iran
- Province: Zanjan
- County: Zanjan
- District: Zanjanrud
- Rural District: Ghanibeyglu

Population (2016)
  - Total: 61
- Time zone: UTC+3:30 (IRST)

Sangabin (Persian: سنگبين) (Note: Also romanized as Sangabīn) is a village in Ghanibeyglu Rural District of Zanjanrud District in Zanjan County, Zanjan province, Iran.

== Demographics ==
=== Population ===
At the time of the 2006 National Census, the village's population was 94 in 23 households. The following census in 2011 counted 64 people in 16 households. The 2016 census measured the population of the village as 61 people in 18 households.
