= Talkhab, Zanjanrud =

Village in Zanjan province, Iran

Talkhab Persian: تلخاب
- Village
- Location within Iran
- Coordinates: 36°45′07″N 48°05′47″E
- Country: Iran
- Province: Zanjan
- County: Zanjan
- District: Zanjanrud
- Rural District: Zanjanrud-e Pain

Population (2016)
  - Total: 295
- Time zone: UTC+3:30 (IRST)

Talkhab (Persian: تلخاب) (Note: Also romanized as Talkhāb) is a village in Zanjanrud-e Pain Rural District of Zanjanrud District in Zanjan County, Zanjan province, Iran.

== Demographics ==
=== Population ===
At the time of the 2006 National Census, the village's population was 461 in 110 households. The following census in 2011 counted 376 people in 107 households. The 2016 census measured the population of the village as 295 people in 96 households.
