= Qezlar Bolaghi =

Village in Zanjan province, Iran

Qezlar Bolaghi Persian: قزلاربلاغي
- Village
- Location within Iran
- Coordinates: 36°40′43″N 47°54′47″E
- Country: Iran
- Province: Zanjan
- County: Zanjan
- District: Zanjanrud
- Rural District: Ghanibeyglu

Population (2016)
  - Total: 39
- Time zone: UTC+3:30 (IRST)

Qezlar Bolaghi (Persian: قزلاربلاغي) (Note: Also romanized as Qezlār Bolāghī) is a village in Ghanibeyglu Rural District of Zanjanrud District in Zanjan County, Zanjan province, Iran.

== Demographics ==
=== Population ===
At the time of the 2006 National Census, the village's population was 68 in 13 households. The following census in 2011 counted 36 people in nine households. The 2016 census measured the population of the village as 39 people in 11 households.
