= Qaheran =

Village in Zanjan province, Iran

Qaheran Persian: قاهران
- Village
- Location within Iran
- Coordinates: 36°52′05″N 48°12′44″E
- Country: Iran
- Province: Zanjan
- County: Zanjan
- District: Zanjanrud
- Rural District: Zanjanrud-e Pain

Population (2016)
  - Total: 206
- Time zone: UTC+3:30 (IRST)

Qaheran (Persian: قاهران) (Note: Also romanized as Qāharān and Qāherān; also known as Kaharān and Kakharan) is a village in Zanjanrud-e Pain Rural District of Zanjanrud District in Zanjan County, Zanjan province, Iran.

== Demographics ==
=== Population ===
At the time of the 2006 National Census, the village's population was 267 in 70 households. The following census in 2011 counted 236 people in 70 households. The 2016 census measured the population of the village as 206 people in 68 households.
