= Dulanab =

Village in Zanjan province, Iran

Dulanab Persian: دولاناب
- Village
- Location within Iran
- Coordinates: 36°53′46″N 48°07′56″E
- Country: Iran
- Province: Zanjan
- County: Zanjan
- District: Zanjanrud
- Rural District: Zanjanrud-e Pain

Population (2016)
  - Total: 529
- Time zone: UTC+3:30 (IRST)

Dulanab (Persian: دولاناب) (Note: Also romanized as Dūlānāb; also known as Dolanab and Dūlehnāb) is a village in Zanjanrud-e Pain Rural District of Zanjanrud District in Zanjan County, Zanjan province, Iran.

== Demographics ==
=== Population ===
At the time of the 2006 National Census, the village's population was 689 in 156 households. The following census in 2011 counted 630 people in 166 households. The 2016 census measured the population of the village as 529 people in 161 households.
