= Qareh Aqajlu =

Village in Zanjan province, Iran

Qareh Aqajlu Persian: قره آقاجلو
- Village
- Location within Iran
- Coordinates: 37°08′14″N 48°01′04″E
- Country: Iran
- Province: Zanjan
- County: Zanjan
- District: Zanjanrud
- Rural District: Zanjanrud-e Pain

Population (2016)
  - Total: 55
- Time zone: UTC+3:30 (IRST)

Qareh Aqajlu (Persian: قره آقاجلو) (Note: Also romanized as Qareh Āqājl’ū; also known as Kara-Agach, Qara Aghāch, Qarah Āghājlū, Qareh Āghājlū, Qareh Āqāch, and Qareh Āqāchlū) is a village in Zanjanrud-e Pain Rural District of Zanjanrud District in Zanjan County, Zanjan province, Iran.

== Demographics ==
=== Population ===
At the time of the 2006 National Census, the village's population was 58 in 15 households. The following census in 2011 counted 51 people in 16 households. The 2016 census measured the population of the village as 55 people in 23 households.
