= Dalaki, Zanjan =

Village in Zanjan province, Iran

Dalaki Persian: دلكي
- Village
- Location within Iran
- Coordinates: 37°05′35″N 47°59′29″E
- Country: Iran
- Province: Zanjan
- County: Zanjan
- District: Zanjanrud
- Rural District: Zanjanrud-e Pain

Population (2016)
  - Total: 99
- Time zone: UTC+3:30 (IRST)

Dalaki (Persian: دلكي) (Note: Also romanized as Dalakī; also known as Dalagī) is a village in Zanjanrud-e Pain Rural District of Zanjanrud District in Zanjan County, Zanjan province, Iran.

== Demographics ==
=== Population ===
At the time of the 2006 National Census, the village's population was 103 in 22 households. The following census in 2011 counted 110 people in 28 households. The 2016 census measured the population of the village as 99 people in 30 households.
