= Seyfabad, Zanjan =

Village in Zanjan province, Iran

Seyfabad Persian: سيف اباد
- Village
- Location within Iran
- Coordinates: 36°57′44″N 48°07′49″E
- Country: Iran
- Province: Zanjan
- County: Zanjan
- District: Zanjanrud
- Rural District: Zanjanrud-e Pain

Population (2016)
  - Total: 51
- Time zone: UTC+3:30 (IRST)

Seyfabad (Persian: سيف اباد) (Note: Also romanized as Seyfābād; also known as Safiābād and Seyfiabad) is a village in Zanjanrud-e Pain Rural District of Zanjanrud District in Zanjan County, Zanjan province, Iran.

== Demographics ==
=== Population ===
At the time of the 2006 National Census, the village's population was 141 in 28 households. The following census in 2011 counted 94 people in 17 households. The 2016 census measured the population of the village as 51 people in 14 households.
