= Chapar, Zanjan =

Village in Zanjan province, Iran

Chapar Persian: چپر
- Village
- Location within Iran
- Coordinates: 37°00′01″N 47°36′44″E
- Country: Iran
- Province: Zanjan
- County: Zanjan
- District: Zanjanrud
- Rural District: Chaypareh-ye Pain

Population (2016)
  - Total: 63
- Time zone: UTC+3:30 (IRST)

Chapar (Persian: چپر) is a village in Chaypareh-ye Pain Rural District of Zanjanrud District in Zanjan County, Zanjan province, Iran.

== Demographics ==
=== Population ===
At the time of the 2006 National Census, the village's population was 91 in 18 households. The following census in 2011 counted 77 people in 16 households. The 2016 census measured the population of the village as 63 people in 17 households.
