= Almalu, Zanjan =

Village in Zanjan province, Iran

Almalu Persian: المالو
- Village
- Location within Iran
- Coordinates: 36°54′49″N 48°11′33″E
- Country: Iran
- Province: Zanjan
- County: Zanjan
- District: Zanjanrud
- Rural District: Zanjanrud-e Pain

Population (2016)
  - Total: 74
- Time zone: UTC+3:30 (IRST)

Almalu (Persian: المالو) (Note: Also romanized as Ālmālū; also known as Almali) is a village in Zanjanrud-e Pain Rural District of Zanjanrud District in Zanjan County, Zanjan province, Iran.

== Demographics ==
=== Population ===
At the time of the 2006 National Census, the village's population was 67 in 16 households. The following census in 2011 counted 77 people in 19 households. The 2016 census measured the population of the village as 74 people in 21 households.
