= Gomeshabad =

Village in Zanjan province, Iran

Gomeshabad Persian: گمش اباد
- Village
- Location within Iran
- Coordinates: 36°59′58″N 47°59′11″E
- Country: Iran
- Province: Zanjan
- County: Zanjan
- District: Zanjanrud
- Rural District: Zanjanrud-e Pain

Population (2016)
  - Total: 726
- Time zone: UTC+3:30 (IRST)

Gomeshabad (Persian: گمش اباد) (Note: Also romanized as Gomeshābād; also known as Gomīshābād) is a village in Zanjanrud-e Pain Rural District of Zanjanrud District in Zanjan County, Zanjan province, Iran.

== Demographics ==
=== Population ===
At the time of the 2006 National Census, the village's population was 851 in 189 households. The following census in 2011 counted 855 people in 221 households. The 2016 census measured the population of the village as 726 people in 213 households.
