= Bozusha =

Village in Zanjan province, Iran

Bozusha Persian: بزوشا
- Village
- Location within Iran
- Coordinates: 36°47′27″N 48°04′06″E
- Country: Iran
- Province: Zanjan
- County: Zanjan
- District: Zanjanrud
- Rural District: Ghanibeyglu

Population (2016)
  - Total: 655
- Time zone: UTC+3:30 (IRST)

Bozusha (Persian: بزوشا) (Note: Also romanized as Bozūshā; also known as Bazoo Shah, Bazūshāh, Bazushakh, Bozowshā, and Bozūsheh) is a village in Ghanibeyglu Rural District of Zanjanrud District in Zanjan County, Zanjan province, Iran.

== Demographics ==
=== Population ===
At the time of the 2006 National Census, the village's population was 768 in 172 households. The following census in 2011 counted 716 people in 196 households. The 2016 census measured the population of the village as 655 people in 170 households.
