= Owzaj =

Village in Zanjan province, Iran

Owzaj Persian: اوزج
- Village
- Location within Iran
- Coordinates: 36°47′51″N 47°53′51″E
- Country: Iran
- Province: Zanjan
- County: Zanjan
- District: Zanjanrud
- Rural District: Ghanibeyglu

Population (2016)
  - Total: 0
- Time zone: UTC+3:30 (IRST)

Owzaj (Persian: اوزج) (Note: Also romanized as Ūzaj) is a village in Ghanibeyglu Rural District of Zanjanrud District in Zanjan County, Zanjan province, Iran.

== Demographics ==
=== Population ===
At the time of the 2006 National Census, the village's population was four in four households. The following census in 2011 counted seven people in four households. The 2016 census measured the population of the village as zero.
