= Hammamlu =

Hammamlu or Hamamlu (Persian: حماملو) may refer to:

- Hammamlu, Ardabil
- Hamamlu, East Azerbaijan
- Hammamlu-e Bala, Zanjan Province
- Hammamlu-e Pain, Zanjan Province
