= Arabcheh =

Village in Zanjan province, Iran

Arabcheh Persian: عربچه
- Village
- Location within Iran
- Country: Iran
- Province: Zanjan
- County: Zanjan
- District: Zanjanrud
- Rural District: Zanjanrud-e Pain

Population (2016)
  - Total: 41
- Time zone: UTC+3:30 (IRST)

Arabcheh (Persian: عربچه) (Note: Also romanized as ‘Arabcheh; also known as ‘Arabchāh, Arabchakh, ‘Arafsheh, and ‘Aruqsheh; formerly known as Arabshah (عربشاه)) is a village in Zanjanrud-e Pain Rural District of Zanjanrud District in Zanjan County, Zanjan province, Iran.

== Demographics ==
=== Population ===
At the time of the 2006 National Census, the village's population was 59 in 13 households. The following census in 2011 counted 41 people in nine households. The 2016 census measured the population of the village as 41 people in nine households.
