= Qarah Aghaj-e Sofla =

Village in Zanjan province, Iran

Qarah Aghaj-e Sofla Persian: قره اغاج سفلي
- Village
- Location within Iran
- Coordinates: 36°57′30″N 47°30′51″E
- Country: Iran
- Province: Zanjan
- County: Zanjan
- District: Zanjanrud
- Rural District: Chaypareh-ye Pain

Population (2016)
  - Total: 237
- Time zone: UTC+3:30 (IRST)

Qarah Aghaj-e Sofla (Persian: قره اغاج سفلي) (Note: Also romanized as Qarah Āghāj-e Soflá; also known as Qarah Āqāj-e Soflá and Qareh Āqāj-e Soflá) is a village in Chaypareh-ye Pain Rural District of Zanjanrud District in Zanjan County, Zanjan province, Iran.

== Demographics ==
=== Population ===
At the time of the 2006 National Census, the village's population was 356 in 64 households. The following census in 2011 counted 295 people in 60 households. The 2016 census measured the population of the village as 237 people in 66 households.
