= Qalaychi, Zanjan =

Village in Zanjan province, Iran

Qalaychi Persian: قلايچي
- Village
- Location within Iran
- Coordinates: 37°05′12″N 48°09′13″E
- Country: Iran
- Province: Zanjan
- County: Zanjan
- District: Zanjanrud
- Rural District: Zanjanrud-e Pain

Population (2016)
  - Total: 67
- Time zone: UTC+3:30 (IRST)

Qalaychi (Persian: قلايچي) (Note: Also romanized as Qalāychī; also known as Kalāchī, Kalahchi, and Kalakhchi) is a village in Zanjanrud-e Pain Rural District of Zanjanrud District in Zanjan County, Zanjan province, Iran.

== Demographics ==
=== Population ===
At the time of the 2006 National Census, the village's population was 89 in 19 households. The following census in 2011 counted 93 people in 22 households. The 2016 census measured the population of the village as 67 people in 21 households.
