= Aliabad, Zanjanrud =

Village in Zanjan province, Iran

Aliabad Persian: علی آباد
- Village
- Location within Iran
- Coordinates: 36°47′26″N 47°48′51″E
- Country: Iran
- Province: Zanjan
- County: Zanjan
- District: Zanjanrud
- Rural District: Ghanibeyglu

Population (2016)
  - Total: 107
- Time zone: UTC+3:30 (IRST)

Aliabad (Persian: علی‌آباد) (Note: Also romanized as ‘Alīābād) is a village in Ghanibeyglu Rural District of Zanjanrud District in Zanjan County, Zanjan province, Iran.

== Demographics ==
=== Population ===
At the time of the 2006 National Census, the village's population was 335 in 81 households. The following census in 2011 counted 203 people in 64 households. The 2016 census measured the population of the village as 107 people in 38 households.
