= Degerman Daresi =

Village in Zanjan province, Iran

Degerman Daresi Persian: دگرمان درسي
- Village
- Location within Iran
- Coordinates: 36°48′12″N 47°47′33″E
- Country: Iran
- Province: Zanjan
- County: Zanjan
- District: Zanjanrud
- Rural District: Ghanibeyglu

Population (2016)
  - Total: 193
- Time zone: UTC+3:30 (IRST)

Degerman Daresi (Persian: دگرمان درسي) (Note: Also romanized as Degermān Daresī; also known as Degermān Darrehsī) is a village in Ghanibeyglu Rural District of Zanjanrud District in Zanjan County, Zanjan province, Iran.

== Demographics ==
=== Population ===
At the time of the 2006 National Census, the village's population was 331 in 79 households. The following census in 2011 counted 245 people in 72 households. The 2016 census measured the population of the village as 193 people in 70 households.
