= Qalicheh Bolagh =

Village in Zanjan province, Iran

Qalicheh Bolagh Persian: قاليچه بلاغ
- Village
- Location within Iran
- Coordinates: 36°48′22″N 47°51′02″E
- Country: Iran
- Province: Zanjan
- County: Zanjan
- District: Zanjanrud
- Rural District: Ghanibeyglu

Population (2016)
  - Total: Below reporting threshold
- Time zone: UTC+3:30 (IRST)

Qalicheh Bolagh (Persian: قاليچه بلاغ) (Note: Also romanized as Qālīcheh Bolāgh) is a village in Ghanibeyglu Rural District of Zanjanrud District in Zanjan County, Zanjan province, Iran.

== Demographics ==
=== Population ===
At the time of the 2006 National Census, the village's population was 32 in seven households. The following census in 2011 counted 16 people in five households. The population of the village at the 2016 census was below the reporting threshold.
