= Arband =

Arband (Persian: اربند) may refer to:

- Arband, Razavi Khorasan
- Arband, Zanjan
