= Noropithecus =

Noropithecus Temporal range: Early Miocene

Scientific classification
- Kingdom: Animalia
- Phylum: Chordata
- Class: Mammalia
- Order: Primates
- Suborder: Haplorhini
- Infraorder: Simiiformes
- Family: †Victoriapithecidae
- Genus: †Noropithecus; Miller et al. 2009

Type species
- Noropithecus bulukensis Miller et al. 2009

Extinct genus of Old World monkeys

Noropithecus is an extinct Old World monkey uncovered from the Early Miocene formations of Buluk, Kenya. It is known from a fragment of a right mandible. It is believed to have been arboreal and omnivorous.

== Palaeoecology ==
The dental microwear of N. bulukensis indicates it ate grass and leaves, in contrast with its bunodont dentition and previous conclusions based on its dental morphology that it was a frugivore. This discrepancy can potentially be explained by the fact that dental microwear only reflects the diet in the last few days to weeks of an animal's life, and the studied individual may have predominantly eaten fruit in its life while happening to have mainly eaten leaves and grass in the last days of its life.
