= Cherlanqush =

Village in Zanjan province, Iran

Cherlanqush Persian: چر لانقوش
- Village
- Location within Iran
- Coordinates: 36°52′47″N 47°42′19″E
- Country: Iran
- Province: Zanjan
- County: Zanjan
- District: Zanjanrud
- Rural District: Ghanibeyglu

Population (2016)
  - Total: 128
- Time zone: UTC+3:30 (IRST)

Cherlanqush (Persian: چر لانقوش) (Note: Also romanized as Cherlānqūsh; also known as Cherlān Qūch) is a village in Ghanibeyglu Rural District of Zanjanrud District in Zanjan County, Zanjan province, Iran.

== Demographics ==
=== Population ===
At the time of the 2006 National Census, the village's population was 200 in 44 households. The following census in 2011 counted 183 people in 55 households. The 2016 census measured the population of the village as 128 people in 40 households.
