= Govalan =

Village in Zanjan province, Iran

Govalan Persian: گوالان
- Village
- Location within Iran
- Coordinates: 37°07′56″N 47°51′16″E
- Country: Iran
- Province: Zanjan
- County: Zanjan
- District: Zanjanrud
- Rural District: Zanjanrud-e Pain

Population (2016)
  - Total: 222
- Time zone: UTC+3:30 (IRST)

Govalan (Persian: گوالان) (Note: Also romanized as Govālān; also known as Gūgalān) is a village in Zanjanrud-e Pain Rural District of Zanjanrud District in Zanjan County, Zanjan province, Iran.

== Demographics ==
=== Population ===
At the time of the 2006 National Census, the village's population was 336 in 78 households. The following census in 2011 counted 329 people in 89 households. The 2016 census measured the population of the village as 222 people in 66 households.
