= Moshampa =

Village in Zanjan province, Iran

Moshampa Persian: مشمپا
- Village
- Location within Iran
- Coordinates: 36°56′41″N 47°40′31″E
- Country: Iran
- Province: Zanjan
- County: Zanjan
- District: Zanjanrud
- Rural District: Chaypareh-ye Pain

Population (2016)
  - Total: 1,203
- Time zone: UTC+3:30 (IRST)

Moshampa (Persian: مشمپا) (Note: Also romanized as Moshampā) is a village in Chaypareh-ye Pain Rural District of Zanjanrud District in Zanjan County, Zanjan province, Iran.

== Demographics ==
=== Population ===
At the time of the 2006 National Census, the village's population was 1,195 in 288 households. The following census in 2011 counted 1,229 people in 339 households. The 2016 census measured the population of the village as 1,203 people in 382 households. It was the most populous village in its rural district.
