= Darreh Lik =

Village in Zanjan province, Iran

Darreh Lik Persian: دره ليك
- Village
- Location within Iran
- Coordinates: 36°50′18″N 48°09′16″E
- Country: Iran
- Province: Zanjan
- County: Zanjan
- District: Zanjanrud
- Rural District: Zanjanrud-e Pain

Population (2016)
  - Total: 330
- Time zone: UTC+3:30 (IRST)

Darreh Lik (Persian: دره ليك) (Note: Also romanized as Darehlīk and Darreh Līk; also known as Darrekhlik) is a village in Zanjanrud-e Pain Rural District of Zanjanrud District in Zanjan County, Zanjan province, Iran.

== Demographics ==
=== Population ===
At the time of the 2006 National Census, the village's population was 419 in 103 households. The following census in 2011 counted 357 people in 99 households. The 2016 census measured the population of the village as 330 people in 99 households.
