= Iljaq =

Village in Zanjan province, Iran

Iljaq Persian: ايلجاق
- Village
- Location within Iran
- Coordinates: 37°01′52″N 47°32′26″E
- Country: Iran
- Province: Zanjan
- County: Zanjan
- District: Zanjanrud
- Rural District: Chaypareh-ye Pain

Population (2016)
  - Total: 547
- Time zone: UTC+3:30 (IRST)

Iljaq (Persian: ايلجاق) (Note: Also romanized as Īljāq) is a village in Chaypareh-ye Pain Rural District of Zanjanrud District in Zanjan County, Zanjan province, Iran.

== Demographics ==
=== Population ===
At the time of the 2006 National Census, the village's population was 576 in 121 households. The following census in 2011 counted 569 people in 129 households. The 2016 census measured the population of the village as 547 people in 148 households.
