= Hasanabad, Zanjan =

Village in Zanjan province, Iran

Hasanabad Persian: حسن اباد
- Village
- Location within Iran
- Coordinates: 36°52′02″N 48°08′45″E
- Country: Iran
- Province: Zanjan
- County: Zanjan
- District: Zanjanrud
- Rural District: Zanjanrud-e Pain

Population (2016)
  - Total: 21
- Time zone: UTC+3:30 (IRST)

Hasanabad (Persian: حسن اباد) (Note: Also romanized as Hasanābād; also known as Ḩasanābād-e Tāzeh Kand, Tāzeh Kand, Tāzeh Kand-e Ḩasanābād, and Tazekhkend) is a village in Zanjanrud-e Pain Rural District of Zanjanrud District in Zanjan County, Zanjan province, Iran.

== Demographics ==
=== Population ===
At the time of the 2006 National Census, the village's population was 79 in 16 households. The following census in 2011 counted 40 people in eight households. The 2016 census measured the population of the village as 21 people in six households.
