= Fileh Khasseh =

Village in Zanjan province, Iran

Fileh Khasseh Persian: فيله خاصه
- Village
- Location within Iran
- Coordinates: 37°04′21″N 48°02′18″E
- Country: Iran
- Province: Zanjan
- County: Zanjan
- District: Zanjanrud
- Rural District: Zanjanrud-e Pain

Population (2016)
  - Total: 74
- Time zone: UTC+3:30 (IRST)

Fileh Khasseh (Persian: فيله خاصه) (Note: Also romanized as Filah Khāsah, Fīlah Khāşeh, and Fīleh Khāşşeh; also known as Filakh-Khasakh, Fīleh Khāleşeh, and Peleh Khāseh) is a village in Zanjanrud-e Pain Rural District of Zanjanrud District in Zanjan County, Zanjan province, Iran.

== Demographics ==
=== Population ===
At the time of the 2006 National Census, the village's population was 104 in 23 households. The following census in 2011 counted 86 people in 27 households. The 2016 census measured the population of the village as 74 people in 28 households.
