= Qezeljeh-ye Sofla, Zanjan =

Village in Zanjan province, Iran

Qezeljeh-ye Sofla Persian: قزلجه سفلي
- Village
- Location within Iran
- Coordinates: 36°54′03″N 47°48′52″E
- Country: Iran
- Province: Zanjan
- County: Zanjan
- District: Zanjanrud
- Rural District: Ghanibeyglu

Population (2016)
  - Total: 46
- Time zone: UTC+3:30 (IRST)

Qezeljeh-ye Sofla (Persian: قزلجه سفلي) (Note: Also romanized as Qezeljeh-ye Soflá) is a village in Ghanibeyglu Rural District of Zanjanrud District in Zanjan County, Zanjan province, Iran.

== Demographics ==
=== Population ===
At the time of the 2006 National Census, the village's population was 82 in 18 households. The following census in 2011 counted 73 people in 21 households. The 2016 census measured the population of the village as 46 people in 14 households.
