= Qarah Kul =

Village in Zanjan province, Iran

Qarah Kul Persian: قره كول
- Village
- Location within Iran
- Coordinates: 36°46′43″N 48°02′01″E
- Country: Iran
- Province: Zanjan
- County: Zanjan
- District: Zanjanrud
- Rural District: Ghanibeyglu

Population (2016)
  - Total: 215
- Time zone: UTC+3:30 (IRST)

Qarah Kul (Persian: قره كول) (Note: Also romanized as Qarah Kūl, Qareh Kowl, and Qareh Kūl; also known as Karakol, Qarakol, and Qareh Kol) is a village in Ghanibeyglu Rural District of Zanjanrud District in Zanjan County, Zanjan province, Iran.

== Demographics ==
=== Population ===
At the time of the 2006 National Census, the village's population was 423 in 104 households. The following census in 2011 counted 306 people in 84 households. The 2016 census measured the population of the village as 215 people in 70 households.
