= Sarcham-e Sofla =

Village in Zanjan province, Iran

Sarcham-e Sofla Persian: سرچم سفلي
- Village
- Location within Iran
- Coordinates: 37°07′21″N 47°54′39″E
- Country: Iran
- Province: Zanjan
- County: Zanjan
- District: Zanjanrud
- Rural District: Zanjanrud-e Pain

Population (2016)
  - Total: 146
- Time zone: UTC+3:30 (IRST)

Sarcham-e Sofla (Persian: سرچم سفلي) (Note: Also romanized as Sarcham-e Soflá; also known as Sar Cham, Sarcham Pa’īn, and Sarcham-e Pā’īn) is a village in Zanjanrud-e Pain Rural District of Zanjanrud District in Zanjan County, Zanjan province, Iran.

== Demographics ==
=== Population ===
At the time of the 2006 National Census, the village's population was 248 in 49 households. The following census in 2011 counted 205 people in 51 households. The 2016 census measured the population of the village as 146 people in 45 households.
