= Hammamlu-e Pain =

Village in Zanjan province, Iran

Hammamlu-e Pain Persian: حماملو پايين
- Village
- Location within Iran
- Coordinates: 37°07′10″N 48°05′30″E
- Country: Iran
- Province: Zanjan
- County: Zanjan
- District: Zanjanrud
- Rural District: Zanjanrud-e Pain

Population (2016)
  - Total: 54
- Time zone: UTC+3:30 (IRST)

Hammamlu-e Pain (Persian: حماملو پايين) (Note: Also romanized as Ḩammāmlū-e Pāeen and Ḩammāmlū-e Pā’īn) is a village in Zanjanrud-e Pain Rural District of Zanjanrud District in Zanjan County, Zanjan province, Iran.

== Demographics ==
=== Population ===
At the time of the 2006 National Census, the village's population was 96 in 21 households. The following census in 2011 counted 84 people in 20 households. The 2016 census measured the population of the village as 84 people in 20 households.
