= Hammamlu-e Bala =

Village in Zanjan province, Iran

Hammamlu-e Bala Persian: حماملو بالا
- Village
- Location within Iran
- Coordinates: 37°07′15″N 48°06′02″E
- Country: Iran
- Province: Zanjan
- County: Zanjan
- District: Zanjanrud
- Rural District: Zanjanrud-e Pain

Population (2016)
  - Total: 16
- Time zone: UTC+3:30 (IRST)

Hammamlu-e Bala (Persian: حماملو بالا) (Note: Also romanized as Ḩammāmlū-e Bālā) is a village in Zanjanrud-e Pain Rural District of Zanjanrud District in Zanjan County, Zanjan province, Iran.

== Demographics ==
=== Population ===
At the time of the 2006 National Census, the village's population was 37 in eight households. The following census in 2011 counted 22 people in nine households. The 2016 census measured the population of the village as 16 people in eight households.
