= Rajin, Iran =

Village in Zanjan province, Iran

Rajin Persian: رجعين
- Village
- Location within Iran
- Coordinates: 37°08′13″N 47°49′41″E
- Country: Iran
- Province: Zanjan
- County: Zanjan
- District: Zanjanrud
- Rural District: Zanjanrud-e Pain

Population (2016)
  - Total: 1,640
- Time zone: UTC+3:30 (IRST)

Rajin (Persian: رجعين) (Note: Also romanized as Raja’īn, Raj‘īn, and Raj’īn) is a village in Zanjanrud-e Pain Rural District of Zanjanrud District in Zanjan County, Zanjan province, Iran.

== Demographics ==
=== Population ===
At the time of the 2006 National Census, the village's population was 1,762 in 461 households. The following census in 2011 counted 1,603 people in 489 households. The 2016 census measured the population of the village as 1,640 people in 541 households. It was the most populous village in its rural district.
