= Arbat, Zanjan =

Village in Zanjan province, Iran

Arbat Persian: اربط
- Village
- Location within Iran
- Coordinates: 36°49′07″N 48°02′26″E
- Country: Iran
- Province: Zanjan
- County: Zanjan
- District: Zanjanrud
- Rural District: Ghanibeyglu

Population (2016)
  - Total: 114
- Time zone: UTC+3:30 (IRST)

Arbat (Persian: اربط) (Note: Also romanized as Arbaţ; also known as Arband) is a village in Ghanibeyglu Rural District of Zanjanrud District in Zanjan County, Zanjan province, Iran.

== Demographics ==
=== Population ===
At the time of the 2006 National Census, the village's population was 144 in 33 households. The following census in 2011 counted 126 people in 36 households. The 2016 census measured the population of the village as 114 people in 33 households.
