= Kahab =

Village in Zanjan province, Iran

Kahab Persian: كهاب
- Village
- Location within Iran
- Coordinates: 36°58′46″N 48°05′37″E
- Country: Iran
- Province: Zanjan
- County: Zanjan
- District: Zanjanrud
- Rural District: Zanjanrud-e Pain

Population (2016)
  - Total: 157
- Time zone: UTC+3:30 (IRST)

Kahab (Persian: كهاب) (Note: Also romanized as Kahāb; also known as Kakhab, Qahāb (قهاب), and Qohāb) is a village in Zanjanrud-e Pain Rural District of Zanjanrud District in Zanjan County, Zanjan province, Iran.

== Demographics ==
=== Population ===
At the time of the 2006 National Census, the village's population was 219 in 53 households. The following census in 2011 counted 207 people in 51 households. The 2016 census measured the population of the village as 157 people in 49 households.
