= Rajin =

Rajin may refer to:

== Places ==
- Rajin-guyok, a district on the northeast coast of North Korea
  - Rajin station, a railway station in Rajin-guyŏk
- Rajin-Sŏnbong, now known as Rason, a North Korean city and ice-free port in the Sea of Japan in the North Pacific Ocean on the northeast tip of North Korea
- Rajin, Iran, a village in Zanjanrud-e Pain Rural District, Zanjanrud District, Zanjan County, Zanjan Province, Iran

== People ==
Given name

- Rajin (singer), or Rijan, a Danish singer known as Node of Kurdish origin
- Rajin Saleh (born 1983), Bangladeshi cricketer

Surname

- Momčilo Rajin (born 1954), Serbian art and music critic, theorist and historian, artist, publisher
