= Sari Kand-e Kabali =

Village in Zanjan province, Iran

Sari Kand-e Kabali Persian: ساري كندكابلي
- Village
- Location within Iran
- Coordinates: 36°58′29″N 47°32′37″E
- Country: Iran
- Province: Zanjan
- County: Zanjan
- District: Zanjanrud
- Rural District: Chaypareh-ye Pain

Population (2016)
  - Total: 198
- Time zone: UTC+3:30 (IRST)

Sari Kand-e Kabali (Persian: ساري كندكابلي) (Note: Also romanized as Sārī Kand-e Kābalī; also known as Sārī Kand, Sārī Kand-e Pā’īn, and Sārī Kand-e Soflá) is a village in Chaypareh-ye Pain Rural District of Zanjanrud District in Zanjan County, Zanjan province, Iran.

== Demographics ==
=== Population ===
At the time of the 2006 National Census, the village's population was 101 in 23 households. The following census in 2011 counted 233 people in 59 households. The 2016 census measured the population of the village as 198 people in 56 households.
