= Andabad-e Sofla =

Village in Zanjan province, Iran

Andabad-e Sofla Persian: اندابادسفلي
- Village
- Location within Iran
- Coordinates: 36°50′50″N 47°59′00″E
- Country: Iran
- Province: Zanjan
- County: Zanjan
- District: Zanjanrud
- Rural District: Ghanibeyglu

Population (2016)
  - Total: 570
- Time zone: UTC+3:30 (IRST)

Andabad-e Sofla (Persian: اندابادسفلي) (Note: Also romanized as Andābād-e Soflá) is a village in Ghanibeyglu Rural District of Zanjanrud District in Zanjan County, Zanjan province, Iran.

== Demographics ==
=== Population ===
At the time of the 2006 National Census, the village's population was 831 in 216 households. The following census in 2011 counted 738 people in 225 households. The 2016 census measured the population of the village as 570 people in 191 households.
