= Baghlujeh-ye Aqa =

Village in Zanjan province, Iran

Baghlujeh-ye Aqa Persian: باغلوجه اقا
- Village
- Location within Iran
- Coordinates: 36°48′58″N 48°12′06″E
- Country: Iran
- Province: Zanjan
- County: Zanjan
- District: Zanjanrud
- Rural District: Zanjanrud-e Pain

Population (2016)
  - Total: 99
- Time zone: UTC+3:30 (IRST)

Baghlujeh-ye Aqa (Persian: باغلوجه اقا) (Note: Also romanized as Bāghlūjeh-ye Āqā; also known as Baghlūjah, Bāghlūjeh, and Bagludzhakh) is a village in Zanjanrud-e Pain Rural District of Zanjanrud District in Zanjan County, Zanjan province, Iran.

== Demographics ==
=== Population ===
At the time of the 2006 National Census, the village's population was 220 in 53 households. The following census in 2011 counted 172 people in 49 households. The 2016 census measured the population of the village as 99 people in 30 households.
