= Qohab =

Qohab (Persian: قهاب) may refer to:

- Qohab, Zanjan
- Qohab-e Rastaq Rural District, in Semnan Province
- Qohab-e Sarsar Rural District, in Semnan Province

== See also ==
- Qahab
