= Anjoman-e Olya =

Village in Zanjan province, Iran

Anjoman-e Olya Persian: انجمن عليا
- Village
- Location within Iran
- Coordinates: 37°00′03″N 47°34′26″E
- Country: Iran
- Province: Zanjan
- County: Zanjan
- District: Zanjanrud
- Rural District: Chaypareh-ye Pain

Population (2016)
  - Total: 175
- Time zone: UTC+3:30 (IRST)

Anjoman-e Olya (Persian: انجمن عليا) (Note: Also romanized as Anjoman-e ‘Olyā) is a village in Chaypareh-ye Pain Rural District of Zanjanrud District in Zanjan County, Zanjan province, Iran.

== Demographics ==
=== Population ===
At the time of the 2006 National Census, the village's population was 382 in 66 households. The following census in 2011 counted 235 people in 54 households. The 2016 census measured the population of the village as 175 people in 47 households.
