= Minan =

Minan (Persian: مينان) may refer to:

- Minan, Sistan and Baluchestan
- Minan, Zanjan
- Minan Rural District, in Sistan and Baluchestan Province

== See also ==
- Min'an, a subdistrict in Hunan, China
