= Bolugh =

Village in Zanjan province, Iran

Bolugh Persian: بلوغ
- Village
- Location within Iran
- Coordinates: 36°59′01″N 48°10′55″E
- Country: Iran
- Province: Zanjan
- County: Zanjan
- District: Zanjanrud
- Rural District: Zanjanrud-e Pain

Population (2016)
  - Total: 31
- Time zone: UTC+3:30 (IRST)

Bolugh (Persian: بلوغ) (Note: Also romanized as Bolūgh; also known as Bolūk and Buluk) is a village in Zanjanrud-e Pain Rural District of Zanjanrud District in Zanjan County, Zanjan province, Iran.

== Demographics ==
=== Population ===
At the time of the 2006 National Census, the village's population was 36 in seven households. The following census in 2011 counted 35 people in nine households. The 2016 census measured the population of the village as 31 people in nine households.
