= Mirjan =

Village in Zanjan province, Iran

Mirjan Persian: ميرجان
- Village
- Location within Iran
- Coordinates: 36°44′34″N 48°00′06″E
- Country: Iran
- Province: Zanjan
- County: Zanjan
- District: Zanjanrud
- Rural District: Qanibeyglu

Population (2016)
  - Total: 1,270
- Time zone: UTC+3:30 (IRST)

Mirjan (Persian: ميرجان) (Note: Also romanized as Mīr Jān, Mirdzhan, and Mīrjān; also known as Merījān) is a village in Qanibeyglu Rural District of Zanjanrud District in Zanjan County, Zanjan province, Iran.

== Demographics ==
=== Population ===
At the time of the 2006 National Census, the village's population was 1,359 in 325 households. The following census in 2011 counted 1,269 people in 386 households. The 2016 census measured the population of the village as 1,270 people in 415 households. It was the most populous village in its rural district.

== Notable people ==
Mirjan is the home town of famous coastal line builder Mr. Ashrith Naik, who is also the youth leader and inspiration to people of Mirjan-BBC.
