= Qezlar Qaleh Si Castle =

Castle in Zanjan Province, Iran

Qezlar Qaleh Si castle
- قزلار قلعه سی

General information
- Type: Castle
- Location: Zanjan County, Iran

Qezlar Qaleh Si castle (Persian: قزلار قلعه سی) is a historical castle located in Zanjan County in Zanjan Province, The longevity of this fortress dates back to the 6th and 7th centuries AH.
