= Sari Kand-e Olya =

Village in Zanjan province, Iran

Sari Kand-e Olya Persian: ساري كندعليا
- Village
- Location within Iran
- Coordinates: 36°57′56″N 47°32′36″E
- Country: Iran
- Province: Zanjan
- County: Zanjan
- District: Zanjanrud
- Rural District: Chaypareh-ye Pain

Population (2016)
  - Total: 107
- Time zone: UTC+3:30 (IRST)

Sari Kand-e Olya (Persian: ساري كندعليا) (Note: Also romanized as Sārī Kand-e ‘Olyā) is a village in Chaypareh-ye Pain Rural District of Zanjanrud District in Zanjan County, Zanjan province, Iran.

== Demographics ==
=== Population ===
At the time of the 2006 National Census, the village's population was 166 in 33 households. The following census in 2011 counted 122 people in 29 households. The 2016 census measured the population of the village as 107 people in 29 households.
