= Taqi Kandi, Zanjan =

Village in Zanjan province, Iran

Taqi Kandi Persian: تقي كندي
- Village
- Location within Iran
- Coordinates: 36°43′31″N 47°52′47″E
- Country: Iran
- Province: Zanjan
- County: Zanjan
- District: Zanjanrud
- Rural District: Ghanibeyglu

Population (2016)
  - Total: 152
- Time zone: UTC+3:30 (IRST)

Taqi Kandi (Persian: تقي كندي) (Note: Also romanized as Taqī Kandī) is a village in Ghanibeyglu Rural District of Zanjanrud District in Zanjan County, Zanjan province, Iran.

== Demographics ==
=== Population ===
At the time of the 2006 National Census, the village's population was 163 in 40 households. The following census in 2011 counted 174 people in 40 households. The 2016 census measured the population of the village as 152 people in 41 households.
