= Minan, Zanjan =

Village in Zanjan province, Iran

Minan Persian: مينان
- Village
- Location within Iran
- Coordinates: 36°46′09″N 47°47′48″E
- Country: Iran
- Province: Zanjan
- County: Zanjan
- District: Zanjanrud
- Rural District: Ghanibeyglu

Population (2016)
  - Total: 85
- Time zone: UTC+3:30 (IRST)

Minan (Persian: مينان) (Note: Also romanized as Mīnān) is a village in Ghanibeyglu Rural District of Zanjanrud District in Zanjan County, Zanjan province, Iran.

== Demographics ==
=== Population ===
At the time of the 2006 National Census, the village's population was 139 in 29 households. The following census in 2011 counted 126 people in 36 households. The 2016 census measured the population of the village as 85 people in 24 households.
