= Baghlujeh-ye Sardar =

Village in Zanjan province, Iran

Baghlujeh-ye Sardar Persian: باغلوجه سردار
- Village
- Location within Iran
- Coordinates: 36°54′55″N 48°06′53″E
- Country: Iran
- Province: Zanjan
- County: Zanjan
- District: Zanjanrud
- Rural District: Zanjanrud-e Pain

Population (2016)
  - Total: 51
- Time zone: UTC+3:30 (IRST)

Baghlujeh-ye Sardar (Persian: باغلوجه سردار) (Note: Also romanized as Bāghlūjeh Sardār and Bāghlūjeh-ye Sardār; also known as Bāghlūjah and Bagludzhakh) is a village in Zanjanrud-e Pain Rural District of Zanjanrud District in Zanjan County, Zanjan province, Iran.

== Demographics ==
=== Population ===
At the time of the 2006 National Census, the village's population was 293 in 73 households. The following census in 2011 counted 164 people in 41 households. The 2016 census measured the population of the village as 51 people in 12 households.
