= Andabad-e Olya =

Village in Zanjan province, Iran

Andabad-e Olya Persian: انداباد عليا
- Village
- Location within Iran
- Coordinates: 36°48′11″N 47°59′23″E
- Country: Iran
- Province: Zanjan
- County: Zanjan
- District: Zanjanrud
- Rural District: Ghanibeyglu

Population (2016)
  - Total: 477
- Time zone: UTC+3:30 (IRST)

Andabad-e Olya (Persian: اندابادعليا) (Note: Also romanized as Andābād-e ‘Olyā; also known as And Ābād, Andābād Oliab, Andābād ‘Ulīāb, and Andābād-e Bālā) is a village in, and the capital of, Ghanibeyglu Rural District in Zanjanrud District of Zanjan County, Zanjan province, Iran.

== Demographics ==
=== Population ===
At the time of the 2006 National Census, the village's population was 531 in 146 households. The following census in 2011 counted 671 people in 166 households. The 2016 census measured the population of the village as 477 people in 131 households.
