= Anjoman-e Sofla =

Village in Zanjan province, Iran

Anjoman-e Sofla Persian: انجمن سفلي
- Village
- Location within Iran
- Coordinates: 37°00′24″N 47°35′06″E
- Country: Iran
- Province: Zanjan
- County: Zanjan
- District: Zanjanrud
- Rural District: Chaypareh-ye Pain

Population (2016)
  - Total: 195
- Time zone: UTC+3:30 (IRST)

Anjoman-e Sofla (Persian: انجمن سفلي) (Note: Also romanized as Anjoman-e Soflá; also known as Anjoman and Anjoman-Pā’īn) is a village in Chaypareh-ye Pain Rural District of Zanjanrud District in Zanjan County, Zanjan province, Iran.

== Demographics ==
=== Population ===
At the time of the 2006 National Census, the village's population was 345 in 74 households. The following census in 2011 counted 298 people in 68 households. The 2016 census measured the population of the village as 195 people in 55 households.
