= Koytur =

Koytur may refer to:

- Koytur, Armenia
- Koytur, Iran
