= Ludhiana Mission Press =

Printing press

Lodhiana Mission Press
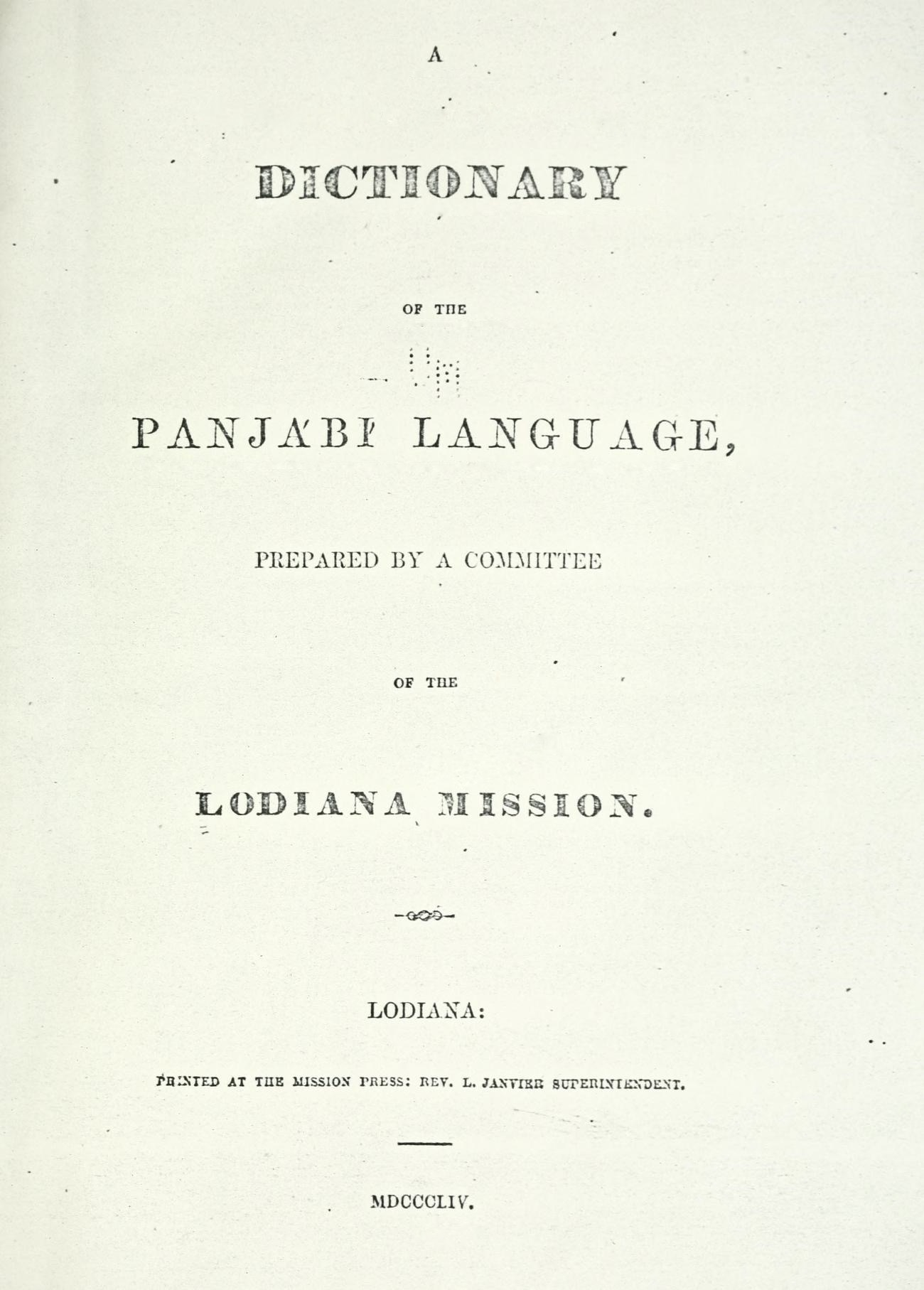
- Title-page of 'A Dictionary of the Panjabi Language' by the Ludhiana Mission (1854)
- Parent company: The Ludhiana Mission of the American Presbyterian Church
- Founded: December 1835
- Founder: John Newton; James Wilson
- Country of origin: British India
- Headquarters location: Ludhiana
- Nonfiction topics: Christian proselytism Christian evangelism

The Ludhiana Mission Press, archaically spelt as Lodhiana Mission Press and also known as the American Missionary Press, Ludhiana, was a press of the Ludhiana Mission established by Presbyterian missionaries in Ludhiana in 1835. (Note: The printing press sometimes referred to itself as 'The American Presbyterian Mission Press' in its publications.) It was the main source for Christian literature in the northwest provinces. It was more successful in the Punjab region when compared to the Serampore Mission Press, which was active decades earlier, perhaps owing to an 1812 fire that led to that press' works being less available. The Ludiana Mission is regarded as promoting the Gurmukhi script and providing the initial effort toward the eventual formation of a standardised Punjabi.

== History ==
=== Background ===
In 1811, the Serampore Mission Press had translated the New Testament into Gurmukhi Punjabi. A grammar of the Punjabi language was also produced by William Carey shortly after. However, the Serampore mission saw limited success in Punjab in this early stage of Christian proselytization. In 1833, the Presbyterian Board of Foreign Mission of the United States of America sent two missionaries, John C. Lowrie and William Reed, to India (alongside their wives). After arriving in India, they were advised by fellow missionaries, Alexander Duff and Charles Trevelyan, to target the Punjab and Sikhs in-specific for Christian evangelization efforts. Sikhs were thought to be good candidates for Christian prosletyzation and especially susceptible to Christianization because they rejected the idolatry and caste system prevalent in Hinduism and were viewed as a community with an independent-mindset. The British political agent stationed at Ludhiana, Claude Martin Wade, invited the Presbyterian missionaries. The wife of John Lowrie passed away and William Reed left India, so John proceeded to Ludhiana with the intention of establishing a school.

=== Establishment and work ===
In November 1834, John Lowrie of the American Presbyterian Mission Society, established the first Presbyterianism mission station in Ludhiana. It was the first American Presbyterian Mission Station established outside of the United States of America. Maharaja Ranjit Singh, the Sikh ruler of the independent Sikh kingdom to the northwest, invited John Lowrie to establish a school in his empire for the offspring of nobles but the plans fell-through because the Maharaja opposed the missionary practice of teaching the Gospel in study of literature and science.

According to Sahar Afshar, the Ludhiana Mission was established in Ludhiana, Punjab for the following reasons:

- Natives who came across as "less biased" in their attachment to what the missionaries perceived to be pagan ways.
- An eagerness amongst natives to become acquainted with the English language.
- A comparatively healthy population.
- A destitution of Christian missionary instruction in the region.
- The proximity of Punjab to regions such as Afghanistan, Tibet, and Kashmir, with which established trades were already in place commercially linking the Punjab to them.
- The city of Ludhiana (to which they referred as Lodiana) was chosen for its accessibility potential, possibly even being able to surpass Calcutta in this regard. Plans were being drafted for steamship routes connecting Bombay and England together. The Sutlej River located in Punjab was viewed as a convenient means of riverine travel for missionaries and travellers.

In December 1835, two missionaries arrived at the Ludhiana Mission with their wives, they were John Newton and James Wilson. Earlier, before leaving Calcutta for their mission in Ludhiana, Newton and Wilson were gifted an old, wooden printing press, paper, and ink by Reverend William H. Pierce of the Baptist Mission Press. However, Newton and Wilson did not possess the technical know-how on how to operate the printing press, therefore Pierce instructed a Bengali compositor to go along with them. The printing press was founded by two Presbyterian missionaries, reverends John Newton and James Wilson, in Ludhiana in December 1835.

In an 1886 work, recalling the establishment of the Ludhiana Mission Press, Newton states:

When Mr. Wilson and I were first in Calcutta, on our way to Lodiana, we were advised to take with us a printing press. We accordingly bought an old-fashioned wooden press, (such as were still sometimes used in those days), together with a font or two of types, paper, and printing ink. These we got from the Baptist Mission Press, then working under the superintendence of the Rev. Wm. H. Pierce, a gentleman of most lovely character, who greatly befriended our predecessors as well as ourselves. We had, neither of us, any knowledge of press work, but Mr. Pierce gave us one of his own native compositors, to assist in inaugurating the work. In the course of the next year after our arrival, that is, in 1836, a small house was built, with three apartments, one for the types and press, another for blank paper and printed matter, and the third for a Book Bindery [sic].

— John Newton (Allahabad, Allahabad Mission Press, 1886), Historical Sketches of the India Missions of the Presbyterian Church in the United States of America: Known as the Lodiana, the Farrukhabad, and the Kolhapur Missions; from the Beginning of the Work in 1834 to the Time of Its Fiftieth Anniversary in 1884

The mission press published works in almost every language and script used in the Punjab. It focused a lot of its efforts on the distribution of literature in the Punjab. To spread Christianity, the missionaries of the press established Christian religious classes on Sundays, preached at the public bazaars, and handed-out their literature. In early 1836, John Lowrie, the founder of the Ludhiana Mission, returned home due to poor health. In 1836, a Bengali compositor from the Baptist Mission Press in Calcutta gave instruction to John Newton on mechanical printing. Later in 1836 during the summertime, the first work of the Ludhiana Mission Press was published. In 1838, the mission press printed 57,743 tracts and 500 sections of the Bible to be distributed at festivals and missionary gatherings. In 1844, the press published a religious paper known as the Pilgrim's Progress. In the same year, a Bible histories that was 128-pages in-length was also released. In 1845, a fire devastated the printing press.

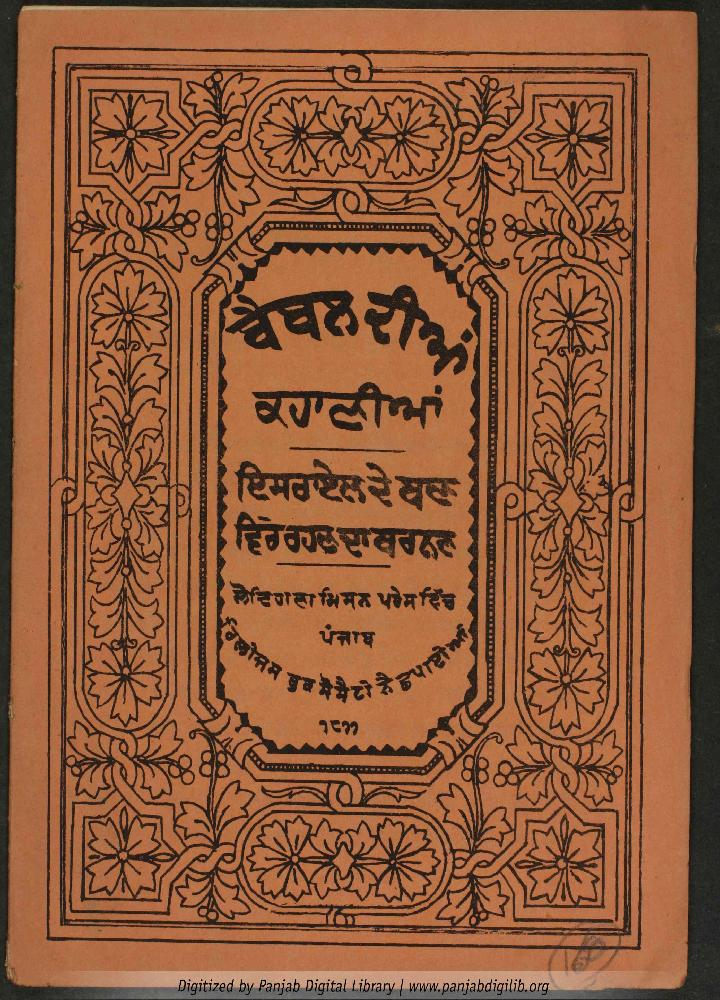
Title-page of 'Bible Diyan Kahaniaan' by the Ludhiana Mission Press, 1877

The mission press published some of the earliest works on the Punjabi-language, such as a study of its grammar (1851) and lexis (1854). During the Sepoy Mutiny of 1857, the press was burnt down by rebelling sepoys. In 1868, the mission started publishing a religious newspaper called Makhzan-i-Masihi in Allahabad. The mission published a translation of the New Testament in Punjabi in 1868. In 1873, the mission press started publishing a weekly periodical in Persian and Urdu. This was the only Christian newspaper printed in the Urdu language at the time. In 1885, 25,000 copies of tracts and books were published by the press. (Note: It was reported that in 1888, the total number of pages printed up to the end of October the same year by the press was at-least 14,441,714 pages.) By 1908, this figure had risen to 56,708 copies. The mission press had sold more than 11,000 Bible portions. In 1930, the mission press handed-out 38,000 pieces of literature (including both non-Bible literature and Bible portions) for free.

The mission press employed eighty-two Muslims, three Hindus, and thirteen Christians.

=== Lodhiana Akhbar ===
Between 1836 and at-least 1841, the press published a newspaper, Lodhiana Akhbar in the Persian-language, the first newspaper of the Punjab. (Note: Some sources name the newspaper as Akhbar Ludhiana or The Lodhiana Akhbar.) Some sources state the newspaper was created in November 1834 through the sponsorship of the British Northwest Frontier Agency. Claude Martin Wade helped with the starting of the newspaper and about 30 copies were circulated. The first issues of the newspaper were in manuscript form. Early-on, each issue of the newspaper was four-pages in-length but by 1836 it began to start publishing eight-page issues. Its circulation was limited and depended on the requirements of the British East India Company but it had readership throughout the Punjab. The names of the editors and the subscription rate of the newspaper is unknown. It published articles based on stories from English newspapers. The primary topic the newspaper published on was happenings at the durbar (court) of the Sikh Empire under Ranjit Singh. News from Lahore under the Sarkar-i-Khalsa dominated the front-page of the newspaper for several years. The stories covered in-detail the daily events at the Sikh court in Lahore, specifically writing on topics such as royal decrees to civil and military officials, and the visits of the vakils (emissaries of independent and feudatory states) to the Sikh court. Many details of Ranjit Singh's personality can be deduced from the articles the newspaper published, such as stories of the Sikh ruler displaying empathy and also harshness to his subjects. The newspaper further reported on the state of the Punjabi peasantry under Sikh rule at the time, methods of revenue collection, land inheritances of Sikh nobles, and the law-and-order situation within its borders. The newspaper also reported on the celebration of festivals. The newspaper did not solely report on matters taking place within the Sikh Empire, it also reported on news from Ludhiana that were of local and general public interest, such as the opening of English-medium schools, feats and miracles made by religiously advanced individuals (sadhus). The periodical sometimes reported on events that happened in more distant places, such as Calcutta, Leh, Hyderabad, Multan, Bahawalpur, Baluchistan, Kandahar, Bukhara, and Khyber. However, the newspaper explicitly did not report on the British activities in the Punjab through their political agencies at Ambala and Ludhiana. The newspaper avoided reporting on any matter related to the British Eats India Company or British policies at all but it freely reported on the troubles of the Sikh Empire (court politics, princely murders, power struggles, the Sikh military's power). The newspaper was written in a simple form of the Persian-language that was brief and omitting of verbose honorifical speech. The newspaper was printed and published by the Ludhiana Mission Press until June 1841, when its production shifted to the Pashauri Mall Press, Ludhiana. The newspaper ceased being published in 1844.

== Legacy ==
While initially unsuccessful, the mission and its press eventually found success at converting large sections of the Punjabi population, especially the downtrodden segments (such as Chuhras and Meghs), to Christianity. In 1914, 3,523 people were baptized by the Presbyterian missionaries.

Punjabi Christian population by year
Year	Population
1913	18,018
1916	23,424
1917	28,132

According to Maninder Kaur, the works published by the Ludhiana Mission Press had an influence on Hindus, Sikhs, and Muslims of the Punjab. The impact of the Christian mission and its press inspired the Hindu Arya Samaj, the Muslim Anjumans, and Sikh Singh Sabha organizations of the late 19th century. These religious groups emulated the Christian mission and started working for the same social and religious effects for their own community, in specific regards to carrying out religious reforms, establishing religious educational institutions, opening orphanages, providing natural disaster relief, establishing medical facilities, and providing religious instruction. However, it also increased religious rivalries and fighting, leading to an increase in communal tensions.

== Works published ==
- A Sermon for the Whole World (1836) – the first publication of the press and a Persian-language tract
- Lodiana Akhbar (1836–1841) – four-page Persian-language newspaper (Note: After 1841, the newspaper was published by the Pashauri Mall Press, Ludhiana until 1844, when its production ceased.)
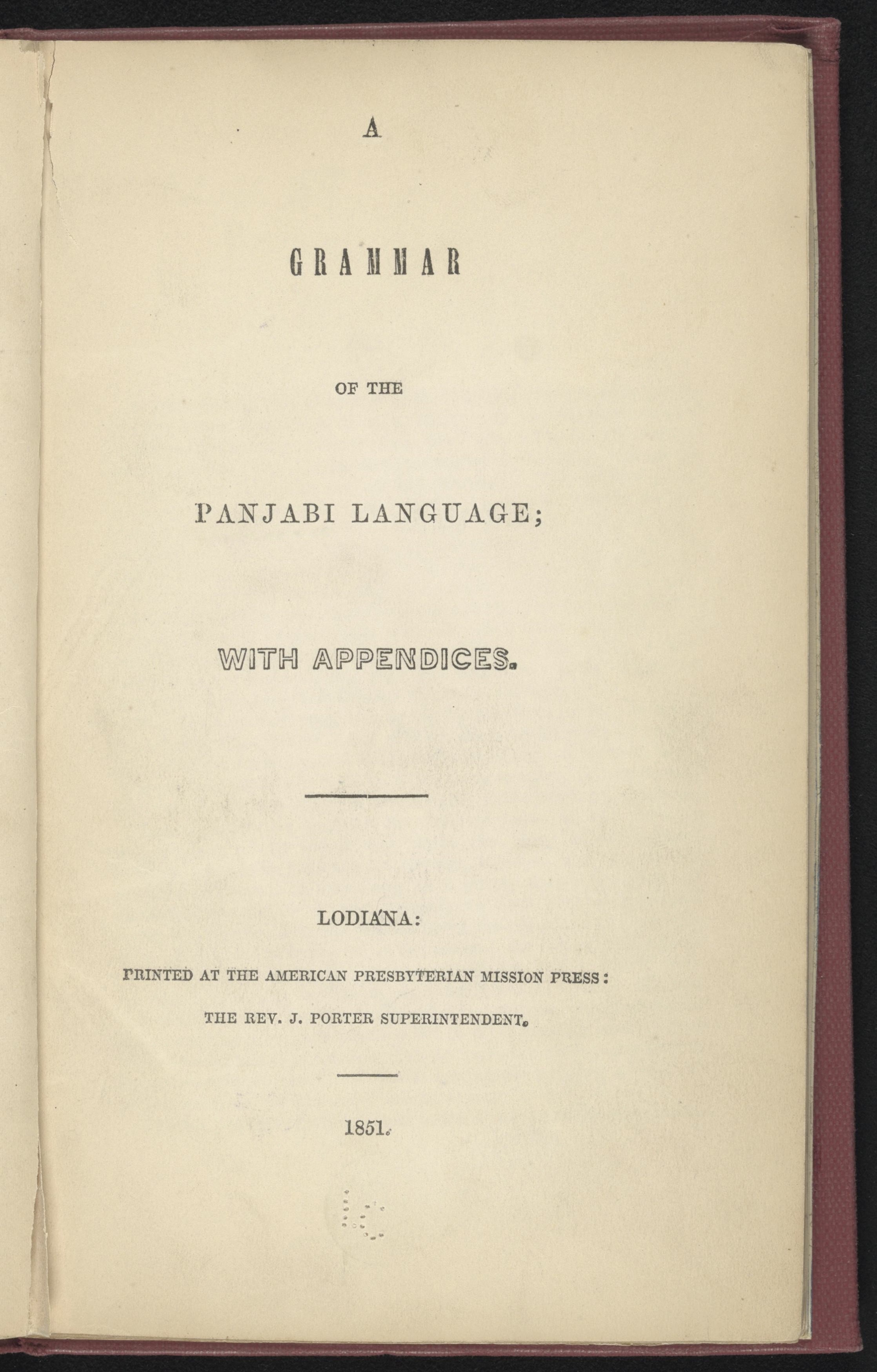
- Title-page of 'A Grammar of the Panjabi Language; With Appendices' by the Ludhiana Mission (1851)
  A Grammar of the Panjabi Language; With Appendices (1851) by John Newton
- A Dictionary of the Panjabi Language (1854) by Levi Janivers
- Makhzan-i-Masihi (1867–?) – religious paper printed at Allahabad
- Translation of the New Testament into Punjabi (1868) by John Newton
- Noar Ufshan (1873–?) – weekly Persian and Urdu newspaper by E. M. Wherry.
- Mangal Samachar ("good news") – tract
