= Sarcham-e Olya =

Village in Zanjan province, Iran

Sarcham-e Olya Persian: سرچم عليا
- Village
- Location within Iran
- Coordinates: 37°08′46″N 47°58′05″E
- Country: Iran
- Province: Zanjan
- County: Zanjan
- District: Zanjanrud
- Rural District: Zanjanrud-e Pain

Population (2016)
  - Total: 21
- Time zone: UTC+3:30 (IRST)

Sarcham-e Olya (Persian: سر چم عليا) (Note: Also romanized as Sarcham-e ‘Olyā; also known as Sarcham-e Bālā) is a village in Zanjanrud-e Pain Rural District of Zanjanrud District in Zanjan County, Zanjan province, Iran.

== Demographics ==
=== Population ===
At the time of the 2006 National Census, the village's population was 103 in 26 households. The following census in 2011 counted 17 people in six households. The 2016 census measured the population of the village as 21 people in seven households.
