= Mir Jan =

Mir Jan may refer to:

- Mohamed Jawad
- Mirjan
