= Churuk =

Churuk (Persian: چوروك) may refer to:

- Churuk-e Olya
- Churuk-e Sofla
