= Qeytur, Zanjan =

Village in Zanjan province, Iran

Qeytur Persian: قيطور
- Village
- Location within Iran
- Coordinates: 37°04′34″N 48°07′23″E
- Country: Iran
- Province: Zanjan
- County: Zanjan
- District: Zanjanrud
- Rural District: Zanjanrud-e Pain

Population (2016)
  - Total: 90
- Time zone: UTC+3:30 (IRST)

Qeytur (Persian: قيطور) (Note: Also romanized as Qeyţūr; also known as Goytor, Koytur, Qaitur, and Qoyţūr) is a village in Zanjanrud-e Pain Rural District of Zanjanrud District in Zanjan County, Zanjan province, Iran.

== Demographics ==
=== Population ===
At the time of the 2006 National Census, the village's population was 151 in 29 households. The following census in 2011 counted 121 people in 25 households. The 2016 census measured the population of the village as 90 people in 25 households.
