= Sardehat-e Sheykh =

Village in Zanjan province, Iran

Sardehat-e Sheykh Persian: سر دهات شيخ
- Village
- Location within Iran
- Coordinates: 37°00′47″N 48°05′47″E
- Country: Iran
- Province: Zanjan
- County: Zanjan
- District: Zanjanrud
- Rural District: Zanjanrud-e Pain

Population (2016)
  - Total: 112
- Time zone: UTC+3:30 (IRST)

Sardehat-e Sheykh (Persian: سر دهات شيخ) (Note: Also romanized as Sardehāt-e Sheykh; also known as Sardahāt-e Bālā, Sardehāt, Sardehāt Sheykhestānlū, Sardehāt-e Sheykhlar, Sardehāt-e Sheykhlū, and Sardekhat) is a village in Zanjanrud-e Pain Rural District of Zanjanrud District in Zanjan County, Zanjan province, Iran.

== Demographics ==
=== Population ===
At the time of the 2006 National Census, the village's population was 219 in 60 households. The following census in 2011 counted 143 people in 45 households. The 2016 census measured the population of the village as 112 people in 37 households.
