= Sardehat-e Bayat Jafar =

Village in Zanjan province, Iran

Sardehat-e Bayat Jafar Persian: سردهات بيات جعفر
- Village
- Location within Iran
- Coordinates: 36°57′54″N 48°02′09″E
- Country: Iran
- Province: Zanjan
- County: Zanjan
- District: Zanjanrud
- Rural District: Zanjanrud-e Pain

Population (2016)
  - Total: 62
- Time zone: UTC+3:30 (IRST)

Sardehat-e Bayat Jafar (Persian: سردهات بيات جعفر) (Note: Also romanized as Sardehāt-e Bayāt Ja‘far; also known as Sardehāt, Sardehāt Ja‘far, Sardehāt-e Ja‘far, Sardehāt-e Pā’īn, and Sardekhat) is a village in Zanjanrud-e Pain Rural District of Zanjanrud District in Zanjan County, Zanjan province, Iran.

== Demographics ==
=== Population ===
At the time of the 2006 National Census, the village's population was 234 in 52 households. The following census in 2011 counted 176 people in 49 households. The 2016 census measured the population of the village as 62 people in 17 households.
