= Churuk-e Sofla =

Village in Zanjan province, Iran

Churuk-e Sofla Persian: چوروك سفلي
- Village
- Location within Iran
- Coordinates: 37°07′06″N 47°52′24″E
- Country: Iran
- Province: Zanjan
- County: Zanjan
- District: Zanjanrud
- Rural District: Zanjanrud-e Pain

Population (2016)
  - Total: 228
- Time zone: UTC+3:30 (IRST)

Churuk-e Sofla (Persian: چوروك سفلي) (Note: Also romanized as Chūrūk-e Soflá; also known as Chūrūk-e Pā’īn and Chūzak-e Soflá) is a village in Zanjanrud-e Pain Rural District of Zanjanrud District in Zanjan County, Zanjan province, Iran.

== Demographics ==
=== Population ===
At the time of the 2006 National Census, the village's population was 274 in 55 households. The following census in 2011 counted 233 people in 62 households. The 2016 census measured the population of the village as 228 people in 63 households.
