= Qarah Charyan =

Village in Zanjan province, Iran

Qarah Charyan Persian: قره چريان
- Village
- Location within Iran
- Coordinates: 36°53′18″N 48°15′50″E
- Country: Iran
- Province: Zanjan
- County: Zanjan
- District: Zanjanrud
- Rural District: Zanjanrud-e Pain

Population (2016)
  - Total: 359
- Time zone: UTC+3:30 (IRST)

Qarah Charyan (Persian: قره چريان) (Note: Also romanized as Qarah Charyān, Qareh Charyān, and Qareh Cheryān; also known as Ghareh Chariyan, Karachar, Qarachar, Qareh Jeryān, and Qarehchar) is a village in Zanjanrud-e Pain Rural District of Zanjanrud District in Zanjan County, Zanjan province, Iran.

== Demographics ==
=== Population ===
At the time of the 2006 National Census, the village's population was 417 in 97 households. The following census in 2011 counted 407 people in 110 households. The 2016 census measured the population of the village as 359 people in 108 households.
