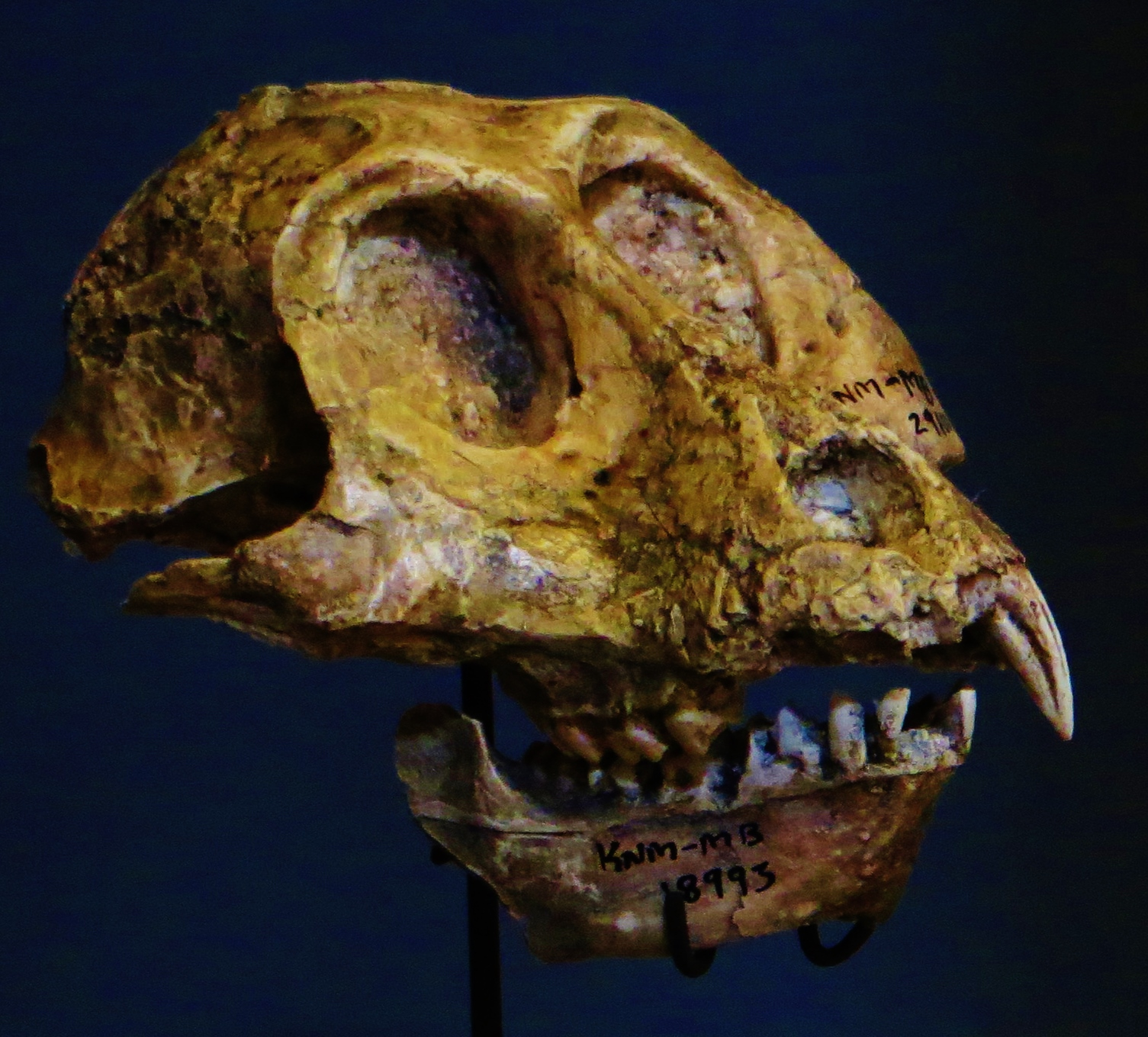
- Skull KNM-M13 18993

Scientific classification
- Kingdom: Animalia
- Phylum: Chordata
- Class: Mammalia
- Order: Primates
- Superfamily: Cercopithecoidea
- Family: †Victoriapithecidae
- Genus: †Victoriapithecus von Koenigswald, 1969
- Species: †V. macinnesi

Binomial name
- †Victoriapithecus macinnesi von Koenigswald, 1969

= Victoriapithecus =

Victoriapithecus Temporal range: 17–15 Million years ago

Extinct monkey from middle Miocene central Africa

Victoriapithecus macinnesi was a primate from the middle Miocene that lived approximately 17 to 15 million years ago in Northern and Eastern Africa. Through extensive field work on Maboko Island in Lake Victoria, Kenya, over 3,500 specimens have been found, making V. macinnesi one of the best-known fossil primates. It was previously thought that perhaps multiple species of Victoriapithecus were found, however the majority of fossils found indicate there is only one species, V. macinnesi. Victoriapithecus shows similarities to the extant subfamilies Colobinae and Cercopithecinae. However, Victoriapithecus predates the last common ancestor of these two groups and instead is thought to be a sister taxon.

== Etymology ==
Victoriapithecus gets its name from the location of its discovery, Lake Victoria in Kenya, and the Greek word for ape, -pithecus, a naming formula common for the genera of fossil apes.

The macinnesi part honours Donald Gordon MacInnes, a British palaeontologist and fossil collector. MacInnes gathered the first known specimens of this primate in the 1930s from sites in southwestern Kenya. The naming of the genus and species was done formally by palaeontologist G.H.R. von Koenigswald in 1969, based mainly on fossils from Maboko Island in Kenya where many specimens have been found. It is unusual that Koenigswald did not name the fossil after himself, but instead gave the honour to Donald MacInnes to recognise his contribution to the understanding of Miocene primates.

== Anatomy ==
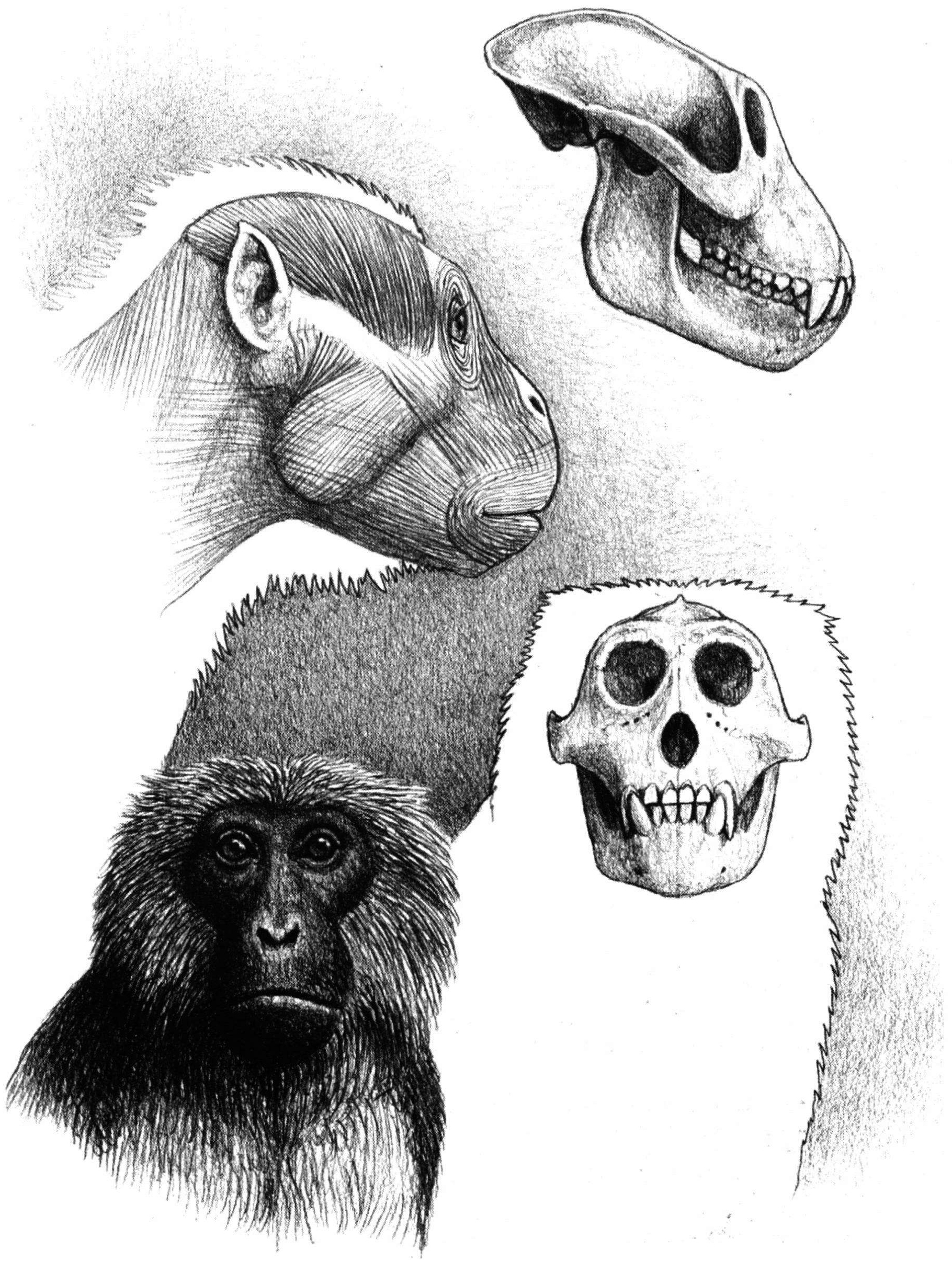
Restoration by Mauricio Antón

Victoriapithecus is the smallest of the known terrestrial anthropoids with a body mass of between 3 and 5 kg (6.6 and 11.0 lb).

Victoriapithecus had an upper and lower dental formula of 2:1:2:3. Unlike modern cercopithecids, which have bilophodont molars, Victoriapithecus had a more primitive molar structure and lacked the transverse distal loph.

Based on cranial casts the estimated that the endocranial volume of Fossil KNM-MB 29100, a 15 million year old specimen of Victoriapithecus, was around 35.6³, relatively small for a male of its size. Despite the smaller size, scans have found that Victoriapithecus’ brain was quite complex. Such findings provide insight into the evolution of complex brains suggesting that complexity came before larger size in early primates. Victoriapithecus also had large anteriorly projecting olfactory bulbs which served as the only source of detection for olfactory stimuli as they lacked the vomeronasal organ found in many other primates.

Victoriapithecus had a well-developed sagittal crest, suggesting a dependence on heavy chewing. Tall and narrow orbits, narrow nasal bones and relatively tall zygomatic arches, as well as a moderately long muzzle and mid facial region, are similar to extant cercopithecine monkeys. Post-cranial skeleton - A divergent and opposable big toe allowed for increased agility when climbing in trees, yet the general limb morphology also suggests effective movement terrestrially.

The enlarged canine size of Victoriapithecus suggests a degree of sexual dimorphism similar to extant primates. Sexual dimorphism was also present in overall size of Victoriapithecus, with males on average being between 4–5 kg (8.8–11.0 lb) and females being around 3 kg (6.6 lb).

== Environment and Behavior ==
V. macinnesi lived primarily in semi-arid woodlands, grass patches and woodlands. Evidence points to a highly frugivorous diet, though some leaf and seed consumption was probable. Their ability to adapt to seasonally changing food sources near to the ground allowed them to have greater survival as the climate became more seasonal in Eastern Africa.

Sexual dimorphic characteristics suggest that, like many extant primates, Victoriapithecus lived in multiple-male groups where competition and desire for dominance is high. The high presence of young adult male fossils found in Bed 5 on Maboko Island likely indicates that males migrated out of their birth groups and, due to competition or lack of communal support, were more likely to die at puberty.

Victoriapithecus were quadrupedal and adapted to terrestrial life. However, they did retain some arboreal features that aided in branch running and walking on large diameter arboreal supports. The ability to live arboreally and terrestrially allowed Victoriapithecus to exploit a wider range of resources.
