= Zanjanrud-e Pain Rural District =

Rural district in Zanjan province, Iran

Zanjanrud-e Pain Rural District Persian: دهستان زنجانرود پائين
- Rural District
- Location within Iran
- Coordinates: 36°56′N 48°10′E
- Country: Iran
- Province: Zanjan
- County: Zanjan
- District: Zanjanrud
- Established: 1987
- Capital: Nik Pey

Population (2016)
  - Total: 8,348
- Time zone: UTC+3:30 (IRST)

Zanjanrud-e Pain Rural District (Persian: دهستان زنجانرود پائين) is in Zanjanrud District of Zanjan County, Zanjan province, Iran. It is administered from the city of Nik Pey.

== Demographics ==
=== Population ===
At the time of the 2006 National Census, the rural district's population was 11,686 in 2,801 households. There were 10,302 inhabitants in 2,855 households at the following census of 2011. The 2016 census measured the population of the rural district as 8,348 in 2,611 households. The most populous of its 55 villages was Rajin, with 1,640 people.

=== Other villages in the rural district ===
- Almalu
- Alvarlu
- Arabcheh
- Baghlujeh-ye Aqa
- Baghlujeh-ye Sardar
- Bolugh
- Chap Chap
- Chavor
- Churuk-e Sofla
- Dalaki
- Darreh Lik
- Dulak
- Dulanab
- Esfanaj
- Fileh Khasseh
- Gomeshabad
- Govalan
- Hammamlu-e Bala
- Hammamlu-e Pain
- Hasanabad
- Kahab
- Kazbar
- Qaheran
- Qalaychi
- Qarah Charyan
- Qareh Aghaj
- Qareh Aqajlu
- Qeytur
- Quli Qaseh
- Sarcham-e Olya
- Sarcham-e Sofla
- Sardehat-e Bayat Jafar
- Sardehat-e Sheykh
- Seyfabad
- Talkhab
- Tazeh Kand
