= Nik Pey =

City in Zanjan province, Iran

Nik Pey Persian: نیک‌پی
- City
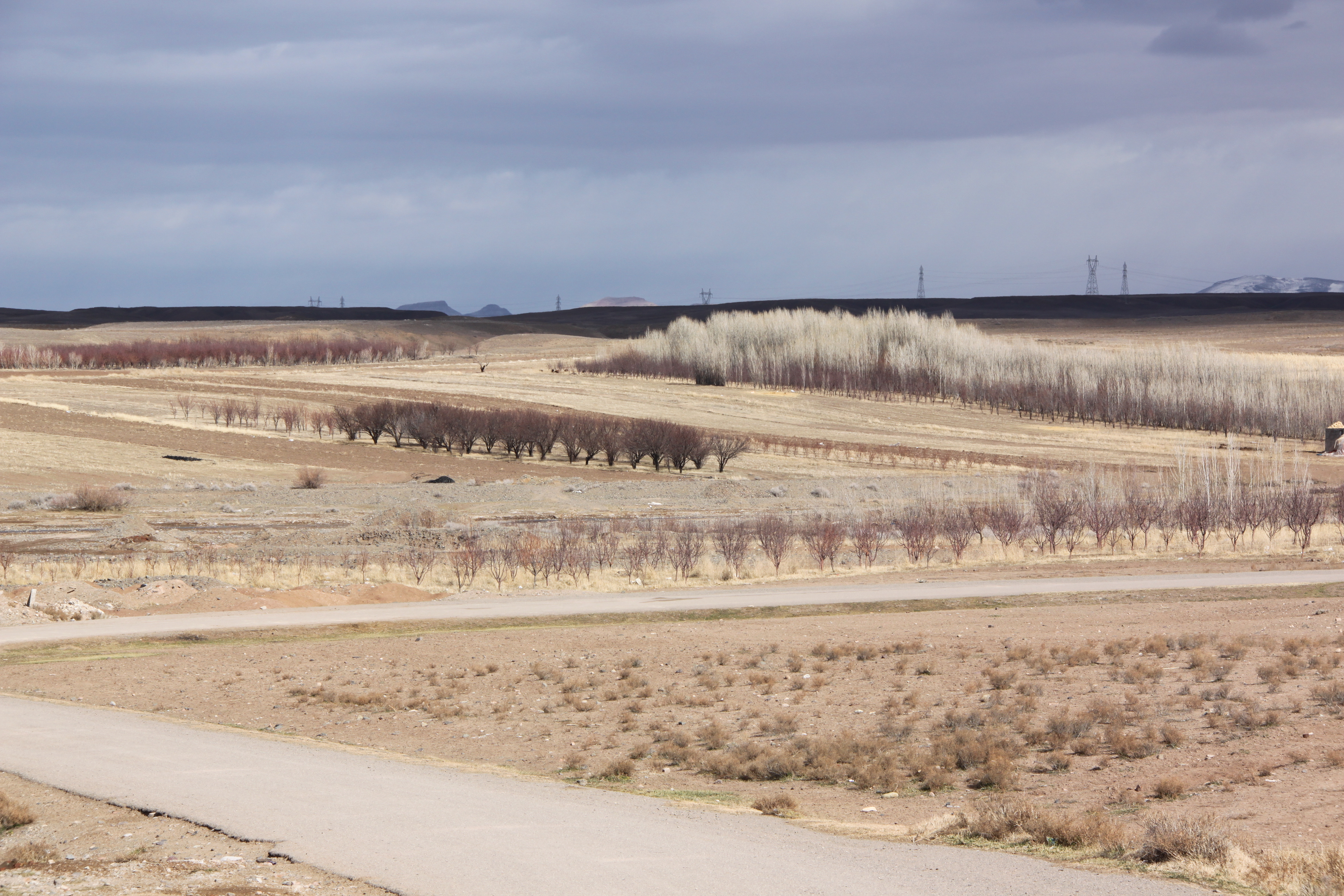
- The area around the caravanserai of Nik Pey

- Location within Iran
- Coordinates: 36°51′01″N 48°10′43″E
- Country: Iran
- Province: Zanjan
- County: Zanjan
- District: Zanjanrud
- Established: 2011

Population (2016)
  - Total: 455
- Time zone: UTC+3:30 (IRST)

Nik Pey (Persian: نیک‌پی) (Note: Also romanized as Nīk Pey) is a city in, and the capital of, Zanjanrud District in Zanjan County, Zanjan province, Iran. It also serves as the administrative center for Zanjanrud-e Pain Rural District.

== Demographics ==
=== Population ===
At the time of the 2006 National Census, Nik Pey's population was 427 in 119 households, when it was a village in Zanjanrud-e Pain Rural District. The following census in 2011 counted 474 people in 122 households. The 2016 census measured the population as 455 people in 115 households, by which time the village had been converted to a city.
