= Ghanibeyglu Rural District =

Rural district in Zanjan province, Iran

Ghanibeyglu Rural District Persian: دهستان غني بيگلو
- Rural District
- Location within Iran
- Coordinates: 36°48′30″N 47°53′00″E
- Country: Iran
- Province: Zanjan
- County: Zanjan
- District: Zanjanrud
- Established: 1987
- Capital: Andabad-e Olya

Population (2016)
  - Total: 6,674
- Time zone: UTC+3:30 (IRST)

Ghanibeyglu Rural District (Persian: دهستان غني بيگلو) is in Zanjanrud District of Zanjan County, Zanjan province, Iran. Its capital is the village of Andabad-e Olya.

== Demographics ==
=== Population ===
At the time of the 2006 National Census, the rural district's population was 9,629 in 2,326 households. There were 8,413 inhabitants in 2,358 households at the following census of 2011. The 2016 census measured the population of the rural district as 6,674 in 2,057 households. The most populous of its 34 villages was Mirjan, with 1,270 people.

=== Other villages in the rural district ===
- Aliabad
- Andabad-e Sofla
- Arbat
- Bozusha
- Chehrehabad
- Cherlanqush
- Degerman Daresi
- Ebrahimabad
- Habash
- Hamzehlu
- Hoseynabad
- Kangarlu
- Lulekabad
- Malek Baghi
- Mehrabad
- Mian Darreh
- Minan
- Nasirabad
- Owzaj
- Qalicheh Bolagh
- Qarah Kul
- Qezeljeh-ye Sofla
- Qezlar Bolaghi
- Rezaabad
- Sangabin
- Taqi Kandi
- Zangin
