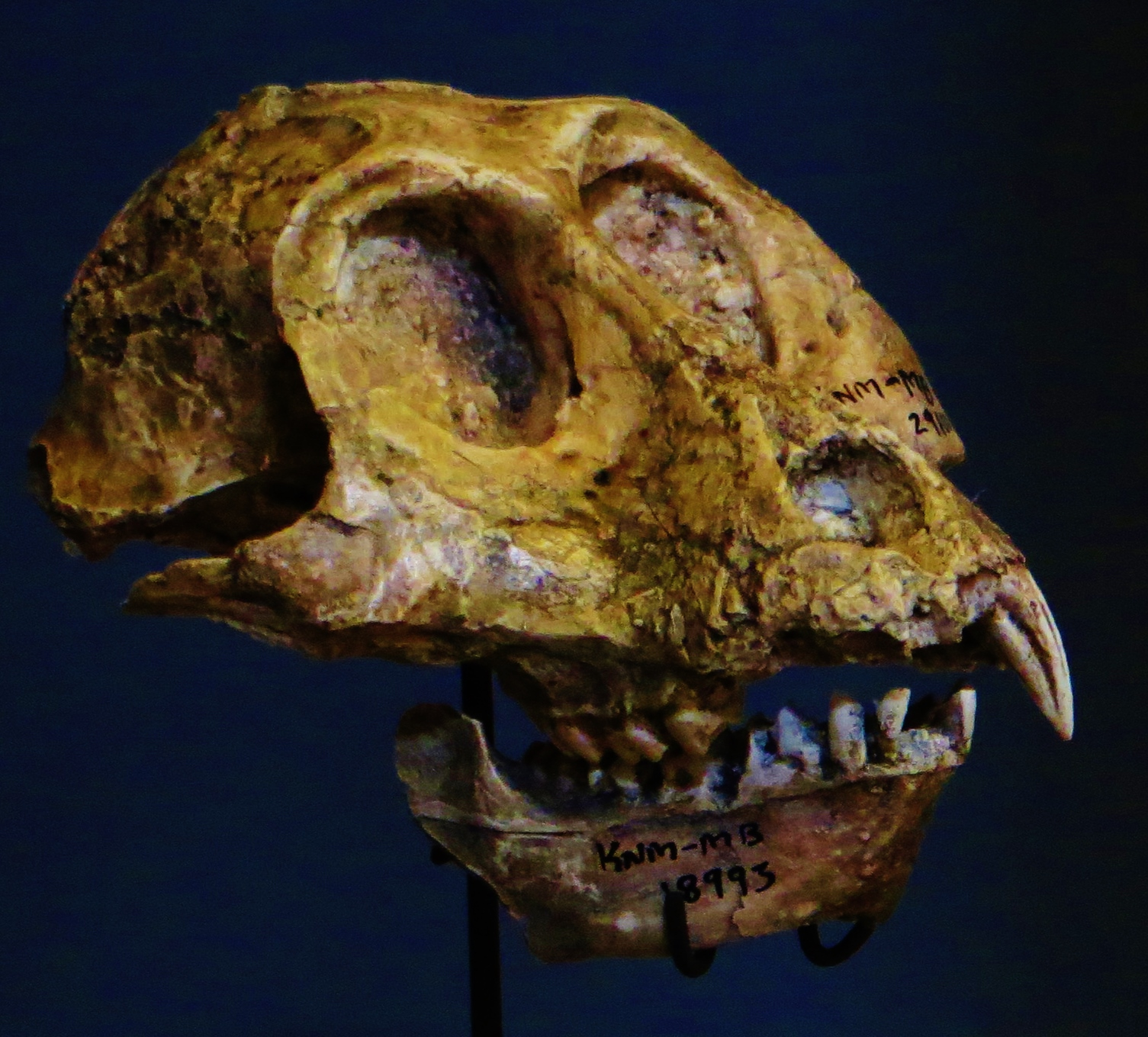
- Skull of Victoriapithecus, the most documented genus

Scientific classification
- Kingdom: Animalia
- Phylum: Chordata
- Class: Mammalia
- Order: Primates
- Superfamily: Cercopithecoidea
- Family: †Victoriapithecidae; Von Koenigswald, 1969

Genera
- †Victoriapithecus Von Koenigswald, 1969; †Prohylobates René Fourtau, 1918; †Noropithecus Ellen R. Miller et al., 2009; †Zaltanpithecus Eric Delson, 1969

= Victoriapithecidae =

Victoriapithecidae Temporal range: Miocene, 20-12.5 Ma

Extinct family of Old World monkeys

Victoriapithecidae is an extinct family of Old World monkeys that lived in northern and eastern Africa, approximately 20 to 12.5 million years ago during the Miocene. They are thought to be one of the earliest members of the Cercopithecoidea.

The family includes Victoriapithecus, Prohylobates, Noropithecus and Zaltanpithecus. Most of the genera are known from jaws and teeth, though Victoriapithecus is represented by a much larger fossil sample.

== Etymology ==
'Victoria-' comes from Lake Victoria in Kenya, where Victoriapithecus was discovered, '-pithecidae' comes from the Greek for Ape, with the addition of '-idae', a suffix for families in taxonomy.

== Description ==
Their dentition have incomplete development of bilophodonty in both the upper or lower molars. The fourth lower premolar (p4) is oblique relative to the cheek tooth row. Their molars generally shows basal flare, a condition in which the cusps are positioned relatively close together compared with the overall width of the tooth crown.

The dental morphology varies considerably between genera. Prohylobates tandyi, for example, retains incomplete bilophodonty in its lower molars. This condition distinguishes it from other victoriapithecids with more completely developed bilophodont molars.

Noropithecus bulukensis, in contrast, possesses fully bilophodont lower molars and a distinctive mandibular symphysis. Zaltanpithecus simonsi is particularly unusual in having considerably larger teeth and a more robust mandible than other members of the family.

== Paleobiology ==
The postcranial remains of Victoriapithecus suggest that at least some victoriapithecids were agile quadrupedal animals capable of moving both on the ground and in trees. Harrison (1989) described Victoriapithecus as an active quadruped with adaptations for movement in both arboreal and terrestrial environments, resembling modern semi-terrestrial Old World monkeys.

Body mass estimates are available primarily for Victoriapithecus macinnesi and vary according to the anatomical material and estimation methods used. Harrison estimated an average body mass of approximately 3.5–4 kg from postcranial remains. A 2015 study used a estimate of 5–7 kg for a large adult male specimen, KNM-MB 29100.

=== Diet ===
Victoriapithecids were primarily frugivores and folivores, meaning they ate fruits and leaves most of the time. This is known because their dental microwear is similar to that of extant folivore primates, such as Theropithecus and Trachypithecus.

== Distribution and age ==
Victoriapithecid fossils have been recovered from several localities in northern and eastern Africa. These include Wadi Moghra in Egypt, Jabal Zaltan in Libya, and numerous sites in Kenya and Uganda. Their known occurrences extend from the Early to the Middle Miocene.

In Egypt, Prohylobates tandyi is known from Wadi Moghra, an Early Miocene locality dated to approximately 18–17 million years ago. In Libya, Zaltanpithecus simonsi is known from Jabal Zaltan. Kenyan localities have yielded fossils of several genera, including Victoriapithecus from Maboko Island, Loperot, Nachola and other sites, and Noropithecus from Buluk. Additional remains attributed to Victoriapithecus have been recovered from Napak and Moroto in Uganda.

== Taxonomic history ==
The classification of Victoriapithecidae have been the subject of discussion because its members have a varying amount of fossils. Although Victoriapithecus is known from a large sample, most other genera are represented by considerably fewer specimens.

One of the main difficulties concerns the distinction between Prohylobates and Victoriapithecus. Earlier studies assigned some specimens from Moroto, Uganda, to Prohylobates macinnesi, partly because clear anatomical features distinguishing the two genera had not yet been established. Miller et al. found differences in morphology that supported them as separate genera. The Moroto specimens previously attributed to Prohylobates macinnesi were assigned to Victoriapithecus.

Another change involved Zaltanpithecus simonsi, which was originally described as Prohylobates simonsi. The specimen from Jabal Zaltan, Libya, was later assigned to a separate genus by Benefit (2008). Its large mandible and teeth distinguish it from other victoriapithecids. However, its classification remains based on only a single partial mandibular specimen.

The establishment of Noropithecus also contributed to revisions of the family. Material from Buluk, Kenya, had previously been assigned to Prohylobates or left unidentified. Miller et al. (2009) recognized a distinct combination of dental and mandibular features, including fully bilophodont lower molars and a steeply inclined mandibular symphysis, supporting the recognition of a separate genus.

Locke et al. (2020) described additional dental and mandibular specimens from Buluk, allowing a more extensive comparison with Victoriapithecus macinnesi. Their study found differences in aspects of the incisors, canines, premolars and molars, but also documented variation. Some previously proposed diagnostic features, such as the shape of the upper dental arcade, were found to be unreliable for distinguishing the two genera.

=== Possible paraphyly ===
The monophyly of Victoriapithecidae has also been questioned. The incomplete bilophodonty of Prohylobates tandyi is particularly relevant to this issue. It has been proposed that Prohylobates may have diverged before other victoriapithecids and the more derived cercopithecoids, potentially making the traditional family paraphyletic. Other members, including Victoriapithecus, Noropithecus and Zaltanpithecus, may occupy different positions among early cercopithecoid lineages.

Miller et al. nevertheless retained Victoriapithecidae as a distinct family, arguing that dividing its members into several separate families would create an unnecessarily unstable classification. Later phylogenetic analyses, including those discussed by Rasmussen et al. (2019) and de Vries and Beck (2023), have continued to treat the traditional victoriapithecid assemblage as potentially paraphyletic.

=== Nsungwepithecus ===
Nsungwepithecus gunnelli, an early fossil cercopithecoid from the late Oligocene of Tanzania, shares some lower molar characteristics with victoriapithecids, including a pronounced buccal flare and deeply incised buccal clefts. However, its precise phylogenetic position remains uncertain because it is known from very limited fossil material. Rasmussen et al. (2019) regarded it as a stem cercopithecoid, while de Vries and Beck (2023) discussed it as an early representative of the cercopithecoid lineage.
