= Anjuman-i-Khurd =

- Location in Afghanistan
- Coordinates: 35°53′N 70°25′E
- Country: Afghanistan
- Province: Badakhshan Province
- District: Kuran wa Munjan

Anjuman-i-Khurd is a village in Afghanistan. It lies within the Anjuman Valley, about 18 miles from the mouth of the valley. Another village, Anjuman, lies close by. Around the turn of the 20th century, the village had 30 occupied residences, primarily Tajiks. The grazing in the area was good, and the inhabitants were a peaceful lot, and relatively poorly armed. Khurd and Kalan are Persian language words which mean small and big respectively. When two villages have the same name then they are distinguished by adding Kalan (big) and Khurd (small) at the end of the village name, based on their size relative to each other.
