= Sar Cham, Kurdistan =

Sar Cham سرچم
- Village
- Location within Iran
- Coordinates: 34°45′37″N 46°51′57″E
- Country: Iran
- Province: Kurdistan
- County: Kamyaran
- Bakhsh: Central
- Rural District: Shahu

Population (2006)
  - Total: 120
- Time zone: UTC+3:30 (IRST)
  - Summer (DST): UTC+4:30 (IRDT)

Sar Cham (Persian: سرچم; also known as Sar Chashm, Sar Chashmeh, and Sar Cheshmeh) is a village in Shahu Rural District, in the Central District of Kamyaran County, Kurdistan Province, Iran. At the 2006 census, its population was 120, in 29 families. The village is populated by Kurds.
