= Taqi Kandi, East Azerbaijan =

Taqi Kandi تقي كندي
- Village
- Location within Iran
- Coordinates: 38°50′27″N 47°27′29″E
- Country: Iran
- Province: East Azerbaijan
- County: Ahar
- Bakhsh: Hurand
- Rural District: Dodangeh

Population (2006)
  - Total: 24
- Time zone: UTC+3:30 (IRST)
  - Summer (DST): UTC+4:30 (IRDT)

Taqi Kandi (Persian: تقي كندي, also Romanized as Taqī Kandī) is a village in Dodangeh Rural District, Hurand District, Ahar County, East Azerbaijan Province, Iran. At the 2006 census, its population was 24, in 9 families.
