= Baghlujeh, West Azerbaijan =

Baghlujeh باغلوجه
- Village
- Location within Iran
- Coordinates: 36°38′47″N 46°40′35″E
- Country: Iran
- Province: West Azerbaijan
- County: Shahin Dezh
- Bakhsh: Central
- Rural District: Hulasu

Population (2006)
  - Total: 101
- Time zone: UTC+3:30 (IRST)
  - Summer (DST): UTC+4:30 (IRDT)

Baghlujeh (Persian: باغلوجه, also Romanized as Bāghlūjeh) is a village in Hulasu Rural District, in the Central District of Shahin Dezh County, West Azerbaijan Province, Iran. At the 2006 census, its population was 101, in 22 families.
