= Chaypareh-ye Pain Rural District =

Rural district in Zanjan province, Iran

Chaypareh-ye Pain Rural District Persian: دهستان چايپاره پائين
- Rural District
- Location within Iran
- Coordinates: 36°59′N 47°37′E
- Country: Iran
- Province: Zanjan
- County: Zanjan
- District: Zanjarud
- Established: 1987
- Capital: Hesar

Population (2016)
  - Total: 3,797
- Time zone: UTC+3:30 (IRST)

Chaypareh-ye Pain Rural District (Persian: دهستان چايپاره پائين) is in Zanjanrud District of Zanjan County, Zanjan province, Iran. Its capital is the village of Hesar.

== Demographics ==
=== Population ===
At the time of the 2006 National Census, the rural district's population was 4,732 in 1,043 households. There were 4,178 inhabitants in 1,065 households at the following census of 2011. The 2016 census measured the population of the rural district as 3,797 in 1,086 households. The most populous of its 13 villages was Moshampa, with 1,203 people.

=== Other villages in the rural district ===
- Anjoman-e Olya
- Anjoman-e Sofla
- Chapar
- Iljaq
- Nowruzabad
- Qarah Aghaj-e Olya
- Qarah Aghaj-e Sofla
- Sari Kand-e Kabali
- Sari Kand-e Olya
- Shokurchi
