= Anjuman (stream) =

- Location of mouth

Location
- Country: Afghanistan

Physical characteristics
- Source
  - location: Anjuman Valley
- Mouth
  - coordinates: 35°25′N 69°43′E

The Anjuman is a stream which runs through the Anjuman Valley in Afghanistan. The stream's sources include the three lakes of the valley, with the largest lake being the primary source.
