= Arvand, Iran =

Arvand اروند
- Village
- Location within Iran
- Coordinates: 36°22′50″N 59°34′53″E
- Country: Iran
- Province: Razavi Khorasan
- County: Mashhad
- Bakhsh: Central
- Rural District: Tus

Population (2006)
  - Total: 179
- Time zone: UTC+3:30 (IRST)
  - Summer (DST): UTC+4:30 (IRDT)

Arvand (Persian: اروند; also known as Arband) is a village in Tus Rural District, in the Central District of Mashhad County, Razavi Khorasan Province, Iran. At the 2006 census, its population was 179, in 48 families.

== See also ==
- List of cities, towns and villages in Razavi Khorasan Province
