= Anjuman Valley =

Valley in Afghanistan

The Anjuman Valley is a valley in Afghanistan. It connects to the Munjan valley some twelve miles above Sari Sang, and is drained by the Anjuman stream.

The valley is passable by mules, although the descent into the valley is impossible for camels to pass. There are two villages in the valley, Anjuman and Anjuman-i-Khurd, both some eighteen miles from the mouth of the valley. Another village, Scarsap, is situated in a branch valley about 14 miles from the mouth of the Anjuman valley. The grazing in the valley is good.

The valley as a whole was within the territory of the hakim of Munjan, and the pass formed the boundary between Badakhshan Province and Kabul Province.
