= Anjuman, Afghanistan =

Anjuman
- Location in Afghanistan
- Coordinates: 35°53′N 70°25′E
- Country: Afghanistan
- Province: Badakhshan
- District: Kuran wa Munjan
- Elevation: 10,040 ft (3,060 m)

Anjuman (Persian: انجمن Anjoman), also written Anjoman, is the name of a village in Badakhshan Province, Afghanistan. It lies within the Anjuman Valley, about 18 miles from the mouth of the valley. Another village, Anjuman-i-Khurd, lies close by. Around the turn of the 21st century, the village had 90 occupied residences, primarily Tajiks. The grazing in the area was good, and the inhabitants were a peaceful lot, and relatively poorly armed.

The village is located on the scenic Anjuman Pass, which connects Badakhshan to the Panjshir Valley in the south. Each year cattle are herded through Anjuman from the high plains of Badakhshan Province down to the south.

== Climate ==
Because of its high altitude, Anjuman enjoys an alpine tundra climate (Köppen climate classification: ET) with short, pleasant summers and long, cold winters. The village lies in the discontinuous permafrost zone, as the average annual temperature reaches −3.2 °C (26.2 °F).

Climate data for Anjuman, Badakhshan Province (Extremes 2009-present)
| Month | Jan | Feb | Mar | Apr | May | Jun | Jul | Aug | Sep | Oct | Nov | Dec | Year |
|---|---|---|---|---|---|---|---|---|---|---|---|---|---|
| Record high °C (°F) | 3 (37) | 4 (39) | 7 (45) | 13 (55) | 17 (63) | 20 (68) | — | — | — | — | — | — | 20 (68) |
| Mean daily maximum °C (°F) | −6.7 (19.9) | −5.6 (21.9) | −1.7 (28.9) | 2.2 (36.0) | 6.7 (44.1) | 11.1 (52.0) | 14.4 (57.9) | 14.4 (57.9) | 11.7 (53.1) | 5.0 (41.0) | −1.1 (30.0) | −5.0 (23.0) | 3.8 (38.8) |
| Daily mean °C (°F) | −14.8 (5.4) | −13.4 (7.9) | −9.2 (15.4) | −4.5 (23.9) | 0.3 (32.5) | 4.8 (40.6) | 8.1 (46.6) | 7.5 (45.5) | 4.5 (40.1) | −1.4 (29.5) | −7.8 (18.0) | −12.2 (10.0) | −3.2 (26.3) |
| Mean daily minimum °C (°F) | −22.8 (−9.0) | −21.1 (−6.0) | −16.7 (1.9) | −11.1 (12.0) | −6.1 (21.0) | −1.6 (29.1) | 1.7 (35.1) | 0.6 (33.1) | −2.8 (27.0) | −7.8 (18.0) | −14.4 (6.1) | −19.4 (−2.9) | −10.1 (13.8) |
| Record low °C (°F) | −40 (−40) | −39 (−38) | −35 (−31) | −31 (−24) | −21 (−6) | −13 (9) | — | — | — | — | — | — | −40 (−40) |
| Average precipitation mm (inches) | 65.8 (2.59) | 116.4 (4.58) | 145.3 (5.72) | 165.4 (6.51) | 150.8 (5.94) | 65.7 (2.59) | 20.9 (0.82) | 15.6 (0.61) | 22.7 (0.89) | 58.0 (2.28) | 61.9 (2.44) | 44.5 (1.75) | 933 (36.72) |
| Average relative humidity (%) | 71 | 75 | 78 | 76 | 70 | 59 | 47 | 44 | 40 | 52 | 63 | 65 | 62 |
Source: World Weather Online
