= Dental microwear =

Material analysis method in palaeontology

In palaeontology, dental microwear analysis is a method to infer diet and behaviour in extinct animals, especially in fossil specimens. Typically, the patterns of pits and scratches on the occlusal or buccal surface of the enamel are compared with patterns observed in extant species to infer ecological information. Hard foods in particular can lead to distinctive patterns (although see below). Microwear can also be used for inferring behavior, especially those related to the non-masticatory use of teeth as 'tools'. Other uses include investigating weaning in past populations. Methods used to collect data initially involved a microscope and manually collecting information on individual microwear features, but software to automatically collect data have improved markedly in recent years.

This method has been used on a variety of taxa, including:

- Hominids
- Victoriapithecids
- Cercopithecids
- Pliopithecids
- Propliopithecids
- Homunculids
- Parapithecids
- Djebelemurids
- Carpolestids
- Palaeolagids
- Murids
- Nesomyids
- Sciurids
- Glirids
- Castorids
- Amphicyonids
- Canids
- Ursids
- Nandiniids
- Felids
- Viverrids
- Hyaenids
- Hyaenodontids
- Equids
- Palaeotheriids
- Rhinocerotids
- Tapirids
- Lophialetids
- Lophiodontids
- Chalicotheriids
- Toxodontids
- Hegetotheriids
- Interatheriids
- Macraucheniids
- Proterotheriids
- Cebochoerids
- Camelids
- Merycoidontids
- Suids
- Tayassuids
- Entelodontids
- Hippopotamids
- Pakicetids
- Antilocaprids
- Dromomerycids
- Cervids
- Bovids
- Moschids
- Tragulids
- Palaeomerycids
- Giraffids
- Mesonychids
- Megalocnids
- Mylodontids
- Megalonychids
- Megatheriids
- Nothrotheriids
- Deinotheriids
- Mammutids
- Choerolophodontids
- Stegodontids
- Elephantids
- Pliohyracids
- Macropodids
- Diprotodontids
- Palorchestids
- Thylacosmilids
- Stagodontids
- Ptilodontids
- Paulchoffatiids
- Shenshouids
- Tritylodontids
- Traversodontids
- Herrerasaurids
- Tyrannosaurids
- Allosaurids
- Abelisaurids
- Mamenchisaurids
- Turiasaurs
- Diplodocids
- Rebbachisaurids
- Camarasaurids
- Brachiosaurids
- Euhelopodids
- Silesaurids
- Thescelosaurids
- Rhabdodontids
- Dryosaurids
- Hadrosaurids
- Leptoceratopsids
- Ceratopsids
- Nodosaurids
- Ankylosaurids
- Metriorhynchids
- Trilophosaurids
- Varanids
- Mosasaurids
- Polyglyphanodontids
- Elasmobranchs
- Edestids
- Idiognathodontids

== Potential issues and on-going debates ==
- The role of phytoliths and environmental grit in creating microwear features is not well understood and recent research suggests such items may create a surprisingly large amount of the microwear features visible in fossil samples, which might serve as indicators of aridity and open environments.
- A recent study suggests hard food, or at least some types, may not contribute significantly to microwear textures.
- Occlusal dental microwear is rapidly turned over during life and therefore may only give information about the last few days of an individual's life. In particular, this 'last supper' effect may create a severely biased sample. This is why many researchers have focused on studying the striations on the buccal surfaces of teeth that present a life.
- Dental microwear in fossils may in some cases be influenced and altered by taphonomy, requiring norming data to eliminate possible erroneous conclusions caused by taphonomic effects
