= Qarah Char =

Qarah Char قره چر
- Village
- Location within Iran
- Coordinates: 36°06′31″N 46°05′16″E
- Country: Iran
- Province: Kurdistan
- County: Saqqez
- Bakhsh: Central
- Rural District: Mir Deh

Population (2006)
  - Total: 180
- Time zone: UTC+3:30 (IRST)
  - Summer (DST): UTC+4:30 (IRDT)

Qarah Char (Persian: قره چر) is a village in Mir Deh Rural District, in the Central District of Saqqez County, Kurdistan Province, Iran. At the 2006 census, its population was 180, in 41 families. The village is populated by Kurds.
