= Zanjanrud District =

District in Zanjan province, Iran

Zanjanrud District Persian: بخش زنجانرود
- District
- Location within Iran
- Coordinates: 36°55′N 47°52′E
- Country: Iran
- Province: Zanjan
- County: Zanjan
- Capital: Nik Pey

Population (2016)
  - Total: 23,307
- Time zone: UTC+3:30 (IRST)

Zanjanrud District (Persian: بخش زنجانرود) is in Zanjan County, Zanjan province, Iran. Its capital is the city of Nik Pey.

== History ==
The village of Nik Pey was converted to a city in 2011.

== Demographics ==
=== Population ===
At the time of the 2006 National Census, the district's population was 30,426 in 7,235 households. The following census in 2011 counted 27,055 people in 7,488 households. The 2016 census measured the population of the district as 23,307 inhabitants in 7,086 households.

=== Administrative divisions ===
Zanjanrud District Population
Administrative Divisions	2006	2011	2016
Chaypareh-ye Bala RD	4,379	4,162	4,033
Chaypareh-ye Pain RD	4,732	4,178	3,797
Ghanibeyglu RD	9,629	8,413	6,674
Zanjanrud-e Pain RD	11,686	10,302	8,348
Nik Pey (city)			455
Total	30,426	27,055	23,307
RD = Rural District
