= Zanjan County =

County in Zanjan province, Iran

Zanjan County Persian: شهرستان زنجان
- County
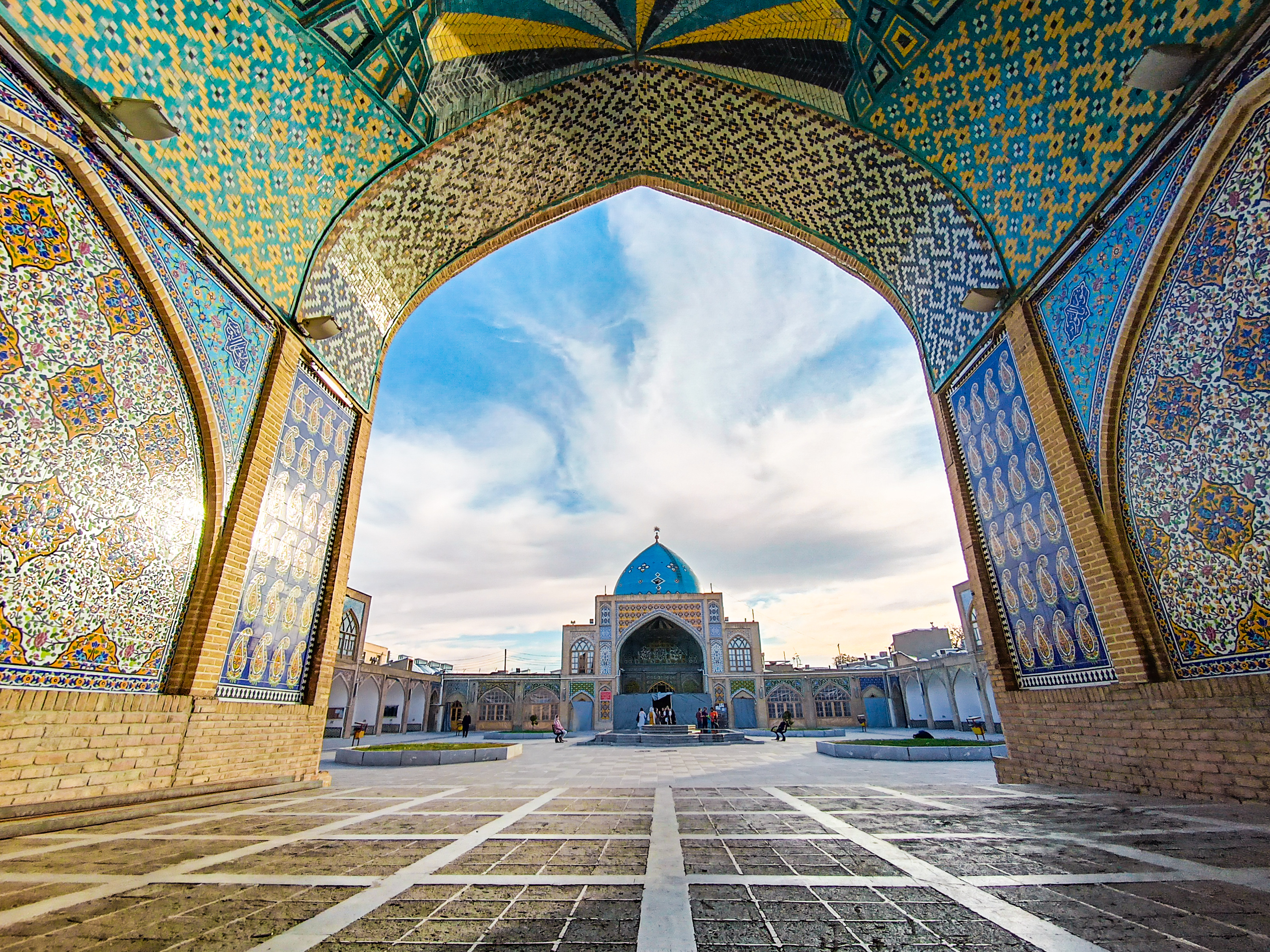
- Jeme'h Mosque of Zanjan

- Location of Zanjan County in Zanjan province (top, green)

- Location of Zanjan province in Iran
- Coordinates: 36°51′N 48°10′E
- Country: Iran
- Province: Zanjan
- Capital: Zanjan
- Districts: Central, Qareh Poshtelu, Zanjanrud

Population (2016)
  - Total: 521,302
- Time zone: UTC+3:30 (IRST)

Zanjan County (Persian: شهرستان زنجان) is in Zanjan province, Iran. Its capital is the city of Zanjan.

== History ==
The village of Armaghankhaneh was converted to a city in 2008, and the village of Nik Pey became a city in 2011. Soharin Rural District was created in Qareh Poshtelu District in 2013.

== Demographics ==
=== Population ===
At the time of the 2006 National Census, the Zanjan County's population was 442,728 in 113,883 households. The following census in 2011 counted 486,495 people in 137,832 households. The 2016 census measured the population of the county as 521,302 in 159,020 households.

=== Administrative divisions ===
Zanjan County's population history and administrative structure over three consecutive censuses are shown in the following table.

Zanjan County Population
Administrative Divisions	2006	2011	2016
Central District	395,149	442,924	482,025
Bonab RD	11,782	13,665	14,146
Bughda Kandi RD	8,586	8,442	7,133
Mojezat RD	12,448	12,247	10,195
Qoltuq RD (Note: Formerly Saidabad Rural District)	5,284	4,632	3,530
Taham RD	3,336	3,555	2,578
Zanjanrud-e Bala RD	11,912	13,532	13,572
Zanjan (city)	341,801	386,851	430,871
Qareh Poshtelu District	17,153	16,516	15,969
Qareh Poshtelu-e Bala RD	13,915	11,917	5,147
Qareh Poshtelu-e Pain RD	3,238	2,654	2,324
Soharin RD			6,349
Armaghankhaneh (city)		1,945	2,149
Zanjanrud District	30,426	27,055	23,307
Chaypareh-ye Bala RD	4,379	4,162	4,033
Chaypareh-ye Pain RD	4,732	4,178	3,797
Ghanibeyglu RD	9,629	8,413	6,674
Zanjanrud-e Pain RD	11,686	10,302	8,348
Nik Pey (city)			455
Total	442,728	486,495	521,302
RD = Rural District

== See also ==
Media related to Zanjan County at Wikimedia Commons
