= Aghcheh =

Aghcheh (Persian: اغچه), also rendered as Aghjeh and Aqjeh, may refer to various places in Iran:

- Aghcheh, Isfahan
- Aghcheh, Kerman
- Aghcheh Bolagh
- Aghcheh Bughaz
- Aghcheh Darband
- Aghcheh Dizaj (disambiguation)
- Aghjeh Dizaj (disambiguation)
- Aqcheh Qaleh (disambiguation)
- Aghcheh Hesar
- Aghcheh Kandi
- Aghcheh Kohel (disambiguation)
- Aghcheh Kohol
- Aghcheh Mashhad (disambiguation)
- Aghcheh Mazar
- Aghcheh Qaleh
- Aghcheh Qayah
- Aghcheh Qeshlaq (disambiguation)
- Aghcheh Rish (disambiguation)
- Aghcheh Rud
- Aghcheh Ziveh

== See also ==
- Aghjeh, Iran
- Aqcheh (disambiguation), various places in Iran
