= Babuneh =

Babuneh (Persian: بابونه) may refer to:

- Babuneh-ye Olya, East Azerbaijan Province
- Babuneh-ye Sofla, East Azerbaijan Province
- Babuneh-ye Vosta, East Azerbaijan Province
- Babuneh, Kohgiluyeh and Boyer-Ahmad
