= Qarah Gonay =

Qarah Gonay or Qareh Gonay (Persian: قره گناي), also rendered as Qarah Guni or Qareh Guney, may refer to:

- Qarah Gonay-e Olya
- Qarah Gonay-e Sofla
- Qarah Gonay-e Vosta

== See also ==
- Qareh Guni (disambiguation)
