= Vananaq =

Village in Zanjan province, Iran

Vananaq Persian: وننق
- Village
- Location within Iran
- Coordinates: 36°55′59″N 48°24′37″E
- Country: Iran
- Province: Zanjan
- County: Zanjan
- District: Qareh Poshtelu
- Rural District: Soharin

Population (2016)
  - Total: 849
- Time zone: UTC+3:30 (IRST)

Vananaq (Persian: وننق) (Note: Also known as Vanana and Vanehnīq) is a village in Soharin Rural District of Qareh Poshtelu District in Zanjan County, Zanjan province, Iran.

== Demographics ==
=== Population ===
At the time of the 2006 National Census, the village's population was 781 in 179 households, when it was in Qareh Poshtelu-e Bala Rural District. The following census in 2011 counted 862 people in 253 households. The 2016 census measured the population of the village as 849 people in 253 households, by which time it had been transferred to Soharin Rural District created in the district.
