= Soharin =

Village in Zanjan province, Iran

Soharin Persian: سهرين
- Village
- Location within Iran
- Coordinates: 36°51′50″N 48°24′51″E
- Country: Iran
- Province: Zanjan
- County: Zanjan
- District: Qareh Poshtelu
- Rural District: Soharin

Population (2016)
  - Total: 2,424
- Time zone: UTC+3:30 (IRST)

Soharin (Persian: سهرين) (Note: Also romanized as Soharīn and Sohrīn; also known as Mehrīn, Zokhrun, Z̄ūkarā’īn, and Zukrāīn) is a village in, and the capital of, Soharin Rural District in Qareh Poshtelu District of Zanjan County, Zanjan province, Iran.

== Demographics ==
=== Population ===
At the time of the 2006 National Census, the village's population was 2,309 in 602 households, when it was in Qareh Poshtelu-e Bala Rural District. The following census in 2011 counted 2,390 people in 715 households. The 2016 census measured the population of the village as 2,424 people in 771 households, by which time it had been transferred to Soharin Rural District created in the district. It was the most populous village in its rural district.
