= Amuowghli =

Amuowghli or Amu Owghli (Persian: عمواوغلي), also rendered as Amu Oghli, may refer to:

- Amuowghli-ye Olya
- Amuowghli-ye Sofla
