= Shur Tappeh =

Shur Tappeh (Persian: شورتپه) may refer to:

- Shur Tappeh, Afghanistan
- Shur Tappeh, Iran
