= Qebleh Bolaghi =

Qebleh Bolaghi (Persian: قبله بلاغي) may refer to:

- Qebleh Bolaghi, Kurdistan
- Qebleh Bolaghi, Zanjan
