= Khvajehlar-e Olya =

Khvajehlar-e Olya خواجه لرعليا
- Village
- Location within Iran
- Coordinates: 36°57′48″N 47°12′55″E
- Country: Iran
- Province: East Azerbaijan
- County: Charuymaq
- Bakhsh: Shadian
- Rural District: Charuymaq-e Jonubesharqi

Population (2006)
  - Total: 95
- Time zone: UTC+3:30 (IRST)
  - Summer (DST): UTC+4:30 (IRDT)

Khvajehlar-e Olya (Persian: خواجه لرعليا, also Romanized as Khvājehlar-e ‘Olyā) is a village in Charuymaq-e Jonubesharqi Rural District, Shadian District, Charuymaq County, East Azerbaijan Province, Iran. At the 2006 census, its population was 95, in 17 families.
