= Duz Aychi =

Duz Aychi دوزايچي
- Village
- Location within Iran
- Coordinates: 37°00′24″N 47°09′24″E
- Country: Iran
- Province: East Azerbaijan
- County: Charuymaq
- Bakhsh: Shadian
- Rural District: Charuymaq-e Jonubesharqi

Population (2006)
  - Total: 39
- Time zone: UTC+3:30 (IRST)
  - Summer (DST): UTC+4:30 (IRDT)

Duz Aychi (Persian: دوزايچي, also Romanized as Dūz Āychī and Dūzāychī) is a village in Charuymaq-e Jonubesharqi Rural District, Shadian District, Charuymaq County, East Azerbaijan Province, Iran.

The closest major cities include Bukan, Zanjan, Tabriz and Ardabil. At the 2006 census, its population was 39, in 7 families.
