= Toryan Qeshlaqi =

Toryan Qeshlaqi تريان قشلاقي
- Village
- Location within Iran
- Coordinates: 37°10′35″N 47°30′30″E
- Country: Iran
- Province: East Azerbaijan
- County: Charuymaq
- Bakhsh: Shadian
- Rural District: Charuymaq-e Sharqi

Population (2006)
  - Total: 469
- Time zone: UTC+3:30 (IRST)
  - Summer (DST): UTC+4:30 (IRDT)

Toryan Qeshlaqi (Persian: تريان قشلاقي, also Romanized as Toryān Qeshlāqī; also known as Toryān) is a village in Charuymaq-e Sharqi Rural District, Shadian District, Charuymaq County, East Azerbaijan Province, Iran. At the 2006 census, its population was 469, in 76 families.
