= Valiyaran =

Village in Zanjan province, Iran

Valiyaran Persian: ولياران
- Village
- Location within Iran
- Coordinates: 36°57′22″N 48°24′08″E
- Country: Iran
- Province: Zanjan
- County: Zanjan
- District: Qareh Poshtelu
- Rural District: Soharin

Population (2016)
  - Total: 591
- Time zone: UTC+3:30 (IRST)

Valiyaran (Persian: ولياران) (Note: Also romanized as Valīyārān and Valyārān; also known as Valgaran and Walgaran) is a village in Soharin Rural District of Qareh Poshtelu District in Zanjan County, Zanjan province, Iran.

== Demographics ==
=== Population ===
At the time of the 2006 National Census, the village's population was 605 in 132 households, when it was in Qareh Poshtelu-e Bala Rural District. The following census in 2011 counted 646 people in 176 households. The 2016 census measured the population of the village as 591 people in 174 households, by which time it had been transferred to Soharin Rural District created in the district.
