= Owrta Bolagh =

Village in Zanjan province, Iran

Owrta Bolagh Persian: اورتا بلاغ
- Village
- Location within Iran
- Coordinates: 36°57′38″N 48°22′51″E
- Country: Iran
- Province: Zanjan
- County: Zanjan
- District: Qareh Poshtelu
- Rural District: Soharin

Population (2016)
  - Total: 273
- Time zone: UTC+3:30 (IRST)

Owrta Bolagh (Persian: اورتا بلاغ) (Note: Also romanized as ' Owrtā Bolāgh and Ūrtā Bolāgh; also known as Arooteh Bolagh, Owrtah Bolāgh, Owrteh Bolāgh, Urtahbulāq, and Urtakh-Bulag) is a village in Soharin Rural District of Qareh Poshtelu District in Zanjan County, Zanjan province, Iran.

== Demographics ==
=== Population ===
At the time of the 2006 National Census, the village's population was 246 in 61 households, when it was in Qareh Poshtelu-e Bala Rural District. The following census in 2011 counted 273 people in 75 households. The 2016 census measured the population of the village as 273 people in 80 households, by which time it had been transferred to Soharin Rural District created in the district.
