= Tekmeh Dash (disambiguation) =

Tekmeh Dash is a city in East Azerbaijan Province, Iran.

Tekmeh Dash or Tokmeh Dash (Persian: تكمه داش) may also refer to:

- Tekmeh Dash, East Azerbaijan
- Tokmeh Dash, Hamadan
- Tekmeh Dash, Zanjan
- Tekmeh Dash District, in East Azerbaijan Province

== See also ==
- Tikmeh Dash (disambiguation)
