= Aqcheh =

Aqcheh (Persian: اقچه) may refer to:

- Aqcheh, Isfahan
- Aqcheh, Kurdistan

== See also ==
- Aghcheh (disambiguation)
- Aqcheh is a common element in Iranian place names; see
