= Khan Khanom =

Khan Khanom خان خانم
- Village
- Location within Iran
- Coordinates: 37°12′16″N 47°08′16″E
- Country: Iran
- Province: East Azerbaijan
- County: Charuymaq
- Bakhsh: Shadian
- Rural District: Charuymaq-e Sharqi

Population (2006)
  - Total: 79
- Time zone: UTC+3:30 (IRST)
  - Summer (DST): UTC+4:30 (IRDT)

Khan Khanom (Persian: خان خانم, also Romanized as Khān Khānom) is a village in Charuymaq-e Sharqi Rural District, Shadian District, Charuymaq County, East Azerbaijan Province, Iran. At the 2006 census, the village had a population of 79 residents in 13 families.
