= Qarah Gonbad =

Qarah Gonbad or Qareh Gonbad (Persian: قره گنبد) may refer to:

- Qarah Gonbad-e Olya
- Qarah Gonbad-e Sofla
