= Saremsaqlu, Zanjan =

Village in Zanjan province, Iran

Saremsaqlu Persian: سارمساقلو
- Village
- Location within Iran
- Coordinates: 36°45′31″N 48°22′12″E
- Country: Iran
- Province: Zanjan
- County: Zanjan
- District: Qareh Poshtelu
- Rural District: Soharin

Population (2016)
  - Total: 528
- Time zone: UTC+3:30 (IRST)

Saremsaqlu (Persian: سارمساقلو) (Note: Also romanized as Sāremsāqlū; also known as Sāremsākhlū (سارمساخلو), Sāram Sākhli, and Sarym-Sogly) is a village in Soharin Rural District of Qareh Poshtelu District in Zanjan County, Zanjan province, Iran.

== Demographics ==
=== Population ===
At the time of the 2006 National Census, the village's population was 542 in 145 households, when it was in Qareh Poshtelu-e Bala Rural District. The following census in 2011 counted 565 people in 159 households. The 2016 census measured the population of the village as 528 people in 164 households, by which time it had been transferred to Soharin Rural District created in the district.
