= Manishgah =

Manishgah منيشگه
- Village
- Location within Iran
- Coordinates: 36°59′51″N 47°04′11″E
- Country: Iran
- Province: East Azerbaijan
- County: Charuymaq
- Bakhsh: Shadian
- Rural District: Charuymaq-e Jonubesharqi

Population (2006)
  - Total: 89
- Time zone: UTC+3:30 (IRST)
  - Summer (DST): UTC+4:30 (IRDT)

Manishgah (Persian: منيشگه, also Romanized as Manīshgah; also known as Manesh Kandī and Maneshkeh) is a village in Charuymaq-e Jonubesharqi Rural District, Shadian District, Charuymaq County, East Azerbaijan Province, Iran. At the 2006 census, its population was 89, in 21 families.
