= Mahmudabad, Zanjan =

Village in Zanjan province, Iran

Mahmudabad Persian: محموداباد
- Village
- Location within Iran
- Coordinates: 36°54′51″N 48°21′15″E
- Country: Iran
- Province: Zanjan
- County: Zanjan
- District: Qareh Poshtelu
- Rural District: Soharin

Population (2016)
  - Total: 225
- Time zone: UTC+3:30 (IRST)

Mahmudabad (Persian: محموداباد) (Note: Also romanized as Maḩmūdābād; also known as Maḩmūābād, Maḩmūdābād-e Tāzeh Kand, and Makhmudabad) is a village in Soharin Rural District of Qareh Poshtelu District in Zanjan County, Zanjan province, Iran.

== Demographics ==
=== Population ===
At the time of the 2006 National Census, the village's population was 265 in 53 households, when it was in Qareh Poshtelu-e Bala Rural District. The following census in 2011 counted 259 people in 67 households. The 2016 census measured the population of the village as 225 people in 60 households, by which time it had been transferred to Soharin Rural District created in the district.
