= Qeshlaq, Zanjan =

Village in Zanjan province, Iran

Qeshlaq Persian: قشلاق
- Village
- Location within Iran
- Coordinates: 36°55′09″N 48°19′19″E
- Country: Iran
- Province: Zanjan
- County: Zanjan
- District: Qareh Poshtelu
- Rural District: Soharin

Population (2016)
  - Total: 532
- Time zone: UTC+3:30 (IRST)

Qeshlaq (Persian: قشلاق) (Note: Also romanized as Qeshlāq; also known as Kishlak and Qishlāq) is a village in Soharin Rural District of Qareh Poshtelu District in Zanjan County, Zanjan province, Iran.

== Demographics ==
=== Population ===
At the time of the 2006 National Census, the village's population was 576 in 135 households, when it was in Qareh Poshtelu-e Bala Rural District. The following census in 2011 counted 517 people in 164 households. The 2016 census measured the population of the village as 532 people in 170 households, by which time it had been transferred to Soharin Rural District created in the district.
