= Aghcheh Mashhad =

Aghcheh Mashhad (Persian: اغچه مشهد) may refer to:

- Aghcheh Mashhad, Charuymaq
- Aghcheh Mashhad, Malekan
- Aghcheh Mashhad, Maragheh
