= Tikmeh Dash =

Tikmeh Dash (Persian: تيكمه داش) may refer to several places in Iran:

- Tikmeh Dash, Bostanabad, East Azerbaijan Province
- Tikmeh Dash, Hashtrud, East Azerbaijan Province
- Tikmeh Dash, Zanjan
- Tikmeh Dash District, in East Azerbaijan Province

== See also ==
- Tekmeh Dash (disambiguation)
