= Cher Chera =

Cher Chera چرچرا
- Village
- Location within Iran
- Coordinates: 36°59′11″N 47°18′24″E
- Country: Iran
- Province: East Azerbaijan
- County: Charuymaq
- Bakhsh: Shadian
- Rural District: Charuymaq-e Sharqi

Population (2006)
  - Total: 122
- Time zone: UTC+3:30 (IRST)
  - Summer (DST): UTC+4:30 (IRDT)

Cher Chera (Persian: چرچرا, also Romanized as Cher Cherā) is a village in Charuymaq-e Sharqi Rural District, Shadian District, Charuymaq County, East Azerbaijan Province, Iran. At the 2006 census, its population was 122, in 17 families.
