= Mulavi Kuranlu =

Mulavi Kuranlu مولوي كورانلو
- Village
- Location within Iran
- Coordinates: 37°02′53″N 47°22′25″E
- Country: Iran
- Province: East Azerbaijan
- County: Charuymaq
- Bakhsh: Shadian
- Rural District: Charuymaq-e Sharqi

Population (2006)
  - Total: 96
- Time zone: UTC+3:30 (IRST)
  - Summer (DST): UTC+4:30 (IRDT)

Mulavi Kuranlu (Persian: مولوي كورانلو, also Romanized as Mūlavī Kūrānlū; also known as Mūlī Kūrānī) is a village in Charuymaq-e Sharqi Rural District, Shadian District, Charuymaq County, East Azerbaijan Province, Iran. At the 2006 census, its population was 96, in 15 families.
