= Varmazyar, Iran =

Varmazyar (Persian: ورمزيار) in Iran may refer to:

- Varmazyar, Kermanshah
- Varmazyar, Showt, West Azerbaijan Province
- Varmazyar, Urmia, West Azerbaijan Province
- Varmazyar-e Olya, Zanjan Province
- Varmazyar-e Sofla, Zanjan Province
