= Qarah Tappeh, Qareh Poshtelu =

Village in Zanjan province, Iran

Qarah Tappeh Persian: قره‌تپه
- Village
- Location within Iran
- Coordinates: 36°57′31″N 48°18′18″E
- Country: Iran
- Province: Zanjan
- County: Zanjan
- District: Qareh Poshtelu
- Rural District: Qareh Poshtelu-e Bala

Population (2016)
  - Total: 630
- Time zone: UTC+3:30 (IRST)

Qarah Tappeh (Persian: قره‌تپه) (Note: Also romanized as Qareh Tappeh; also known as Kara-Tapa, Qār Tappeh, and Qaratepe) is a village in Qareh Poshtelu-e Bala Rural District of Qareh Poshtelu District in Zanjan County, Zanjan province, Iran.

Qarah Tappeh is 10 km from the city of Armaghankhaneh. The main activity of the village is agriculture, and there is also a barrier near the village that feeds the surrounding gardens.

== Demographics ==
=== Population ===
At the time of the 2006 National Census, the village's population was 648 in 136 households. The following census in 2011 counted 650 people in 184 households. The 2016 census measured the population of the village as 630 people in 186 households.
