= Pir Qoli =

Pir Qoli پيرقلي
- Village
- Location within Iran
- Coordinates: 37°02′59″N 47°12′45″E
- Country: Iran
- Province: East Azerbaijan
- County: Charuymaq
- Bakhsh: Shadian
- Rural District: Charuymaq-e Sharqi

Population (2006)
  - Total: 99
- Time zone: UTC+3:30 (IRST)
  - Summer (DST): UTC+4:30 (IRDT)

Pir Qoli (Persian: پيرقلي, also Romanized as Pīr Qolī) is a village in Charuymaq-e Sharqi Rural District, Shadian District, Charuymaq County, East Azerbaijan Province, Iran. At the time of 2006 census, its population was 99, in 17 families.
