= Chuktu =

Chuktu چوكتو
- Village
- Location within Iran
- Coordinates: 36°52′48″N 47°05′10″E
- Country: Iran
- Province: East Azerbaijan
- County: Charuymaq
- Bakhsh: Shadian
- Rural District: Charuymaq-e Jonubesharqi

Population (2006)
  - Total: 61
- Time zone: UTC+3:30 (IRST)
  - Summer (DST): UTC+4:30 (IRDT)

Chuktu (Persian: چوكتو, also Romanized as Chūktū and Chūkatū; also known as Chaktū and Chūqtū) is a village in Charuymaq-e Jonubesharqi Rural District, Shadian District, Charuymaq County, East Azerbaijan Province, Iran. At the 2006 census, its population was 61, in 13 families.

== Name ==
According to Vladimir Minorsky, the name Chukatū is derived from the Mongolian language and means "with small stones".
