= Khazar Guran-e Olya =

Khazar Guran-e Olya خضرگوران عليا
- Village
- Location within Iran
- Coordinates: 36°51′08″N 47°04′29″E
- Country: Iran
- Province: East Azerbaijan
- County: Charuymaq
- Bakhsh: Shadian
- Rural District: Charuymaq-e Jonubesharqi

Population (2006)
  - Total: 47
- Time zone: UTC+3:30 (IRST)
  - Summer (DST): UTC+4:30 (IRDT)

Khazar Guran-e Olya (Persian: خضرگوران عليا, also Romanized as Khaẕar Gūrān-e ‘Olyā and Khaz̄ar Gūrān-e ‘Olyā) is a village in Charuymaq-e Jonubesharqi Rural District, Shadian District, Charuymaq County, East Azerbaijan Province, Iran. At the 2006 census, its population was 47, in 7 families.
