= Kord Kandi, Zanjan =

Village in Zanjan province, Iran

Kord Kandi Persian: كردكندي
- Village
- Location within Iran
- Coordinates: 36°49′51″N 48°26′17″E
- Country: Iran
- Province: Zanjan
- County: Zanjan
- District: Qareh Poshtelu
- Rural District: Soharin

Population (2016)
  - Total: 246
- Time zone: UTC+3:30 (IRST)

Kord Kandi (Persian: كردكندي) (Note: Also romanized as Kord Kandī and Kurd-Kandi) is a village in Soharin Rural District of Qareh Poshtelu District in Zanjan County, Zanjan province, Iran.

== Demographics ==
=== Population ===
At the time of the 2006 National Census, the village's population was 322 in 76 households, when it was in Qareh Poshtelu-e Bala Rural District. The following census in 2011 counted 285 people in 80 households. The 2016 census measured the population of the village as 246 people in 71 households, by which time it had been transferred to Soharin Rural District created in the district.
