= Paltalu =

Paltalu or Paletlu (Persian: پالتلو) may refer to:

- Paletlu, East Azerbaijan
- Paltalu, Zanjan
