= Legahi =

Village in Zanjan province, Iran

Legahi Persian: لگاهي
- Village
- Location within Iran
- Coordinates: 36°53′33″N 48°24′23″E
- Country: Iran
- Province: Zanjan
- County: Zanjan
- District: Qareh Poshtelu
- Rural District: Soharin

Population (2016)
  - Total: 451
- Time zone: UTC+3:30 (IRST)

Legahi (Persian: لگاهي) (Note: Also romanized as Lagāhī and Legāhī; also known as Lyakyagi and Nakāhī) is a village in Soharin Rural District of Qareh Poshtelu District in Zanjan County, Zanjan province, Iran.

== Demographics ==
=== Population ===
At the time of the 2006 National Census, the village's population was 384 in 80 households, when it was in Qareh Poshtelu-e Bala Rural District. The following census in 2011 counted 429 people in 119 households. The 2016 census measured the population of the village as 451 people in 132 households, by which time it had been transferred to Soharin Rural District created in the district.
