= Birundeh =

Village in Zanjan province, Iran

Birundeh Persian: بيرونده
- Village
- Location within Iran
- Coordinates: 37°09′51″N 48°08′42″E
- Country: Iran
- Province: Zanjan
- County: Zanjan
- District: Qareh Poshtelu
- Rural District: Qareh Poshtelu-e Pain

Population (2016)
  - Total: 185
- Time zone: UTC+3:30 (IRST)

Birundeh (Persian: بيرونده) (Note: Also romanized as Bīrūndeh; also known as Berūndeh, Birundekh, Birundoh, and Borūndeh) is a village in Qareh Poshtelu-e Pain Rural District of Qareh Poshtelu District in Zanjan County, Zanjan province, Iran.

== Demographics ==
=== Population ===
At the time of the 2006 National Census, the village's population was 365 in 80 households. The following census in 2011 counted 216 people in 58 households. The 2016 census measured the population of the village as 185 people in 60 households.
