= Qermezi Bagh =

Village in East Azerbaijan province, Iran

Qermezi Bagh Persian: قرمزي باغ
- Village
- Location within Iran
- Coordinates: 36°50′47″N 47°12′05″E
- Country: Iran
- Province: East Azerbaijan
- County: Charuymaq
- District: Shadian
- Rural District: Charuymaq-e Jonubesharqi

Population (2016)
  - Total: 208
- Time zone: UTC+3:30 (IRST)

Qermezi Bagh (Persian: قرمزي باغ) (Note: Also romanized as Qermezī Bāgh) is a village in Charuymaq-e Jonubesharqi Rural District of Shadian District in Charuymaq County, East Azerbaijan province, Iran.

== Demographics ==
=== Population ===
At the time of the 2006 National Census, the village's population was 209 in 36 households. The following census in 2011 counted 174 people in 35 households. The 2016 census measured the population of the village as 208 people in 51 households.
