= Golchin, Zanjan =

Village in Zanjan province, Iran

Golchin Persian: گلچين
- Village
- Location within Iran
- Coordinates: 37°05′31″N 48°26′14″E
- Country: Iran
- Province: Zanjan
- County: Zanjan
- District: Qareh Poshtelu
- Rural District: Qareh Poshtelu-e Bala

Population (2016)
  - Total: 31
- Time zone: UTC+3:30 (IRST)

Golchin (Persian: گلچين) (Note: Also romanized as Golchīn; also known as Galjīn, Gil’dzhin, Giljin (گیلجين), Goljīn, and Jeljīn) is a village in Qareh Poshtelu-e Bala Rural District of Qareh Poshtelu District in Zanjan County, Zanjan province, Iran.

== Demographics ==
=== Population ===
At the time of the 2006 National Census, the village's population was 185 in 44 households. The following census in 2011 counted 119 people in 34 households. The 2016 census measured the population of the village as 31 people in 11 households.
