= Jazimaq =

Village in Zanjan province, Iran

Jazimaq Persian: جزيمق
- Village
- Location within Iran
- Coordinates: 37°11′39″N 48°20′09″E
- Country: Iran
- Province: Zanjan
- County: Zanjan
- District: Qareh Poshtelu
- Rural District: Qareh Poshtelu-e Pain

Population (2016)
  - Total: 168
- Time zone: UTC+3:30 (IRST)

Jazimaq (Persian: جزيمق) (Note: Also romanized as Jazīmaq; also known as Jazīman (جزيمن), Gizmeh, Kharīmaq, and Kiz’ma) is a village in Qareh Poshtelu-e Pain Rural District of Qareh Poshtelu District in Zanjan County, Zanjan province, Iran.

== Demographics ==
=== Population ===
At the time of the 2006 National Census, the village's population was 250 in 51 households. The following census in 2011 counted 224 people in 54 households. The 2016 census measured the population of the village as 168 people in 49 households.
