= Qarah Hesarlu =

Village in Zanjan province, Iran

Qarah Hesarlu Persian: قره‌حصارلو
- Village
- Location within Iran
- Coordinates: 37°10′50″N 48°17′21″E
- Country: Iran
- Province: Zanjan
- County: Zanjan
- District: Qareh Poshtelu
- Rural District: Qareh Poshtelu-e Pain

Population (2016)
  - Total: 90
- Time zone: UTC+3:30 (IRST)

Qarah Hesarlu (Persian: قره‌حصارلو) (Note: Also romanized as Qarah Ḩeşārlū and Qareh Ḩeşārlū; also known as Ḩeşārlū) is a village in Qareh Poshtelu-e Pain Rural District of Qareh Poshtelu District in Zanjan County, Zanjan province, Iran.

== Demographics ==
=== Population ===
At the time of the 2006 National Census, the village's population was 93 in 21 households. The following census in 2011 counted 90 people in 19 households. The 2016 census measured the population of the village as 90 people in 29 households.
