= Aga Jari =

Aga Jari (Persian: اگاجري) may refer to:

- Aga Jari, East Azerbaijan
- Aga Jari, Zanjan
