= Qamat =

Qamat قامت
- Village
- Location within Iran
- Coordinates: 37°32′50″N 45°11′57″E
- Country: Iran
- Province: West Azerbaijan
- County: Urmia
- Bakhsh: Central
- Rural District: Bakeshluchay

Population (2006)
  - Total: 63
- Time zone: UTC+3:30 (IRST)
  - Summer (DST): UTC+4:30 (IRDT)

Qamat (Persian: قامت, also Romanized as Qāmat) is a village in Bakeshluchay Rural District, in the Central District of Urmia County, West Azerbaijan Province, Iran. At the 2006 census, its population was 63, in 20 families.
