= Zaker Kandi =

Village in East Azerbaijan province, Iran

Zaker Kandi Persian: ذاكركندي
- Village
- Location within Iran
- Coordinates: 36°59′09″N 47°07′53″E
- Country: Iran
- Province: East Azerbaijan
- County: Charuymaq
- District: Shadian
- Rural District: Charuymaq-e Jonubesharqi

Population (2016)
  - Total: 456
- Time zone: UTC+3:30 (IRST)

Zaker Kandi (Persian: ذاكركندي) (Note: Also romanized as Z̄āker Kandī) is a village in, and the capital of, Charuymaq-e Jonubesharqi Rural District in Shadian District of Charuymaq County, East Azerbaijan province, Iran.

== Demographics ==
=== Population ===
At the time of the 2006 National Census, the village's population was 544 in 105 households. The following census in 2011 counted 521 people in 132 households. The 2016 census measured the population of the village as 456 people in 140 households.
