= Aghcheh Rish =

Aghcheh Rish (Persian: اغچه ريش) may refer to:

- Aghcheh Rish, Charuymaq
- Aghcheh Rish, Hashtrud
