= Salarabad, Zanjan =

Village in Zanjan province, Iran

Salarabad Persian: سالاراباد
- Village
- Location within Iran
- Coordinates: 37°10′52″N 48°14′45″E
- Country: Iran
- Province: Zanjan
- County: Zanjan
- District: Qareh Poshtelu
- Rural District: Qareh Poshtelu-e Pain

Population (2016)
  - Total: 15
- Time zone: UTC+3:30 (IRST)

Salarabad (Persian: سالاراباد) (Note: Also romanized as Sālārābād; also known as Qārājālār) is a village in Qareh Poshtelu-e Pain Rural District of Qareh Poshtelu District in Zanjan County, Zanjan province, Iran.

== Demographics ==
=== Population ===
At the time of the 2006 National Census, the village's population was 23 in four households. The following census in 2011 counted 18 people in five households. The 2016 census measured the population of the village as 15 people in six households.
