= Kalhin =

Village in Zanjan province, Iran

Kalhin Persian: كلهين
- Village
- Location within Iran
- Coordinates: 37°07′24″N 48°21′04″E
- Country: Iran
- Province: Zanjan
- County: Zanjan
- District: Qareh Poshtelu
- Rural District: Qareh Poshtelu-e Pain

Population (2016)
  - Total: 63
- Time zone: UTC+3:30 (IRST)

Kalhin (Persian: كلهين) (Note: Also romanized as Kalhīn) is a village in Qareh Poshtelu-e Pain Rural District of Qareh Poshtelu District in Zanjan County, Zanjan province, Iran.

== Demographics ==
=== Population ===
At the time of the 2006 National Census, the village's population was 115 in 26 households. The following census in 2011 counted 92 people in 24 households. The 2016 census measured the population of the village as 63 people in 18 households.
