= Zangi Kuh =

Village in Zanjan province, Iran

Zangi Kuh Persian: زنگ‌ی کوه
- Village
- Location within Iran
- Coordinates: 37°05′25″N 48°18′04″E
- Country: Iran
- Province: Zanjan
- County: Zanjan
- District: Qareh Poshtelu
- Rural District: Qareh Poshtelu-e Bala

Population (2016)
  - Total: 134
- Time zone: UTC+3:30 (IRST)

Zangi Kuh (Persian: زنگی کوه) (Note: Also romanized as Zangī Kūh; also known as Dāgh Zangī and Dag-Zangi) is a village in Qareh Poshtelu-e Bala Rural District of Qareh Poshtelu District in Zanjan County, Zanjan province, Iran.

== Demographics ==
=== Population ===
At the time of the 2006 National Census, the village's population was 160 in 40 households. The following census in 2011 counted 131 people in 34 households. The 2016 census measured the population of the village as 134 people in 39 households.
