= Dash Bolagh, Zanjan =

Village in Zanjan province, Iran

Dash Bolagh Persian: داش بلاغ
- Village
- Location within Iran
- Coordinates: 37°06′17″N 48°14′14″E
- Country: Iran
- Province: Zanjan
- County: Zanjan
- District: Qareh Poshtelu
- Rural District: Qareh Poshtelu-e Pain

Population (2016)
  - Total: 52
- Time zone: UTC+3:30 (IRST)

Dash Bolagh (Persian: داش بلاغ) (Note: Also romanized as Dāsh Bolāgh and Dāshbolāgh; also known as Dash Bulag, Dāshbūlāgh, and Dāshbulāq) is a village in Qareh Poshtelu-e Pain Rural District of Qareh Poshtelu District in Zanjan County, Zanjan province, Iran.

== Demographics ==
=== Population ===
At the time of the 2006 National Census, the village's population was 103 in 24 households. The following census in 2011 counted 72 people in 22 households. The 2016 census measured the population of the village as 52 people in 19 households.
