= Owrachi =

Village in Zanjan province, Iran

Owrachi Persian: اوراچي
- Village
- Location within Iran
- Coordinates: 36°59′25″N 48°16′32″E
- Country: Iran
- Province: Zanjan
- County: Zanjan
- District: Qareh Poshtelu
- Rural District: Qareh Poshtelu-e Bala

Population (2016)
  - Total: 19
- Time zone: UTC+3:30 (IRST)

Owrachi (Persian: اوراچي) (Note: Also romanized as Owrāchī and Ūrāchī; also known as Orāchī and Orchi) is a village in Qareh Poshtelu-e Bala Rural District of Qareh Poshtelu District in Zanjan County, Zanjan province, Iran.

== Demographics ==
=== Population ===
At the time of the 2006 National Census, the village's population was 40 in 12 households. The following census in 2011 counted 29 people in nine households. The 2016 census measured the population of the village as 19 people in six households.
