= Varmazyar =

Varmazyar or Varmaziar may refer to:

- Arevashat, Armenia
- Varmazyar, Iran (disambiguation)
