= Qelech Khan Kandi =

Village in East Azerbaijan province, Iran

Qelech Khan Kandi Persian: قلچ خان كندي
- Village
- Location within Iran
- Coordinates: 36°54′11″N 47°14′37″E
- Country: Iran
- Province: East Azerbaijan
- County: Charuymaq
- District: Shadian
- Rural District: Charuymaq-e Jonubesharqi

Population (2016)
  - Total: 474
- Time zone: UTC+3:30 (IRST)

Qelech Khan Kandi (Persian: قلچ خان كندي) (Note: Also romanized as Qelech Khān Kandī; also known as Qelīch Khān Kandī and Qelīchkhān Kandī) is a village in Charuymaq-e Jonubesharqi Rural District of Shadian District in Charuymaq County, East Azerbaijan province, Iran.

== Demographics ==
=== Population ===
At the time of the 2006 National Census, the village's population was 483 in 82 households. The following census in 2011 counted 528 people in 117 households. The 2016 census measured the population of the village as 474 people in 127 households.
