= Hajj Siran =

Village in Zanjan province, Iran

Hajj Siran Persian: حاج سيران
- Village
- Location within Iran
- Coordinates: 37°10′59″N 48°13′26″E
- Country: Iran
- Province: Zanjan
- County: Zanjan
- District: Qareh Poshtelu
- Rural District: Qareh Poshtelu-e Pain

Population (2016)
  - Total: 321
- Time zone: UTC+3:30 (IRST)

Hajj Siran (Persian: حاج سيران) (Note: Also romanized as Ḩājj Sīrān and Ḩājjsīrān; also known as Gol Sīrān, Hajeiseran, Ḩājjī Sīrān, and Khadzheseyran) is a village in Qareh Poshtelu-e Pain Rural District of Qareh Poshtelu District in Zanjan County, Zanjan province, Iran.

== Demographics ==
=== Population ===
At the time of the 2006 National Census, the village's population was 383 in 83 households. The following census in 2011 counted 318 people in 87 households. The 2016 census measured the population of the village as 321 people in 106 households. It was the most populous village in its rural district.
