= Golojeh, Zanjan =

Village in Zanjan province, Iran

Golojeh Persian: گلجه
- Village
- Location within Iran
- Coordinates: 37°00′38″N 48°18′23″E
- Country: Iran
- Province: Zanjan
- County: Zanjan
- District: Qareh Poshtelu
- Rural District: Qareh Poshtelu-e Bala

Population (2016)
  - Total: 166
- Time zone: UTC+3:30 (IRST)

Golojeh (Persian: گلجه) (Note: Also romanized as Goljeh; also known as Golūjeh, Gūljeh, Guludzhakh, Gulujāh, and Koljeh) is a village in Qareh Poshtelu-e Bala Rural District of Qareh Poshtelu District in Zanjan County, Zanjan province, Iran.

== Demographics ==
=== Population ===
At the time of the 2006 National Census, the village's population was 374 in 84 households. The following census in 2011 counted 237 people in 60 households. The 2016 census measured the population of the village as 166 people in 53 households.
