= Zarrin Deh =

Zarrin Deh (Persian: زرين ده) may refer to:

- Zarrin Deh, East Azerbaijan
- Zarrin Deh, Tehran
