= Babuneh-ye Vosta =

Babuneh-ye Vosta بابونه وسطي
- Village
- Location within Iran
- Coordinates: 36°58′34″N 47°02′55″E
- Country: Iran
- Province: East Azerbaijan
- County: Charuymaq
- Bakhsh: Shadian
- Rural District: Charuymaq-e Jonubesharqi

Population (2006)
  - Total: 78
- Time zone: UTC+3:30 (IRST)
  - Summer (DST): UTC+4:30 (IRDT)

Babuneh-ye Vosta (Persian: بابونه وسطي, also Romanized as Bābūneh-ye Vosţá) is a village in Charuymaq-e Jonubesharqi Rural District, Shadian District, Charuymaq County, East Azerbaijan Province, Iran. A census in 2006 counted 78 people and 13 families.
