= Beyglar Kandi =

Village in East Azerbaijan province, Iran

Beyglar Kandi Persian: بيگلركندي
- Village
- Location within Iran
- Coordinates: 36°53′30″N 47°12′40″E
- Country: Iran
- Province: East Azerbaijan
- County: Charuymaq
- District: Shadian
- Rural District: Charuymaq-e Jonubesharqi

Population (2016)
  - Total: 247
- Time zone: UTC+3:30 (IRST)

Beyglar Kandi (Persian: بيگلركندي) (Note: Also romanized as Beyglar Kandī; also known as Beglar Kandī) is a village in Charuymaq-e Jonubesharqi Rural District of Shadian District in Charuymaq County, East Azerbaijan province, Iran.

== Demographics ==
=== Population ===
At the time of the 2006 National Census, the village's population was 259 in 43 households. The following census in 2011 counted 259 people in 60 households. The 2016 census measured the population of the village as 247 people in 67 households.
