= Qarluq, Zanjan =

Village in Zanjan province, Iran

Qarluq Persian: قارلوق
- Village
- Location within Iran
- Coordinates: 37°03′37″N 48°16′16″E
- Country: Iran
- Province: Zanjan
- County: Zanjan
- District: Qareh Poshtelu
- Rural District: Qareh Poshtelu-e Bala

Population (2016)
  - Total: 93
- Time zone: UTC+3:30 (IRST)

Qarluq (Persian: قارلوق) (Note: Also romanized as Qārlūq and Qarlūq; also known as Karluk, Qārloq, and Qārlūk) is a village in Qareh Poshtelu-e Bala Rural District of Qareh Poshtelu District in Zanjan County, Zanjan province, Iran.

== Demographics ==
=== Population ===
At the time of the 2006 National Census, the village's population was 152 in 27 households. The following census in 2011 counted 115 people in 28 households. The 2016 census measured the population of the village as 93 people in 29 households.
