= Qarah Gonbad-e Olya =

Qarah Gonbad-e Olya قره گنبدعليا
- Village
- Location within Iran
- Coordinates: 36°59′35″N 47°16′03″E
- Country: Iran
- Province: East Azerbaijan
- County: Charuymaq
- Bakhsh: Shadian
- Rural District: Charuymaq-e Sharqi

Population (2006)
  - Total: 120
- Time zone: UTC+3:30 (IRST)
  - Summer (DST): UTC+4:30 (IRDT)

Qarah Gonbad-e Olya (Persian: قره گنبدعليا, also romanized as Qarah Gonbad-e ‘Olyā and Qareh Gonbad-e ‘Olyā) is a village in Charuymaq-e Sharqi Rural District, Shadian District, Charuymaq County, East Azerbaijan Province, Iran. At the 2006 census, its population was 120, in 16 families.
