= Qareh Guni =

Qareh Guni or Qara Gunei or Qareh Gowney (Persian: قره گوني) may refer to:

- Qareh Guni, Heris
- Qareh Guni, Khoda Afarin

== See also ==
- Qarah Gonay (disambiguation)
