= Qarah Gonay-e Vosta =

Qarah Gonay-e Vosta قره گناي وسطي
- Village
- Location within Iran
- Coordinates: 37°07′11″N 47°27′25″E
- Country: Iran
- Province: East Azerbaijan
- County: Charuymaq
- Bakhsh: Shadian
- Rural District: Charuymaq-e Sharqi

Population (2006)
  - Total: 221
- Time zone: UTC+3:30 (IRST)
  - Summer (DST): UTC+4:30 (IRDT)

Qarah Gonay-e Vosta (Persian: قره گناي وسطي, also Romanized as Qarah Gonay-e Vosţá and Qareh Gonay-e Vosţá; also known as Qareh Gonāy and Qareh Gūney-ye Vosţá) is a village in Charuymaq-e Sharqi Rural District, Shadian District, Charuymaq County, East Azerbaijan Province, Iran. At the 2006 census, its population was 221, in 40 families.
