= Babuneh-ye Olya =

Babune-ye Olya بابونه عليا
- Village
- Location within Iran
- Coordinates: 36°58′03″N 47°02′48″E
- Country: Iran
- Province: East Azerbaijan
- County: Charuymaq
- Bakhsh: Shadian
- Rural District: Charuymaq-e Jonubesharqi

Population (2006)
  - Total: 44
- Time zone: UTC+3:30 (IRST)
  - Summer (DST): UTC+4:30 (IRDT)

Babuneh-ye Olya (Persian: بابونه عليا, also Romanized as Bābūneh-ye 'Olyā) is a village in Charuymaq-e Jonubesharqi Rural District, Shadian District, Charuymaq County, East Azerbaijan province, Iran. At the 2006 census, its population was 44, in 8 families. it is located beside the Aydoghmush river. this village is well known for its apple gardens. to the south and north this village is limited respectively to Qochahmad and Ara-Babinə. residents of Babune speak Azeri-Turkish.
