= Bahram Beyk =

Village in Zanjan province, Iran

Bahram Beyk Persian: بهرامبيك
- Village
- Location within Iran
- Coordinates: 37°03′29″N 48°15′01″E
- Country: Iran
- Province: Zanjan
- County: Zanjan
- District: Qareh Poshtelu
- Rural District: Qareh Poshtelu-e Bala

Population (2016)
  - Total: 358
- Time zone: UTC+3:30 (IRST)

Bahram Beyk (Persian: بهرامبيك) (Note: Also romanized as Bahrām Beyk; also known as Bahrām Beyg, Bairambai, Bayrām Beyk, and Bayrambey) is a village in Qareh Poshtelu-e Bala Rural District of Qareh Poshtelu District in Zanjan County, Zanjan province, Iran.

== Demographics ==
=== Population ===
At the time of the 2006 National Census, the village's population was 469 in 102 households. The following census in 2011 counted 383 people in 105 households. The 2016 census measured the population of the village as 358 people in 118 households.
