= Qashqa Tappeh =

Village in Zanjan province, Iran

Qashqa Tappeh Persian: قاشقاتپه
- Village
- Location within Iran
- Coordinates: 36°59′29″N 48°15′36″E
- Country: Iran
- Province: Zanjan
- County: Zanjan
- District: Qareh Poshtelu
- Rural District: Qareh Poshtelu-e Bala

Population (2016)
  - Total: 71
- Time zone: UTC+3:30 (IRST)

Qashqa Tappeh (Persian: قاشقاتپه) (Note: Also romanized as Qāshqā Tappeh; also known as Qashqeh Tappeh) is a village in Qareh Poshtelu-e Bala Rural District of Qareh Poshtelu District in Zanjan County, Zanjan province, Iran.

== Demographics ==
=== Population ===
At the time of the 2006 National Census, the village's population was 65 in 16 households. The following census in 2011 counted 58 people in 15 households. The 2016 census measured the population of the village as 71 people in 22 households.
