= Lahargin =

Village in Zanjan province, Iran

Lahargin Persian: لهرگين
- Village
- Location within Iran
- Coordinates: 37°06′55″N 48°18′05″E
- Country: Iran
- Province: Zanjan
- County: Zanjan
- District: Qareh Poshtelu
- Rural District: Qareh Poshtelu-e Pain

Population (2016)
  - Total: 78
- Time zone: UTC+3:30 (IRST)

Lahargin (Persian: لهرگين) (Note: Also romanized as Lahargīn and Lahrgīn; also known as Laharjīn and Lakhargin) is a village in Qareh Poshtelu-e Pain Rural District of Qareh Poshtelu District in Zanjan County, Zanjan province, Iran.

== Demographics ==
=== Population ===
At the time of the 2006 National Census, the village's population was 62 in 13 households. The following census in 2011 counted 53 people in 15 households. The 2016 census measured the population of the village as 78 people in 23 households.
