= Posht-e Gol =

Posht-e Gol (Persian: پشتگل) may refer to:

- Posht-e Gol, Mazandaran
- Posht-e Gol, West Azerbaijan
