= Paltalu, Zanjan =

Village in Zanjan province, Iran

Paltalu Persian: پالتلو
- Village
- Location within Iran
- Coordinates: 36°47′28″N 48°27′04″E
- Country: Iran
- Province: Zanjan
- County: Zanjan
- District: Qareh Poshtelu
- Rural District: Soharin

Population (2016)
  - Total: 34
- Time zone: UTC+3:30 (IRST)

Paltalu (Persian: پالتلو) (Note: Also romanized as Pāltalū; also known as Bāletlū) is a village in Soharin Rural District of Qareh Poshtelu District in Zanjan County, Zanjan province, Iran.

== Demographics ==
=== Population ===
At the time of the 2006 National Census, the village's population was 90 in 26 households, when it was in Qareh Poshtelu-e Bala Rural District. The following census in 2011 counted 55 people in 19 households. The 2016 census measured the population of the village as 34 people in 16 households, by which time it had been transferred to Soharin Rural District created in the district.
