= Do Saran =

Village in Zanjan province, Iran

Do Saran Persian: دوسران
- Village
- Location within Iran
- Coordinates: 36°58′52″N 48°19′20″E
- Country: Iran
- Province: Zanjan
- County: Zanjan
- District: Qareh Poshtelu
- Rural District: Qareh Poshtelu-e Bala

Population (2016)
  - Total: 114
- Time zone: UTC+3:30 (IRST)

Do Saran (Persian: دوسران) (Note: Also romanized as Do Sarān, Dowsarān, and Dusaran) is a village in Qareh Poshtelu-e Bala Rural District of Qareh Poshtelu District in Zanjan County, Zanjan province, Iran.

== Demographics ==
=== Population ===
At the time of the 2006 National Census, the village's population was 146 in 35 households. The following census in 2011 counted 132 people in 41 households. The 2016 census measured the population of the village as 114 people in 34 households.
