= Owch Bolagh, Zanjan =

Village in Zanjan province, Iran

Owch Bolagh Persian: اوچ بلاغ
- Village
- Location within Iran
- Coordinates: 37°00′41″N 48°14′41″E
- Country: Iran
- Province: Zanjan
- County: Zanjan
- District: Qareh Poshtelu
- Rural District: Qareh Poshtelu-e Bala

Population (2016)
  - Total: 179
- Time zone: UTC+3:30 (IRST)

Owch Bolagh (Persian: اوچ بلاغ) (Note: Also romanized as Owch Bolāgh and Ūch Bolāgh; also known as Uch-Bulag, Ūchbūlāgh, and Uchbulāq) is a village in Qareh Poshtelu-e Bala Rural District of Qareh Poshtelu District in Zanjan County, Zanjan province, Iran.

== Demographics ==
=== Population ===
At the time of the 2006 National Census, the village's population was 223 in 54 households. The following census in 2011 counted 230 people in 57 households. The 2016 census measured the population of the village as 179 people in 55 households.
