= Qarah Gonay-e Sofla =

Qarah Gonay-e Sofla قره گناي سفلي
- Village
- Location within Iran
- Coordinates: 37°06′52″N 47°28′20″E
- Country: Iran
- Province: East Azerbaijan
- County: Charuymaq
- Bakhsh: Shadian
- Rural District: Charuymaq-e Sharqi

Population (2006)
  - Total: 230
- Time zone: UTC+3:30 (IRST)
  - Summer (DST): UTC+4:30 (IRDT)

Qarah Gonay-e Sofla (Persian: قره گناي سفلي, also Romanized as Qarah Gonay-e Soflá; also known as Qarah Gūnī-ye Soflá) is a village in Charuymaq-e Sharqi Rural District, Shadian District, Charuymaq County, East Azerbaijan Province, Iran. At the 2006 census, its population was 230, in 39 families.
