= Meshkin, Zanjan =

Village in Zanjan province, Iran

Meshkin Persian: مشكين
- Village
- Location within Iran
- Coordinates: 37°01′04″N 48°22′39″E
- Country: Iran
- Province: Zanjan
- County: Zanjan
- District: Qareh Poshtelu
- Rural District: Qareh Poshtelu-e Bala

Population (2016)
  - Total: 1,264
- Time zone: UTC+3:30 (IRST)

Meshkin (Persian: مشكين) (Note: Also romanized as Meshkīn; also known as Meshgīn and Mushkin) is a village in Qareh Poshtelu-e Bala Rural District of Qareh Poshtelu District in Zanjan County, Zanjan province, Iran.

== Demographics ==
=== Population ===
At the time of the 2006 National Census, the village's population was 1,321 in 285 households. The following census in 2011 counted 1,280 people in 324 households. The 2016 census measured the population of the village as 1,264 people in 366 households. It was the most populous village in its rural district.
