= Mari, Zanjan =

Village in Zanjan province, Iran

Mari Persian: ماري
- Village
- Location within Iran
- Coordinates: 36°59′55″N 48°28′33″E
- Country: Iran
- Province: Zanjan
- County: Zanjan
- District: Qareh Poshtelu
- Rural District: Qareh Poshtelu-e Bala

Population (2016)
  - Total: 281
- Time zone: UTC+3:30 (IRST)

Mari (Persian: ماري) (Note: Also romanized as Mārī; also known as Maru and Sārī) is a village in Qareh Poshtelu-e Bala Rural District of Qareh Poshtelu District in Zanjan County, Zanjan province, Iran.

== Demographics ==
=== Population ===
At the time of the 2006 National Census, the village's population was 287 in 60 households. The following census in 2011 counted 292 people in 80 households. The 2016 census measured the population of the village as 281 people in 80 households.
