= Agh Bolagh-e Kuranlu =

Village in East Azerbaijan province, Iran

Agh Bolagh-e Kuranlu Persian: اغبلاغ كورانلو
- Village
- Location within Iran
- Coordinates: 36°55′30″N 47°14′13″E
- Country: Iran
- Province: East Azerbaijan
- County: Charuymaq
- District: Shadian
- Rural District: Charuymaq-e Jonubesharqi

Population (2016)
  - Total: 597
- Time zone: UTC+3:30 (IRST)

Agh Bolagh-e Kuranlu (Persian: اغبلاغ كورانلو) (Note: Also romanized as Āgh Bolāgh-e Kūrānlū; also known as Āq Bolāgh, Āqbolāgh, and Āq Bolāgh-e Kūrānlū) is a village in Charuymaq-e Jonubesharqi Rural District of Shadian District in Charuymaq County, East Azerbaijan province, Iran.

== Demographics ==
=== Population ===
At the time of the 2006 National Census, the village's population was 637 in 125 households. The following census in 2011 counted 715 people in 175 households. The 2016 census measured the population of the village as 597 people in 175 households. It was the most populous village in its rural district.
