= Owrtasu =

Village in East Azerbaijan province, Iran

Owrtasu Persian: اورتاسو
- Village
- Location within Iran
- Coordinates: 37°01′30″N 47°25′27″E
- Country: Iran
- Province: East Azerbaijan
- County: Charuymaq
- District: Shadian
- Rural District: Charuymaq-e Sharqi

Population (2016)
  - Total: 1,201
- Time zone: UTC+3:30 (IRST)

Owrtasu (Persian: اورتاسو) (Note: Also romanized as Owrtāsū and Ūrtāsū) is a village in Charuymaq-e Sharqi Rural District of Shadian District in Charuymaq County, East Azerbaijan province, Iran.

== Demographics ==
=== Population ===
At the time of the 2006 National Census, the village's population was 1,029 in 177 households. The following census in 2011 counted 1,278 people in 271 households. The 2016 census measured the population of the village as 1,201 people in 303 households. It was the most populous village in its rural district.
