= Aqcheh Qaleh =

Aqcheh Qaleh (Persian: اقچه قلعه), also rendered as Aqjeh Qaleh or Aghcheh Ghaleh or Aghjeh Qaleh or Akcha-Kalekh or Aqcha Qaleh, may refer to:

- Aqcheh Qaleh, Markazi
- Aqcheh Qaleh, Qazvin
- Aqjeh Qaleh, Zanjan
