= Qaleh-ye Hoseynabad =

Village in East Azerbaijan province, Iran

Qaleh-ye Hoseynabad Persian: قلعه حسين اباد
- Village
- Location within Iran
- Coordinates: 37°09′44″N 47°15′02″E
- Country: Iran
- Province: East Azerbaijan
- County: Charuymaq
- District: Shadian
- Rural District: Charuymaq-e Sharqi

Population (2016)
  - Total: 394
- Time zone: UTC+3:30 (IRST)

Qaleh-ye Hoseynabad (Persian: قلعه حسين اباد) (Note: Also romanized as Qal‘eh-ye Ḩoseynābād) is a village in Charuymaq-e Sharqi Rural District of Shadian District in Charuymaq County, East Azerbaijan province, Iran.

== Demographics ==
=== Population ===
At the time of the 2006 National Census, the village's population was 465 in 78 households. The following census in 2011 counted 415 people in 103 households. The 2016 census measured the population of the village as 394 people in 125 households.
