= Kuranlu =

Kuranlu (Persian: كورانلو) may refer to:

- Kuranlu, East Azerbaijan
- Kuranlu, North Khorasan
