= Aq Kand, Qareh Poshtelu =

Village in Zanjan province, Iran

Aq Kand Persian: اق كند
- Village
- Location within Iran
- Coordinates: 37°03′43″N 48°18′51″E
- Country: Iran
- Province: Zanjan
- County: Zanjan
- District: Qareh Poshtelu
- Rural District: Qareh Poshtelu-e Bala

Population (2016)
  - Total: 99
- Time zone: UTC+3:30 (IRST)

Aq Kand (Persian: اق كند) (Note: Also romanized as Āq Kand and Āqkand; also known as Ak-Kend) is a village in Qareh Poshtelu-e Bala Rural District of Qareh Poshtelu District in Zanjan County, Zanjan province, Iran.

== Demographics ==
=== Population ===
At the time of the 2006 National Census, the village's population was 188 in 50 households. The following census in 2011 counted 127 people in 30 households. The 2016 census measured the population of the village as 99 people in 31 households.
