= Dash Tappeh =

Dash Tappeh (Persian: داش تپه) may refer to:

- Dash Tappeh, West Azerbaijan
- Dash Tappeh, Zanjan
- Dash Tappeh, Khodabandeh, Zanjan Province
