= Qarah Safar =

Village in East Azerbaijan province, Iran

Qarah Safar Persian: قره سفر
- Village
- Location within Iran
- Coordinates: 36°58′51″N 47°07′03″E
- Country: Iran
- Province: East Azerbaijan
- County: Charuymaq
- District: Shadian
- Rural District: Charuymaq-e Jonubesharqi

Population (2016)
  - Total: 202
- Time zone: UTC+3:30 (IRST)

Qarah Safar (Persian: قره سفر) (Note: Also known as Qarah Saqar and Qareh Saqar) is a village in Charuymaq-e Jonubesharqi Rural District of Shadian District in Charuymaq County, East Azerbaijan province, Iran.

== Demographics ==
=== Population ===
At the time of the 2006 National Census, the village's population was 268 in 44 households. The following census in 2011 counted 246 people in 50 households. The 2016 census measured the population of the village as 202 people in 51 households.
