= Pazuki, Iran =

Village in Zanjan province, Iran

Pazuki Persian: پازوکي
- Village
- Location within Iran
- Coordinates: 37°04′50″N 48°32′10″E
- Country: Iran
- Province: Zanjan
- County: Zanjan
- District: Qareh Poshtelu
- Rural District: Qareh Poshtelu-e Bala

Population (2016)
  - Total: 37
- Time zone: UTC+3:30 (IRST)

Pazuki (Persian: پازوکي) (Note: Also known as Darvashtan (دروشتا ن)) is a village in Qareh Poshtelu-e Bala Rural District of Qareh Poshtelu District in Zanjan County, Zanjan province, Iran.

== Demographics ==
=== Population ===
The village did not appear in the National Censuses of 2006 and 2011; however, the 2016 census measured the population of the village as 37 people in 12 households.
