= Degahi =

Village in Zanjan province, Iran

Degahi Persian: دگاهي
- Village
- Location within Iran
- Coordinates: 36°53′57″N 48°31′42″E
- Country: Iran
- Province: Zanjan
- County: Zanjan
- District: Qareh Poshtelu
- Rural District: Soharin

Population (2016)
  - Total: 185
- Time zone: UTC+3:30 (IRST)

Degahi (Persian: دگاهي) (Note: Also romanized as Degāhī; also known as Dagah, Dagāh, Dakāh, Degā, Degakh, and Deqeh) is a village in Soharin Rural District of Qareh Poshtelu District in Zanjan County, Zanjan province, Iran.

== Demographics ==
=== Population ===
At the time of the 2006 National Census, the village's population was 150 in 35 households, when it was in Taham Rural District of the Central District. The following census in 2011 counted 163 people in 43 households. The 2016 census measured the population of the village as 185 people in 56 households, by which time it had been transferred to Soharin Rural District created in Qareh Poshtelu District.
