= Bagh, Zanjan =

Village in Zanjan province, Iran

Bagh Persian: باغ
- Village
- Location within Iran
- Coordinates: 36°58′37″N 48°18′41″E
- Country: Iran
- Province: Zanjan
- County: Zanjan
- District: Qareh Poshtelu
- Rural District: Qareh Poshtelu-e Bala

Population (2016)
  - Total: 298
- Time zone: UTC+3:30 (IRST)

Bagh (Persian: باغ) (Note: Also Romanized as Bāgh; also known as Bag) is a village in Qareh Poshtelu-e Bala Rural District of Qareh Poshtelu District in Zanjan County, Zanjan province, Iran.

== Demographics ==
=== Population ===
According to the 2006 National Census, the population was 321 across 69 households. The 2011 census reported 323 residents in 81 households. The 2016 census recorded a population of 298 people across 78 households.
