= Zarrin Deh, East Azerbaijan =

Zarrin Deh زرين ده
- Village
- Location within Iran
- Coordinates: 36°59′46″N 47°12′52″E
- Country: Iran
- Province: East Azerbaijan
- County: Charuymaq
- Bakhsh: Shadian
- Rural District: Charuymaq-e Jonubesharqi

Population (2006)
  - Total: 33
- Time zone: UTC+3:30 (IRST)
  - Summer (DST): UTC+4:30 (IRDT)

Zarrin Deh (Persian: زرين ده, also Romanized as Zarrīn Deh) is a village in Charuymaq-e Jonubesharqi Rural District, Shadian District, Charuymaq County, East Azerbaijan Province, Iran. At the 2006 census, its population was 33, in 5 families.
