= Soleyman Bolaghi =

Village in Zanjan province, Iran

Soleyman Bolaghi Persian: سليمان بلاغي
- Village
- Location within Iran
- Coordinates: 37°12′26″N 48°10′18″E
- Country: Iran
- Province: Zanjan
- County: Zanjan
- District: Qareh Poshtelu
- Rural District: Qareh Poshtelu-e Pain

Population (2016)
  - Total: 75
- Time zone: UTC+3:30 (IRST)

Soleyman Bolaghi (Persian: سليمان بلاغي) (Note: Also romanized as Soleymān Bolāghī; also known as Soleymān Bolāgh, Soleymānbūlāghī, Sulaimanbulāqi, and Suleyman-Bulag) is a village in Qareh Poshtelu-e Pain Rural District of Qareh Poshtelu District in Zanjan County, Zanjan province, Iran.

== Demographics ==
=== Population ===
At the time of the 2006 National Census, the village's population was 40 in nine households. The following census in 2011 counted 33 people in 11 households. The 2016 census measured the population of the village as 75 people in 32 households.
