= Kabrik =

Village in Zanjan province, Iran

Kabrik Persian: كبريك
- Village
- Location within Iran
- Coordinates: 37°11′28″N 48°22′17″E
- Country: Iran
- Province: Zanjan
- County: Zanjan
- District: Qareh Poshtelu
- Rural District: Qareh Poshtelu-e Pain

Population (2016)
  - Total: 0
- Time zone: UTC+3:30 (IRST)

Kabrik (Persian: كبريك) (Note: Also romanized as Kabrīk; also known as Kaberak, Kavarik, and Kyavaryk) is a village in Qareh Poshtelu-e Pain Rural District of Qareh Poshtelu District in Zanjan County, Zanjan province, Iran.

== Demographics ==
=== Population ===
At the time of the 2006 National Census, the village's population was 16 in four households. The village did not appear in the following census of 2011. The 2016 census measured the population of the village as zero.
