= Jureh Kandi =

Village in Zanjan province, Iran

Jureh Kandi Persian: جوره كندي
- Village
- Location within Iran
- Coordinates: 36°57′50″N 48°15′45″E
- Country: Iran
- Province: Zanjan
- County: Zanjan
- District: Qareh Poshtelu
- Rural District: Qareh Poshtelu-e Bala

Population (2016)
  - Total: 422
- Time zone: UTC+3:30 (IRST)

Jureh Kandi (Persian: جوره‌کندی) (Note: Also romanized as Jūreh Kandī; formerly known as Jūrah Khān (جوره خان)) is a village in Qareh Poshtelu-e Bala Rural District of Qareh Poshtelu District in Zanjan County, Zanjan province, Iran.

== Demographics ==
=== Population ===
At the time of the 2006 National Census, the village's population was 351 in 79 households. The following census in 2011 counted 392 people in 103 households. The 2016 census measured the population of the village as 422 people in 118 households.
