= Ommabad, Zanjan =

Village in Zanjan province, Iran

Ommabad Persian: ام اباد
- Village
- Location within Iran
- Coordinates: 37°13′21″N 48°13′45″E
- Country: Iran
- Province: Zanjan
- County: Zanjan
- District: Qareh Poshtelu
- Rural District: Qareh Poshtelu-e Pain

Population (2016)
  - Total: 51
- Time zone: UTC+3:30 (IRST)

Ommabad (Persian: ام اباد) (Note: Also romanized as Amābād and Ommmābād) is a village in Qareh Poshtelu-e Pain Rural District of Qareh Poshtelu District in Zanjan County, Zanjan province, Iran.

== Demographics ==
=== Population ===
At the time of the 2006 National Census, the village's population was 17 in 10 households. The village did not appear in the following census of 2011. The 2016 census measured the population of the village as 51 people in 21 households.
