= Jazvan, Zanjan =

Village in Zanjan province, Iran

Jazvan Persian: جزوان
- Village
- Location within Iran
- Coordinates: 37°08′48″N 48°29′47″E
- Country: Iran
- Province: Zanjan
- County: Zanjan
- District: Qareh Poshtelu
- Rural District: Qareh Poshtelu-e Pain

Population (2016)
  - Total: 93
- Time zone: UTC+3:30 (IRST)

Jazvan (Persian: جزوان) (Note: Also romanized as Jazvān; also known as Jīzvān) is a village in Qareh Poshtelu-e Pain Rural District of Qareh Poshtelu District in Zanjan County, Zanjan province, Iran.

== Demographics ==
=== Population ===
At the time of the 2006 National Census, the village's population was 37 in eight households. The following census in 2011 counted 104 people in 32 households. The 2016 census measured the population of the village as 93 people in 31 households.
