= Rashtabad, Zanjan =

Village in Zanjan province, Iran

Rashtabad Persian: رشت اباد
- Village
- Location within Iran
- Coordinates: 37°05′52″N 48°23′09″E
- Country: Iran
- Province: Zanjan
- County: Zanjan
- District: Qareh Poshtelu
- Rural District: Qareh Poshtelu-e Pain

Population (2016)
  - Total: 0
- Time zone: UTC+3:30 (IRST)

Rashtabad (Persian: رشت اباد) (Note: Also romanized as Rashtābād and Reshtabad) is a village in Qareh Poshtelu-e Pain Rural District of Qareh Poshtelu District in Zanjan County, Zanjan province, Iran.

== Demographics ==
=== Population ===
At the time of the 2006 National Census, the village's population was 128 in 23 households. The following census in 2011 counted 55 people in 12 households. The 2016 census measured the population of the village as zero.
