= Zarrik =

Village in Zanjan province, Iran

Zarrik Persian: زريك
- Village
- Location within Iran
- Coordinates: 36°58′57″N 48°24′28″E
- Country: Iran
- Province: Zanjan
- County: Zanjan
- District: Qareh Poshtelu
- Rural District: Qareh Poshtelu-e Bala

Population (2016)
  - Total: 93
- Time zone: UTC+3:30 (IRST)

Zarrik (Persian: زريك) (Note: Also romanized as Zarīk and Zarrīk) is a village in Qareh Poshtelu-e Bala Rural District of Qareh Poshtelu District in Zanjan County, Zanjan province, Iran.

== Demographics ==
=== Population ===
At the time of the 2006 National Census, the village's population was 19 in five households. The following census in 2011 counted 32 people in eight households. The 2016 census measured the population of the village as 93 people in 29 households.
