= Qandar Qalu =

Village in Zanjan province, Iran

Qandar Qalu Persian: قندرقالو
- Village
- Location within Iran
- Coordinates: 37°08′10″N 48°18′01″E
- Country: Iran
- Province: Zanjan
- County: Zanjan
- District: Qareh Poshtelu
- Rural District: Qareh Poshtelu-e Pain

Population (2016)
  - Total: 227
- Time zone: UTC+3:30 (IRST)

Qandar Qalu (Persian: قندرقالو) (Note: Also romanized as Qandar Qālū and Qanderqālū; also known as Kardinkali, Qandarqālī, and Qandirqāli) is a village in Qareh Poshtelu-e Pain Rural District of Qareh Poshtelu District in Zanjan County, Zanjan province, Iran.

== Demographics ==
=== Population ===
At the time of the 2006 National Census, the village's population was 258 in 52 households. The following census in 2011 counted 244 people in 69 households. The 2016 census measured the population of the village as 227 people in 64 households.
