= Amuowghli-ye Olya =

Amuowghli-ye Olya عمواوغلي عليا
- Village
- Location within Iran
- Coordinates: 37°03′55″N 47°13′57″E
- Country: Iran
- Province: East Azerbaijan
- County: Charuymaq
- Bakhsh: Shadian
- Rural District: Charuymaq-e Sharqi

Population (2006)
  - Total: 240
- Time zone: UTC+3:30 (IRST)
  - Summer (DST): UTC+4:30 (IRDT)

Amuowghli-ye Olya (Persian: عمواوغلي عليا, also Romanized as ‘Amūowghlī-ye ‘Olyā; also known as ‘Amū Owghlī-ye ‘Abbāslū) is a village in Charuymaq-e Sharqi Rural District, Shadian District, Charuymaq County, East Azerbaijan Province, Iran. At the 2006 census, its population was 240, in 38 families.
