= Jalilabad, Zanjan =

Village in Zanjan province, Iran

Jalilabad Persian: جليل اباد
- Village
- Location within Iran
- Coordinates: 36°59′12″N 48°19′15″E
- Country: Iran
- Province: Zanjan
- County: Zanjan
- District: Qareh Poshtelu
- Rural District: Qareh Poshtelu-e Bala

Population (2016)
  - Total: 266
- Time zone: UTC+3:30 (IRST)

Jalilabad (Persian: جليل اباد) (Note: Also romanized as Jalīlābād; also known as Dzhalalabad and Jalālābād) is a village in Qareh Poshtelu-e Bala Rural District of Qareh Poshtelu District in Zanjan County, Zanjan province, Iran.

== Demographics ==
=== Population ===
At the time of the 2006 National Census, the village's population was 322 in 81 households. The following census in 2011 counted 297 people in 83 households. The 2016 census measured the population of the village as 266 people in 82 households.
