= Chumalu =

Village in Zanjan province, Iran

Chumalu Persian: چومالو
- Village
- Location within Iran
- Coordinates: 37°07′40″N 48°09′17″E
- Country: Iran
- Province: Zanjan
- County: Zanjan
- District: Qareh Poshtelu
- Rural District: Qareh Poshtelu-e Pain

Population (2016)
  - Total: 235
- Time zone: UTC+3:30 (IRST)

Chumalu (Persian: چومالو) (Note: Also romanized as Chūmālū; also known as Chomalu, Chormāl, Chormālū, and Chūmānlū) is a village in Qareh Poshtelu-e Pain Rural District of Qareh Poshtelu District in Zanjan County, Zanjan province, Iran.

== Demographics ==
=== Population ===
At the time of the 2006 National Census, the village's population was 382 in 70 households. The following census in 2011 counted 282 people in 69 households. The 2016 census measured the population of the village as 235 people in 70 households.

== Overview ==
The village is the site of epithermal metal deposits, part of the Tarom-Hashtjin Metallogenic Province, and evidence of "ancient workings and dumps" have been found near hydrothermal veins. The total deposits are estimated at 0.2 megatonnes of lead, zinc, copper, gold, and silver ores. There is a high content of silver and base metals, and a high silver-to-gold ratio. The main gangue minerals are quartz, fluorite, rhodochrosite, and calcite. Other features of the Chumalu deposit include crustiform banding, breccia formation, vuggy textures, and the presence of "pyrite, sphalerite, galena, tetrahedrite, chalcopyrite, minor arsenopyrite, and abundant zinc-manganese-iron carbonate minerals".
