= Aghcheh Mashhad, Charuymaq =

Aghcheh Mashhad اغچه مشهد
- Village
- Location within Iran
- Coordinates: 37°13′38″N 47°23′12″E
- Country: Iran
- Province: East Azerbaijan
- County: Charuymaq
- Bakhsh: Shadian
- Rural District: Charuymaq-e Sharqi

Population (2006)
  - Total: 181
- Time zone: UTC+3:30 (IRST)
  - Summer (DST): UTC+4:30 (IRDT)

Aghcheh Mashhad (Persian: اغچه مشهد, also Romanized as Āghcheh Mashhad; also known as Āghjeh Mashhad) is a village in Charuymaq-e Sharqi Rural District, Shadian District, Charuymaq County, East Azerbaijan Province, Iran. In the 2006 census its population was 181, comprising 34 families.
