= Kord Qeshlaq =

Village in Zanjan province, Iran

Kord Qeshlaq Persian: كردقشلاق
- Village
- Location within Iran
- Coordinates: 36°59′21″N 48°14′11″E
- Country: Iran
- Province: Zanjan
- County: Zanjan
- District: Qareh Poshtelu
- Rural District: Qareh Poshtelu-e Bala

Population (2016)
  - Total: 44
- Time zone: UTC+3:30 (IRST)

Kord Qeshlaq (Persian: كردقشلاق) (Note: Also romanized as Kord Qeshlāq; also known as Gord Qeshlāq, Kord Qeshlāqī, and Kurd-Kishlak) is a village in Qareh Poshtelu-e Bala Rural District of Qareh Poshtelu District in Zanjan County, Zanjan province, Iran.

== Demographics ==
=== Population ===
At the time of the 2006 National Census, the village's population was 50 in nine households. The following census in 2011 counted 52 people in 10 households. The 2016 census measured the population of the village as 44 people in nine households.
