= Kalasar =

Kalasar may refer to:

- Kalasar, Armenia
- Kalasar, Iran
