= Babuneh-ye Sofla =

Babuneh-ye Sofla بابونه سفلي
- Village
- Location within Iran
- Coordinates: 36°59′18″N 47°02′51″E
- Country: Iran
- Province: East Azerbaijan
- County: Charuymaq
- Bakhsh: Shadian
- Rural District: Charuymaq-e Jonubesharqi

Population (2006)
  - Total: 33
- Time zone: UTC+3:30 (IRST)
  - Summer (DST): UTC+4:30 (IRDT)

Babuneh-ye Sofla (Persian: بابونه سفلي, also Romanized as Bābūneh-ye Soflá) is a village in Charuymaq-e Jonubesharqi Rural District, Shadian District, Charuymaq County, East Azerbaijan Province, Iran. At the 2006 census, its population was 33, in 7 families.
