= Dash Tappeh, Zanjan =

Village in Zanjan province, Iran

Dash Tappeh Persian: داش تپه
- Village
- Location within Iran
- Coordinates: 37°02′21″N 48°18′38″E
- Country: Iran
- Province: Zanjan
- County: Zanjan
- District: Qareh Poshtelu
- Rural District: Qareh Poshtelu-e Bala

Population (2016)
  - Total: 251
- Time zone: UTC+3:30 (IRST)

Dash Tappeh (Persian: داش تپه) (Note: Also romanized as Dāsh Tappeh; also known as Dash-Tepe) is a village in Qareh Poshtelu-e Bala Rural District of Qareh Poshtelu District in Zanjan County, Zanjan province, Iran.

== Demographics ==
=== Population ===
At the time of the 2006 National Census, the village's population was 263 in 56 households. The following census in 2011 counted 241 people in 56 households. The 2016 census measured the population of the village as 251 people in 75 households.
