= Aghcheh Kohel =

Aghcheh Kohel (Persian: آغچه كهل) may refer to:

- Aghcheh Kohel, Maragheh, East Azerbaijan Province
- Aghcheh Kohel, Osku, East Azerbaijan Province
- Aghcheh Kohol, Ardabil Province
