= Davah Yataqi =

Village in East Azerbaijan province, Iran

Davah Yataqi Persian: دوه ياتاقي
- Village
- Location within Iran
- Coordinates: 36°56′43″N 47°18′51″E
- Country: Iran
- Province: East Azerbaijan
- County: Charuymaq
- District: Shadian
- Rural District: Charuymaq-e Sharqi

Population (2016)
  - Total: 592
- Time zone: UTC+3:30 (IRST)

Davah Yataqi (Persian: دوه ياتاقي) (Note: Also romanized as Davah Yātāqī; also known as Davah Tāqī and Kūrānlū (کورانلو)) is a village in Charuymaq-e Sharqi Rural District of Shadian District in Charuymaq County, East Azerbaijan province, Iran.

== Demographics ==
=== Population ===
At the time of the 2006 National Census, the village's population was 548 in 72 households. The following census in 2011 counted 605 people in 131 households. The 2016 census measured the population of the village as 592 people in 156 households.
