= Mashkabad-e Sofla =

Village in West Azerbaijan province, Iran

Mashkabad-e Sofla Persian: مشك ابادسفلي
- Village
- Location within Iran
- Coordinates: 37°33′51″N 45°09′47″E
- Country: Iran
- Province: West Azerbaijan
- County: Urmia
- District: Central
- Rural District: Bakeshluchay

Population (2016)
  - Total: 520
- Time zone: UTC+3:30 (IRST)

Mashkabad-e Sofla (Persian: مشك ابادسفلي) (Note: Also romanized as Mashkābād-e Soflá; also known as Mashgābād-e Soflá) is a village in Bakeshluchay Rural District of the Central District in Urmia County, West Azerbaijan province, Iran.

== Demographics ==
=== Population ===
At the time of the 2006 National Census, the village's population was 345 in 93 households. The following census in 2011 counted 127 people in 36 households. The 2016 census measured the population of the village as 520 people in 156 households.
