= Sadaqeh =

Village in West Azerbaijan province, Iran

Sadaqeh Persian: صداقه
- Village
- Location within Iran
- Coordinates: 37°33′25″N 45°07′16″E
- Country: Iran
- Province: West Azerbaijan
- County: Urmia
- District: Central
- Rural District: Bakeshluchay

Population (2016)
  - Total: 533
- Time zone: UTC+3:30 (IRST)

Sadaqeh (Persian: صداقه) (Note: Also romanized as Şadāqeh) is a village in Bakeshluchay Rural District of the Central District in Urmia County, West Azerbaijan province, Iran.

== Demographics ==
=== Population ===
At the time of the 2006 National Census, the village's population was 307 in 85 households. The following census in 2011 counted 365 people in 117 households. The 2016 census measured the population of the village as 533 people in 163 households.
