= Soharin Rural District =

Rural district in Zanjan province, Iran

Soharin Rural District Persian: دهستان سهرين
- Rural District
- Location within Iran
- Coordinates: 36°51′N 48°26′E
- Country: Iran
- Province: Zanjan
- County: Zanjan
- District: Qareh Poshtelu
- Established: 2013
- Capital: Soharin

Population (2016)
  - Total: 6,349
- Time zone: UTC+3:30 (IRST)

Soharin Rural District (Persian: دهستان سهرين) is in Qareh Poshtelu District of Zanjan County, Zanjan province, Iran. Its capital is the village of Soharin.

== History ==
Soharin Rural District was created in Qareh Poshtelu District in 2013.

== Demographics ==
=== Population ===
At the time of the 2016 National Census, the rural district's population was 6,349 in 1,949 households. The most populous of its 16 villages was Soharin, with 2,424 people.

=== Other villages in the rural district ===
- Degahi
- Kord Kandi
- Legahi
- Mahmudabad
- Owrta Bolagh
- Paltalu
- Qeshlaq
- Saremsaqlu
- Valiyaran
- Vananaq
