= Almanabad =

Village in West Azerbaijan province, Iran

Almanabad Persian: المان اباد
- Village
- Location within Iran
- Coordinates: 37°33′17″N 45°08′42″E
- Country: Iran
- Province: West Azerbaijan
- County: Urmia
- District: Central
- Rural District: Bakeshluchay

Population (2016)
  - Total: 508
- Time zone: UTC+3:30 (IRST)

Almanabad (Persian: المان اباد) (Note: Also romanized as Ālmānābād) is a village in Bakeshluchay Rural District of the Central District in Urmia County, West Azerbaijan province, Iran.

== Demographics ==
=== Population ===
At the time of the 2006 National Census, the village's population was 497 in 143 households. The following census in 2011 counted 457 people in 134 households. The 2016 census measured the population of the village as 508 people in 165 households.
