= Aghjeh Dizaj =

Aghjeh Dizaj (Persian: اغجه ديزج) may refer to:

- Aghjeh Dizaj, Maragheh

== See also ==
- Aghcheh Dizaj (disambiguation)
