= Sangar-e Mir Abdollah =

Village in West Azerbaijan province, Iran

Sangar-e Mir Abdollah Persian: سنگرميرعبداله
- Village
- Location within Iran
- Coordinates: 37°33′57″N 45°07′43″E
- Country: Iran
- Province: West Azerbaijan
- County: Urmia
- District: Central
- Rural District: Bakeshluchay

Population (2016)
  - Total: 618
- Time zone: UTC+3:30 (IRST)

Sangar-e Mir Abdollah (Persian: سنگرميرعبداله) (Note: Also romanized as Sangar-e Mīr ‘Abdollāh) is a village in Bakeshluchay Rural District of the Central District in Urmia County, West Azerbaijan province, Iran.

== Demographics ==
=== Population ===
At the time of the 2006 National Census, the village's population was 416 in 112 households. The following census in 2011 counted 411 people in 124 households. The 2016 census measured the population of the village as 618 people in 181 households.
