= Balderlu =

Village in West Azerbaijan province, Iran

Balderlu Persian: بالدرلو
- Village
- Location within Iran
- Coordinates: 37°32′43″N 45°14′37″E
- Country: Iran
- Province: West Azerbaijan
- County: Urmia
- District: Central
- Rural District: Bakeshluchay

Population (2016)
  - Total: 513
- Time zone: UTC+3:30 (IRST)

Balderlu (Persian: بالدرلو) (Note: Also romanized as Bālderlū) is a village in Bakeshluchay Rural District of the Central District in Urmia County, West Azerbaijan province, Iran.

== Demographics ==
=== Population ===
At the time of the 2006 National Census, the village's population was 404 in 111 households. The following census in 2011 counted 416 people in 126 households. The 2016 census measured the population of the village as 513 people in 173 households.
