= Kashtiban =

Village in West Azerbaijan province, Iran

Kashtiban Persian: کشتیبان
- Village
- Location within Iran
- Coordinates: 37°33′14″N 45°14′48″E
- Country: Iran
- Province: West Azerbaijan
- County: Urmia
- District: Central
- Rural District: Bakeshluchay

Population (2016)
  - Total: 915
- Time zone: UTC+3:30 (IRST)

Kashtiban (Persian: کشتیبان) (Note: Also romanized as Kashtībān and Keshtībān) is a village in, and the former capital of, Bakeshluchay Rural District in the Central District of Urmia County, West Azerbaijan province, Iran. The capital of the rural district has been transferred to the village of Emamzadeh.

== Demographics ==
=== Population ===
At the time of the 2006 National Census, the village's population was 992 in 312 households. The following census in 2011 counted 958 people in 324 households. The 2016 census measured the population of the village as 915 people in 355 households.
