= Barajuq =

Village in West Azerbaijan province, Iran

Barajuq Persian: باراجوق
- Village
- Location within Iran
- Coordinates: 37°31′19″N 45°09′56″E
- Country: Iran
- Province: West Azerbaijan
- County: Urmia
- District: Central
- Rural District: Bakeshluchay

Population (2016)
  - Total: 519
- Time zone: UTC+3:30 (IRST)

Barajuq (Persian: باراجوق) (Note: Also romanized as Bārājūq; also known as Pārājūq) is a village in Bakeshluchay Rural District of the Central District in Urmia County, West Azerbaijan province, Iran.

== Demographics ==
=== Population ===
At the time of the 2006 National Census, the village's population was 386 in 68 households. The following census in 2011 counted 477 people in 102 households. The 2016 census measured the population of the village as 519 people in 125 households.
