= Miavaq =

Village in West Azerbaijan province, Iran

Miavaq Persian: مياوق
- Village
- Location within Iran
- Coordinates: 37°33′42″N 45°13′38″E
- Country: Iran
- Province: West Azerbaijan
- County: Urmia
- District: Central
- Rural District: Bakeshluchay

Population (2016)
  - Total: 2,399
- Time zone: UTC+3:30 (IRST)

Miavaq (Persian: مياوق) (Note: Also romanized as Mīāvaq and Mīyāvaq) is a village in Bakeshluchay Rural District of the Central District in Urmia County, West Azerbaijan province, Iran.

== Demographics ==
=== Population ===
At the time of the 2006 National Census, the village's population was 2,049 in 548 households. The following census in 2011 counted 2,320 people in 713 households. The 2016 census measured the population of the village as 2,399 people in 714 households.
