= Reyhanabad, West Azerbaijan =

Village in West Azerbaijan province, Iran

Reyhanabad Persian: ریحان‌آباد Armenian: Ռահւա
- Village
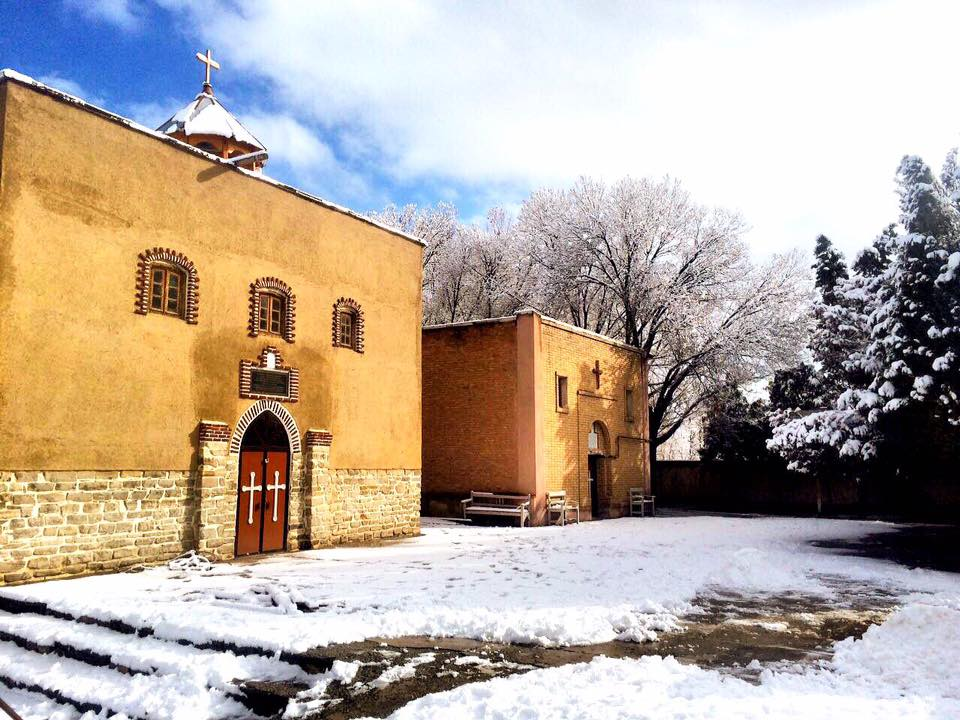
- Assyrian church of St. George (left) and Armenian church of St. Mary (right) in Reyhanabad

- Location within Iran
- Coordinates: 37°34′35″N 45°06′57″E
- Country: Iran
- Province: West Azerbaijan
- County: Urmia
- District: Central
- Rural District: Bakeshluchay

Population (2016)
  - Total: 10,536
- Time zone: UTC+3:30 (IRST)

Reyhanabad (Persian: ریحان‌آباد, romanized: Reyḩānābād; Syriac: Rayhānābād) is a village in Bakeshluchay Rural District of the Central District in Urmia County, West Azerbaijan province, Iran.

There are two churches in this village, built side by side:

- St. George Church (Mar Gevargiz), belonging to Assyrian Church of the East.
- Holy Mother of God (Surp Astvadsadsin), belonging to Armenian Apostolic Church.

== History ==
Basil Nikitin, the Russian consul at Urmia, noted that Rayhānābād was entirely populated by Christians just before the First World War. It was located in the Baranduz district. It was inhabited by 79 Church of the East Christian families in 1914 when visited by the priest Mirzā Benjamin Kaldāni.

== Demographics ==
=== Population ===
At the time of the 2006 National Census, the village's population was 6,125 in 1,530 households. The following census in 2011 counted 8,497 people in 2,371 households. The 2016 census measured the population of the village as 10,536 people in 2,992 households. It was the most populous village in its rural district.

== Bibliography ==
- Wilmshurst, David (2000). The Ecclesiastical Organisation of the Church of the East, 1318–1913 (PDF). Peeters Publishers.
