= Kalasar, Iran =

Village in Zanjan province, Iran

Kalasar Persian: كلاسر
- Village
- Location within Iran
- Coordinates: 37°05′11″N 48°30′12″E
- Country: Iran
- Province: Zanjan
- County: Zanjan
- District: Qareh Poshtelu
- Rural District: Qareh Poshtelu-e Bala

Population (2016)
  - Total: 19
- Time zone: UTC+3:30 (IRST)

Kalasar (Persian: كلاسر) (Note: Also romanized as Kalāsar; also known as Kaleh Sār and Kalleh Sār) is a village in Qareh Poshtelu-e Bala Rural District of Qareh Poshtelu District in Zanjan County, Zanjan province, Iran.

== Demographics ==
=== Language ===
The people of the village speak Azerbaijani Turkish and Tat.

=== Population ===
At the time of the 2006 National Census, the village's population was 54 in 13 households. The following census in 2011 counted 40 people in 13 households. The 2016 census measured the population of the village as 19 people in six households.
