= Aghcheh Dizaj =

Aghcheh Dizaj or Aghchehdizaj or Aghcheh Dizej (Persian: اغچه ديزج) may refer to:

- Aghcheh Dizaj, Malekan
- Aghcheh Dizej, Maragheh

== See also ==
- Aghjeh Dizaj (disambiguation)
