= Aqjeh Qaleh, Zanjan =

Village in Zanjan province, Iran

Aqjeh Qaleh Persian: اقجه قلعه
- Village
- Location within Iran
- Coordinates: 37°06′47″N 48°11′01″E
- Country: Iran
- Province: Zanjan
- County: Zanjan
- District: Qareh Poshtelu
- Rural District: Qareh Poshtelu-e Pain

Population (2016)
  - Total: 169
- Time zone: UTC+3:30 (IRST)

Aqjeh Qaleh (Persian: اقجه قلعه) (Note: Also romanized as Āqjeh Qal‘eh and Aqjeh Qal‘eh; also known as Āghjeh Qal‘eh, Akcha-Kalekh, Aqcha Qal‘eh, and Āqcheh Qal‘eh) is a village in Qareh Poshtelu-e Pain Rural District of Qareh Poshtelu District in Zanjan County, Zanjan province, Iran.

== Demographics ==
=== Population ===
At the time of the 2006 National Census, the village's population was 315 in 82 households. The following census in 2011 counted 202 people in 58 households. The 2016 census measured the population of the village as 169 people in 57 households.
