= Yuvalar =

Village in West Azerbaijan province, Iran

Yuvalar Persian: يوالار
- Village
- Location within Iran
- Coordinates: 37°33′45″N 45°15′19″E
- Country: Iran
- Province: West Azerbaijan
- County: Urmia
- District: Central
- Rural District: Bakeshluchay

Population (2016)
  - Total: 553
- Time zone: UTC+3:30 (IRST)

Yuvalar (Persian: يوالار) (Note: Also romanized as Yūvālār) is a village in Bakeshluchay Rural District of the Central District in Urmia County, West Azerbaijan province, Iran.

== Demographics ==
=== Population ===
At the time of the 2006 National Census, the village's population was 622 in 174 households. The following census in 2011 counted 608 people in 188 households. The 2016 census measured the population of the village as 553 people in 186 households.
