= Qebleh Bolaghi, Zanjan =

Village in Zanjan province, Iran

Qebleh Bolaghi Persian: قبله بلاغی
- Village
- Location within Iran
- Coordinates: 37°06′58″N 48°16′41″E
- Country: Iran
- Province: Zanjan
- County: Zanjan
- District: Qareh Poshtelu
- Rural District: Qareh Poshtelu-e Pain

Population (2016)
  - Total: 248
- Time zone: UTC+3:30 (IRST)

Qebleh Bolaghi (Persian: قبله بلاغی) (Note: Also romanized as Qebleh Bolāghī; also known as Kiblag-Bulag, Qebleh Būlāgh, and Qiblahbulāq) is a village in, and the capital of, Qareh Poshtelu-e Pain Rural District in Qareh Poshtelu District of Zanjan County, Zanjan province, Iran.

== Demographics ==
=== Population ===
At the time of the 2006 National Census, the village's population was 266 in 45 households. The following census in 2011 counted 297 people in 48 households. The 2016 census measured the population of the village as 248 people in 66 households.
