= Qareh Poshtelu-e Pain Rural District =

Rural district in Zanjan province, Iran

Qareh Poshtelu-e Pain Rural District Persian: دهستان قره‌پشتلو پایین
- Rural District
- Location within Iran
- Coordinates: 37°10′N 48°20′E
- Country: Iran
- Province: Zanjan
- County: Zanjan
- District: Qareh Poshtelu
- Established: 1987
- Capital: Qebleh Bolaghi

Population (2016)
  - Total: 2,324
- Time zone: UTC+3:30 (IRST)

Qareh Poshtelu-e Pain Rural District (Persian: دهستان قره‌پشتلو پایین) is in Qareh Poshtelu District of Zanjan County, Zanjan province, Iran. Its capital is the village of Qebleh Bolaghi.

== Demographics ==
=== Population ===
At the time of the 2006 National Census, the rural district's population was 3,238 in 684 households. There were 2,654 inhabitants in 669 households at the following census of 2011. The 2016 census measured the population of the rural district as 2,324 in 733 households. The most populous of its 33 villages was Hajj Siran, with 321 people.

=== Other villages in the rural district ===
- Ahmadabad
- Aqjeh Qaleh
- Birundeh
- Chumalu
- Dash Bolagh
- Jazimaq
- Jazvan
- Kabrik
- Kalhin
- Lahargin
- Ommabad
- Qandar Qalu
- Qarah Hesarlu
- Rashtabad
- Salarabad
- Soleyman Bolaghi
- Varmazyar-e Olya
- Varmazyar-e Sofla
