= Emamzadeh, West Azerbaijan =

Village in West Azerbaijan province, Iran

Emamzadeh Persian: امامزاده
- Village
- Location within Iran
- Coordinates: 37°31′46″N 45°12′26″E
- Country: Iran
- Province: West Azerbaijan
- County: Urmia
- District: Central
- Rural District: Bakeshluchay

Population (2016)
  - Total: 472
- Time zone: UTC+3:30 (IRST)

Emamzadeh (Persian: امامزاده) (Note: Also romanized as Emāmzādeh) is a village in, and the capital of, Bakeshluchay Rural District in the Central District of Urmia County, West Azerbaijan province, Iran. The previous capital of the rural district was the village of Kashtiban.

== Demographics ==
=== Population ===
At the time of the 2006 National Census, the village's population was 522 in 150 households. The following census in 2011 counted 557 people in 181 households. The 2016 census measured the population of the village as 472 people in 174 households.
