= Varmazyar-e Olya =

Village in Zanjan province, Iran

Varmazyar-e Olya Persian: ورمزیار علیا
- Village
- Location within Iran
- Coordinates: 37°09′25″N 48°15′37″E
- Country: Iran
- Province: Zanjan
- County: Zanjan
- District: Qareh Poshtelu
- Rural District: Qareh Poshtelu-e Pain

Population (2016)
  - Total: 194
- Time zone: UTC+3:30 (IRST)

Varmazyar-e Olya (Persian: ورمزیار علیا) (Note: Also romanized as Varmazyār-e ‘Olyā; also known as Varmaziar and Varmazyār) is a village in Qareh Poshtelu-e Pain Rural District of Qareh Poshtelu District in Zanjan County, Zanjan province, Iran.

== Demographics ==
=== Population ===
At the time of the 2006 National Census, the village's population was 263 in 49 households. The following census in 2011 counted 249 people in 65 households. The 2016 census measured the population of the village as 194 people in 62 households.
