= Kordlar, West Azerbaijan =

Village in West Azerbaijan province, Iran

Kordlar Persian: كردلر
- Village
- Location within Iran
- Coordinates: 37°33′57″N 45°13′04″E
- Country: Iran
- Province: West Azerbaijan
- County: Urmia
- District: Central
- Rural District: Bakeshluchay

Population (2016)
  - Total: 786
- Time zone: UTC+3:30 (IRST)

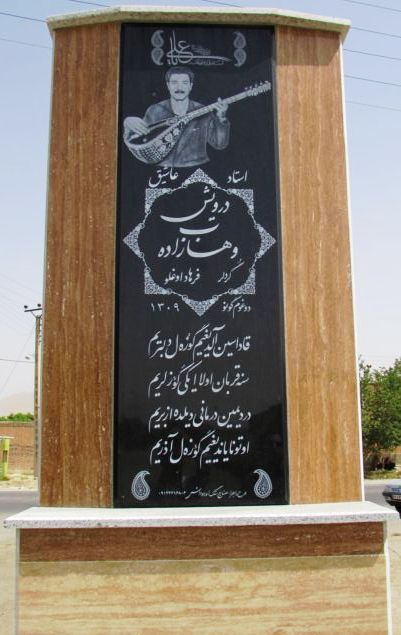

Kordlar (Persian: كردلر) is a village in Bakeshluchay Rural District of the Central District in Urmia County, West Azerbaijan province, Iran.

== Demographics ==
=== Population ===
At the time of the 2006 National Census, the village's population was 900 in 269 households. The following census in 2011 counted 824 people in 255 households. The 2016 census measured the population of the village as 786 people in 258 households.
