= Posht-e Gol, West Azerbaijan =

Posht-e Gol پشتگل
- Village
- Location within Iran
- Coordinates: 37°33′29″N 45°12′15″E
- Country: Iran
- Province: West Azerbaijan
- County: Urmia
- Bakhsh: Central
- Rural District: Bakeshluchay

Population (2006)
  - Total: 191
- Time zone: UTC+3:30 (IRST)
  - Summer (DST): UTC+4:30 (IRDT)

Posht-e Gol (Persian: پشتگل) is a village in Bakeshluchay Rural District, in the Central District of Urmia County, West Azerbaijan Province, Iran. At the 2006 census, its population was 191, in 60 families.
