= Varmazyar-e Sofla =

Village in Zanjan province, Iran

Varmazyar-e Sofla Persian: ورمزیار سفلی
- Village
- Location within Iran
- Coordinates: 37°10′34″N 48°16′16″E
- Country: Iran
- Province: Zanjan
- County: Zanjan
- District: Qareh Poshtelu
- Rural District: Qareh Poshtelu-e Pain

Population (2016)
  - Total: 58
- Time zone: UTC+3:30 (IRST)

Varmazyar-e Sofla (Persian: ورمزیار سفلی) (Note: Also romanized as Varmazyār-e Soflá; also known as Varmaziar and Varmazyār) is a village in Qareh Poshtelu-e Pain Rural District of Qareh Poshtelu District in Zanjan County, Zanjan province, Iran.

== Demographics ==
=== Population ===
At the time of the 2006 National Census, the village's population was 97 in 23 households. The following census in 2011 counted 88 people in 17 households. The 2016 census measured the population of the village as 58 people in 19 households.
