= Amuowghli-ye Sofla =

Village in East Azerbaijan province, Iran

Amuowghli-ye Sofla Persian: عمواوغلي سفلي
- Village
- Location within Iran
- Coordinates: 37°05′07″N 47°15′28″E
- Country: Iran
- Province: East Azerbaijan
- County: Charuymaq
- District: Shadian
- Rural District: Charuymaq-e Sharqi

Population (2016)
  - Total: 436
- Time zone: UTC+3:30 (IRST)

Amuowghli-ye Sofla (Persian: عمواوغلي سفلي) (Note: Also romanized as ‘Amū Owghlī-ye Soflá and ‘Amūowghlī-ye Soflá; also known as Amū Oghlī, ‘Amū Owghlī Pā’īn, and ‘Amūowghlī-ye Pā’īn) is a village in Charuymaq-e Sharqi Rural District of Shadian District in Charuymaq County, East Azerbaijan province, Iran.

== Demographics ==
=== Population ===
At the time of the 2006 National Census, the village's population was 339 in 57 households. The following census in 2011 counted 372 people in 85 households. The 2016 census measured the population of the village as 436 people in 123 households.
