= Aghcheh Mashhad, Maragheh =

Aghcheh Mashhad اغچه مشهد
- Village
- Location within Iran
- Coordinates: 37°09′28″N 46°22′04″E
- Country: Iran
- Province: East Azerbaijan
- County: Maragheh
- Bakhsh: Saraju
- Rural District: Sarajuy-ye Jonubi

Population (2006)
  - Total: 75
- Time zone: UTC+3:30 (IRST)
  - Summer (DST): UTC+4:30 (IRDT)

Aghcheh Mashhad (Persian: اغچه مشهد, also Romanized as Āghcheh Mashhad; also known as Pasīānlū, Āghcheh Mashhad-e Pasānlū, and Āghcheh Mashhad-e Pasātlū) is a village in Sarajuy-ye Jonubi Rural District, Saraju District, Maragheh County, East Azerbaijan Province, Iran. At the 2006 census, its population was 75, in 17 families.
