= Varmazyar, Showt =

Varmazyar ورمزيار
- Village
- Location within Iran
- Coordinates: 39°17′31″N 44°53′41″E
- Country: Iran
- Province: West Azerbaijan
- County: Showt
- Bakhsh: Central
- Rural District: Yowla Galdi

Population (2006)
  - Total: 73
- Time zone: UTC+3:30 (IRST)
  - Summer (DST): UTC+4:30 (IRDT)

Varmazyar (Persian: ورمزيار, also Romanized as Varmazyār) is a village in Yowla Galdi Rural District, in the Central District of Showt County, West Azerbaijan Province, Iran. At the 2006 census, its population was 73, in 20 families.
