= Aghcheh Darband =

Aghcheh Darband اغچه دربند
- Village
- Location within Iran
- Coordinates: 37°27′00″N 47°30′15″E
- Country: Iran
- Province: East Azerbaijan
- County: Meyaneh
- Bakhsh: Central
- Rural District: Owch Tappeh-ye Sharqi

Population (2006)
  - Total: 64
- Time zone: UTC+3:30 (IRST)
  - Summer (DST): UTC+4:30 (IRDT)

Aghcheh Darband (Persian: اغچه دربند, also Romanized as Āghcheh Darband; also known as Āqjeh Darband) is a village in Owch Tappeh-ye Sharqi Rural District, in the Central District of Meyaneh County, East Azerbaijan Province, Iran. At the 2006 census, its population was 64, in 11 families.
