= Aghancheh =

Aghancheh اغنچه
- Village
- Location within Iran
- Coordinates: 29°24′01″N 57°51′04″E
- Country: Iran
- Province: Kerman
- County: Bam
- Bakhsh: Central
- Rural District: Howmeh

Population (2006)
  - Total: 140
- Time zone: UTC+3:30 (IRST)
  - Summer (DST): UTC+4:30 (IRDT)

Aghancheh (Persian: اغنچه, also Romanized as Āghancheh; also known as Āghcheh) is a village in Howmeh Rural District, in the Central District of Bam County, Kerman Province, Iran. At the 2006 census, its population was 140, in 37 families.
