= Tall Babineh =

Tall Babineh تل بابينه
- Village
- Location within Iran
- Coordinates: 30°41′50″N 50°44′12″E
- Country: Iran
- Province: Kohgiluyeh and Boyer-Ahmad
- County: Charam
- Bakhsh: Central
- Rural District: Charam

Population (2006)
  - Total: 253
- Time zone: UTC+3:30 (IRST)
  - Summer (DST): UTC+4:30 (IRDT)

Tall Babineh (Persian: تل بابينه, also Romanized as Tall Bābīneh; also known as Bābūneh, Tall Bābūneh, and Tol Bābūneh) is a village in Charam Rural District, in the Central District of Charam County, Kohgiluyeh and Boyer-Ahmad Province, Iran. At the 2006 census, its population was 253, in 41 families.
