= Qebleh Bolaghi, Kurdistan =

Qebleh Bolaghi قبله بلاغی
- Village
- Location within Iran
- Coordinates: 36°22′11″N 46°18′28″E
- Country: Iran
- Province: Kurdistan
- County: Saqqez
- Bakhsh: Central
- Rural District: Sara

Population (2006)
  - Total: 61
- Time zone: UTC+3:30 (IRST)
  - Summer (DST): UTC+4:30 (IRDT)

Qebleh Bolaghi (Persian: قبله بلاغی, also Romanized as Qebleh Bolāghī) is a village in Sara Rural District, in the Central District of Saqqez County, Kurdistán province, Iran. At the 2006 census, its population was 61. The village is populated by Kurds.
