= Aqcheh Qaleh, Qazvin =

Aqcheh Qaleh اقچه قلعه
- Village
- Location within Iran
- Coordinates: 35°47′43″N 49°15′24″E
- Country: Iran
- Province: Qazvin
- County: Avaj
- Bakhsh: Abgarm
- Rural District: Abgarm

Population (2006)
  - Total: 117
- Time zone: UTC+3:30 (IRST)
  - Summer (DST): UTC+4:30 (IRDT)

Aqcheh Qaleh (Persian: اقچه قلعه, also Romanized as Āqcheh Qal‘eh, Aghcheh Ghal’eh, Agja Qal‘eh, and Āqjeh Qal‘eh) is a village in Abgarm Rural District, Abgarm District, Avaj County, Qazvin Province, Iran. At the 2006 census, its population was 117, in 31 families.
