= Aghcheh Qayah =

Aghcheh Qayah اقچه قيه
- Village
- Location within Iran
- Coordinates: 35°21′00″N 48°20′33″E
- Country: Iran
- Province: Hamadan
- County: Kabudarahang
- Bakhsh: Gol Tappeh
- Rural District: Ali Sadr

Population (2006)
  - Total: 357
- Time zone: UTC+3:30 (IRST)
  - Summer (DST): UTC+4:30 (IRDT)

Aghcheh Qayah (Persian: اقچه قيه (Note: also Romanized as Āghcheh Qayah and Āghcheh Qeyeh; also known as Aghcheh Ghīyeh, Āghjeh Qayeh, Aqchīgayeh, Āqjeh Qayeh, Āqjeh Qeyeh, and Āqjeh Qīyah)) is a village in Ali Sadr Rural District, Gol Tappeh District, Kabudarahang County, Hamadan Province, Iran. At the 2006 census, its population was 357, in 83 families.
