= Aghcheh Qaleh =

Village in West Azerbaijan province, Iran

Aghcheh Qaleh Persian: اغچه قلعه
- Village
- Location within Iran
- Coordinates: 37°32′29″N 45°07′51″E
- Country: Iran
- Province: West Azerbaijan
- County: Urmia
- District: Central
- Rural District: Bakeshluchay

Population (2016)
  - Total: 1,238
- Time zone: UTC+3:30 (IRST)

Aghcheh Qaleh (Persian: اغچه قلعه, romanized: Āghcheh Qal‘eh) (Note: Also known as Āḡǰa-qaḷʿa.) is a village in Bakeshluchay Rural District of the Central District in Urmia County, West Azerbaijan province, Iran. The village has at least one Armenian church.

== Demographics ==
=== Population ===
At the time of the 2006 National Census, the village's population was 903 in 224 households. The following census in 2011 counted 860 people in 234 households. The 2016 census measured the population of the village as 1,238 people in 341 households.

== Bibliography ==
- Amurian, Andre; Kasheff, Manouchehr (1986). "ARMENIANS OF MODERN IRAN". In Yarshater, Ehsan (ed.). Encyclopædia Iranica (Online ed.). Encyclopædia Iranica Foundation.
