= Aghcheh Rish, Hashtrud =

Aghcheh Rish اغچه ريش
- Village
- Location within Iran
- Coordinates: 37°14′00″N 46°43′51″E
- Country: Iran
- Province: East Azerbaijan
- County: Hashtrud
- Bakhsh: Nazarkahrizi
- Rural District: Nazarkahrizi

Population (2006)
  - Total: 39
- Time zone: UTC+3:30 (IRST)
  - Summer (DST): UTC+4:30 (IRDT)

Aghcheh Rish (Persian: اغچه ريش, also Romanized as Āghcheh Rīsh) is a village in Nazarkahrizi Rural District, Nazarkahrizi District, Hashtrud County, East Azerbaijan Province, Iran. At the 2006 census, its population was 39, in 8 families.
