= Qareh Guni, Khoda Afarin =

Qareh Guni قره گوني
- Village
- Location within Iran
- Coordinates: 38°53′28″N 46°53′01″E
- Country: Iran
- Province: East Azerbaijan
- County: Khoda Afarin
- Bakhsh: Minjavan
- Rural District: Minjavan-e Sharqi

Population (2006)
  - Total: 53
- Time zone: UTC+3:30 (IRST)
  - Summer (DST): UTC+4:30 (IRDT)

Qareh Guni (Persian: قره گوني, also Romanized as Qareh Gūnī) is a village in Minjavan-e Sharqi Rural District, Minjavan District, Khoda Afarin County, East Azerbaijan Province, Iran. At the 2006 census, its population was 53, in 13 families. The village is populated by the Kurdish Mohammad Khanlu tribe.
