= Agjeh =

Agjeh اگجه
- Village
- Location within Iran
- Coordinates: 35°46′43″N 46°26′39″E
- Country: Iran
- Province: Kurdistan
- County: Marivan
- Bakhsh: Sarshiv
- Rural District: Sarshiv

Population (2006)
  - Total: 41
- Time zone: UTC+3:30 (IRST)
  - Summer (DST): UTC+4:30 (IRDT)

Agjeh (Persian: اگجه, also Romanized as Āgjeh; also known as Akcheh, Āqcheh, Āqjeh, Augajeh, and Ūgjeh) is a village in Sarshiv Rural District, Sarshiv District, Marivan County, Kurdistan Province, Iran. At the 2006 census, its population was 41, in 7 families. The village is populated by Kurds.
