= Paletlu, East Azerbaijan =

Paletlu پالتلو
- Village
- Location within Iran
- Coordinates: 39°06′01″N 47°09′12″E
- Country: Iran
- Province: East Azerbaijan
- County: Kaleybar
- Bakhsh: Central
- Rural District: Mulan

Population (2006)
  - Total: 82
- Time zone: UTC+3:30 (IRST)
  - Summer (DST): UTC+4:30 (IRDT)

Paletlu (Persian: پالتلو, also Romanized as Pāletlū) is a village in Mulan Rural District, in the Central District of Kaleybar County, East Azerbaijan Province, Iran. At the 2006 census, its population was 82, in 17 families.
