= Tekmeh Dash, Zanjan =

Village in Zanjan province, Iran

Tekmeh Dash Persian: تكمه داش
- Village
- Location within Iran
- Coordinates: 37°03′34″N 48°12′19″E
- Country: Iran
- Province: Zanjan
- County: Zanjan
- District: Qareh Poshtelu
- Rural District: Qareh Poshtelu-e Bala

Population (2016)
  - Total: 242
- Time zone: UTC+3:30 (IRST)

Tekmeh Dash (Persian: تكمه داش) (Note: Also romanized as Tekmeh Dāsh; also known as Nīkmeh Dāsh, Tīkmeh Dāsh, Tukmahdāsh, Tukmakhdash, and Tūkmeh Dāsh) is a village in Qareh Poshtelu-e Bala Rural District of Qareh Poshtelu District in Zanjan County, Zanjan province, Iran.

== Demographics ==
=== Population ===
At the time of the 2006 National Census, the village's population was 497 in 110 households. The following census in 2011 counted 385 people in 102 households. The 2016 census measured the population of the village as 242 people in 84 households.
