= Aghcheh Kandi =

Aghcheh Kandi اغچه كندي
- Village
- Location within Iran
- Coordinates: 37°30′53″N 46°48′24″E
- Country: Iran
- Province: East Azerbaijan
- County: Hashtrud
- Bakhsh: Central
- Rural District: Qaranqu

Population (2006)
  - Total: 267
- Time zone: UTC+3:30 (IRST)
  - Summer (DST): UTC+4:30 (IRDT)

Aghcheh Kandi (Persian: اغچه كندي, also Romanized as Āghcheh Kandī; also known as Agchen Kandi, Āghjeh Kandī, and Akhcha Kand) is a village in Qaranqu Rural District, in the Central District of Hashtrud County, East Azerbaijan Province, Iran. At the 2006 census, its population was 267, in 61 families.
