= Aghcheh Mashhad-e Char Dowli =

Aghcheh Mashhad-e Char Dowli اغچه مشهدچاردولي
- Village
- Location within Iran
- Coordinates: 37°11′00″N 46°18′51″E
- Country: Iran
- Province: East Azerbaijan
- County: Malekan
- Bakhsh: Central
- Rural District: Gavdul-e Sharqi

Population (2006)
  - Total: 72
- Time zone: UTC+3:30 (IRST)

Aghcheh Mashhad-e Char Dowli (Persian: اغچه مشهدچاردولي, also Romanized as Āghcheh Mashhad-e Chār Dowlī; also known as Āghcheh Mashhad and Āghcheh Mashhad-e Chahār Dowlī) is a village in Gavdul-e Sharqi Rural District, in the Central District of Malekan County, East Azerbaijan Province, Iran. At the 2006 census, its population was 72, in 20 families.
