= Aghcheh Kohel, Osku =

Aghcheh Kohel اقچه كهل
- Village
- Location within Iran
- Coordinates: 37°48′30″N 46°07′33″E
- Country: Iran
- Province: East Azerbaijan
- County: Osku
- Bakhsh: Central
- Rural District: Gonbar

Population (2006)
  - Total: 233
- Time zone: UTC+3:30 (IRST)
  - Summer (DST): UTC+4:30 (IRDT)

Aghcheh Kohel (Persian: اقچه كهل, also Romanized as Āghcheh Kohel; also known as Āqcheh Kohel) is a village in Gonbar Rural District, in the Central District of Osku County, East Azerbaijan Province, Iran. At the 2006 census, its population was 233, in 53 families.
