= Aghcheh Rish, Charuymaq =

Village in East Azerbaijan province, Iran

Aghcheh Rish Persian: اغچه ريش
- Village
- Location within Iran
- Coordinates: 37°04′57″N 47°22′03″E
- Country: Iran
- Province: East Azerbaijan
- County: Charuymaq
- District: Shadian
- Rural District: Charuymaq-e Sharqi

Population (2016)
  - Total: 384
- Time zone: UTC+3:30 (IRST)

Aghcheh Rish (Persian: اغچه ريش) (Note: Also romanized as Āghcheh Rīsh; also known as Āghjeh Rīsh and Āghjeh Rīsh Kūrānlū) is a village in Charuymaq-e Sharqi Rural District of Shadian District in Charuymaq County, East Azerbaijan province, Iran, serving as capital of both the district and the rural district.

== Demographics ==
=== Population ===
At the time of the 2006 National Census, the village's population was 389 in 59 households. The following census in 2011 counted 409 people in 90 households. The 2016 census measured the population of the village as 384 people in 112 households.
