= Aghcheh Ziveh =

Aghcheh Ziveh اغچه زيوه
- Village
- Location within Iran
- Coordinates: 36°58′45″N 45°22′25″E
- Country: Iran
- Province: West Azerbaijan
- County: Naqadeh
- Bakhsh: Central
- Rural District: Solduz

Population (2006)
  - Total: 25
- Time zone: UTC+3:30 (IRST)
  - Summer (DST): UTC+4:30 (IRDT)

Aghcheh Ziveh (Persian: اغچه زيوه, also Romanized as Āghcheh Zīveh) is a village in Solduz Rural District, in the Central District of Naqadeh County, West Azerbaijan Province, Iran. At the 2006 census, its population was 25, in 7 families.
