= Aghcheh Bolagh =

Aghcheh Bolagh اغچه بلاغ
- Village
- Location within Iran
- Coordinates: 33°51′06″N 49°12′33″E
- Country: Iran
- Province: Markazi
- County: Shazand
- Bakhsh: Sarband
- Rural District: Hendudar

Population (2006)
  - Total: 96
- Time zone: UTC+3:30 (IRST)
  - Summer (DST): UTC+4:30 (IRDT)

Aghcheh Bolagh (Persian: اغچه بلاغ, also Romanized as Āghcheh Bolāgh; also known as Āqbulāgh, Āq Bulāq, Āqcheh Bolāgh, and Āqjeh Bolāgh) is a village in Hendudar Rural District, Sarband District, Shazand County, Markazi Province, Iran. At the 2006 census, its population was 96, in 26 families.
