= Armaghankhaneh =

City in Zanjan province, Iran

Armaghankhaneh ارمغانخانه (Persian)
- City
- Location within Iran
- Coordinates: 36°58′41″N 48°22′24″E
- Country: Iran
- Province: Zanjan
- County: Zanjan
- District: Qareh Poshtelu
- Established: 2008

Population (2016)
  - Total: 2,149
- Time zone: UTC+3:30 (IRST)

Armaghankhaneh (Persian: ارمغانخانه) (Note: Also romanized as Armaghānkhāna or Armaqânxâne; also known as Arāmkhāna or and Mazra'eh-ye Qareh Dāsh.) is a city in, and the capital of, Qareh Poshtelu District in Zanjan County, Zanjan province, Iran. It also serves as the administrative center for Qareh Poshtelu-e Bala Rural District.

== Demographics ==
=== Population ===
At the time of the 2006 National Census, Armaghankhaneh's population was 1,581 in 376 households, when it was a village in Qareh Poshtelu-e Bala Rural District. The following census in 2011 counted 1,945 people in 449 households, by which time the village had been converted to a city. The 2016 census measured the population of the city as 2,149 people in 572 households.
