= Shur Tappeh, Afghanistan =

Shur Tappeh
- Location in Afghanistan
- Coordinates: 37°20′10″N 66°49′12″E
- Country: Afghanistan
- Province: Balkh Province
- Time zone: + 4.30

Shur Tappeh is a village in Balkh Province in northern Afghanistan.

== See also ==
- Balkh Province
