= Aghcheh, Isfahan =

Village in Isfahan province, Iran

Aghcheh Persian: اغچه
- Village
- Location within Iran
- Coordinates: 33°04′45″N 50°03′21″E
- Country: Iran
- Province: Isfahan
- County: Buin Miandasht
- District: Central
- Rural District: Yeylaq

Population (2016)
  - Total: 934
- Time zone: UTC+3:30 (IRST)

Aghcheh (Persian: آغچه) (Note: Also known as Āghcha, Āghche, Ākhcha, Ākhche, or Ākhchia) is a village in Yeylaq Rural District of the Central District in Buin Miandasht County, Isfahan province, Iran.

== Demographics ==
=== Language ===
The town is about 60% Georgian speaking, 20% Luri speaking and the rest being standard Persian.

=== Population ===
At the time of the 2006 National Census, the village's population was 995 in 223 households, when it was in the former Buin Miandasht District of Faridan County. The following census in 2011 counted 1,231 people in 361 households. The 2016 census measured the population of the village as 934 people in 311 households, by which time the district had been separated from the county in the establishment of Buin Miandasht County. The rural district was transferred to the new Central District. Aghcheh was the most populous village in its rural district.
