= Aghcheh Dizej, Maragheh =

Village in East Azerbaijan province, Iran

Aghcheh Dizej Persian: اغچه ديزج
- Village
- Location within Iran
- Coordinates: 37°09′23″N 46°24′29″E
- Country: Iran
- Province: East Azerbaijan
- County: Maragheh
- District: Saraju
- Rural District: Sarajuy-ye Jonubi

Population (2016)
  - Total: 341
- Time zone: UTC+3:30 (IRST)

Aghcheh Dizej (Persian: اغچه ديزج) (Note: Also romanized as Āghcheh Dīzej; also known as Āghjeh Dīzaj, Āghjeh Dīzeh, Āqchehdīzeh, and Āqjeh Dīzeh) is a village in Sarajuy-ye Jonubi Rural District of Saraju District in Maragheh County, East Azerbaijan province, Iran.

== Demographics ==
=== Population ===
At the time of the 2006 National Census, the village's population was 343 in 61 households. The following census in 2011 counted 306 people in 75 households. The 2016 census measured the population of the village as 341 people in 114 households.
