= Aghcheh Rud =

Aghcheh Rud اغچه رود
- Village
- Location within Iran
- Coordinates: 37°31′05″N 46°55′36″E
- Country: Iran
- Province: East Azerbaijan
- County: Hashtrud
- Bakhsh: Central
- Rural District: Qaranqu

Population (2006)
  - Total: 364
- Time zone: UTC+3:30 (IRST)
  - Summer (DST): UTC+4:30 (IRDT)

Aghcheh Rud (Persian: اغچه رود, also Romanized as Āghcheh Rūd; also known as Aga Jari, Āghjeh Rūd, Āqā Jarī, and Aqājri) is a village in Qaranqu Rural District, in the Central District of Hashtrud County, East Azerbaijan Province, Iran.

== Census ==
At the 2006 census, its population was 364, in 91 families.
