= Tikmeh Dash, Hashtrud =

Tikmeh Dash تيكمه داش
- Village
- Location within Iran
- Coordinates: 37°15′45″N 46°43′54″E
- Country: Iran
- Province: East Azerbaijan
- County: Hashtrud
- Bakhsh: Nazarkahrizi
- Rural District: Nazarkahrizi

Population (2006)
  - Total: 71
- Time zone: UTC+3:30 (IRST)
  - Summer (DST): UTC+4:30 (IRDT)

Tikmeh Dash (Persian: تيكمه داش, romanized: Tīkmeh Dāsh; also known as Tekmeh Dāsh) is a village in Nazarkahrizi Rural District, Nazarkahrizi District, Hashtrud County, East Azerbaijan Province, Iran. At the 2006 census, its population was 71, in 13 families.
