= Bakeshluchay Rural District =

Rural district in West Azerbaijan province, Iran

Bakeshluchay Rural District Persian: دهستان بکشلوچای
- Rural District
- Location within Iran
- Coordinates: 37°34′N 45°13′E
- Country: Iran
- Province: West Azerbaijan
- County: Urmia
- District: Central
- Established: 1987
- Capital: Emamzadeh

Population (2016)
  - Total: 34,683
- Time zone: UTC+3:30 (IRST)

Bakeshluchay Rural District (Persian: دهستان بکشلوچای) is in the Central District of Urmia County, West Azerbaijan province, Iran. Its capital is the village of Emamzadeh. The previous capital of the rural district was the village of Kashtiban.

== Demographics ==
=== Population ===
At the time of the 2006 National Census, the rural district's population was 22,672 in 6,208 households. There were 28,864 inhabitants in 7,466 households at the following census of 2011. The 2016 census measured the population of the rural district as 34,683 in 8,890 households. The most populous of its 60 villages was Reyhanabad, with 10,536 people.

=== Other villages in the rural district ===
- Aghcheh Qaleh
- Almanabad
- Balderlu
- Barajuq
- Kordlar
- Mashkabad-e Sofla
- Miavaq
- Sadaqeh
- Sangar-e Mir Abdollah
- Yuvalar
