= Qareh Poshtelu-e Bala Rural District =

Rural district in Zanjan province, Iran

Qareh Poshtelu-e Bala Rural District Persian: دهستان قره‌پشتلو بالا
- Rural District
- Location within Iran
- Coordinates: 37°01′N 48°22′E
- Country: Iran
- Province: Zanjan
- County: Zanjan
- District: Qareh Poshtelu
- Established: 1987
- Capital: Armaghankhaneh

Population (2016)
  - Total: 5,147
- Time zone: UTC+3:30 (IRST)

Qareh Poshtelu-e Bala Rural District (Persian: دهستان قره‌پشتلو بالا) is in Qareh Poshtelu District of Zanjan County, Zanjan province, Iran. It is administered from the city of Armaghankhaneh.

== Demographics ==
=== Population ===
At the time of the 2006 National Census, the rural district's population was 13,915 in 3,250 households. There were 11,917 inhabitants in 3,303 households at the following census of 2011. The 2016 census measured the population of the rural district as 5,147 in 1,534 households. The most populous of its 30 villages was Meshkin, with 1,264 people.

=== Other villages in the rural district ===
- Aq Kand
- Bagh
- Bahram Beyk
- Dash Tappeh
- Do Saran
- Eslamabad
- Golchin
- Golojeh
- Jalilabad
- Jureh Kandi
- Kalasar
- Kord Qeshlaq
- Mari
- Owch Bolagh
- Owrachi
- Pazuki
- Qarah Tappeh
- Qarluq
- Qashqa Tappeh
- Tekmeh Dash
- Zangi Kuh
- Zarrik
