= Charuymaq-e Jonubesharqi Rural District =

Rural district in East Azerbaijan province, Iran

Charuymaq-e Jonubesharqi Rural District Persian: دهستان چاراويماق جنوب شرقي
- Rural District
- Location within Iran
- Coordinates: 36°57′N 47°09′E
- Country: Iran
- Province: East Azerbaijan
- County: Charuymaq
- District: Shadian
- Established: 1987
- Capital: Zaker Kandi

Population (2016)
  - Total: 4,428
- Time zone: UTC+3:30 (IRST)

Charuymaq-e Jonubesharqi Rural District (Persian: دهستان چاراويماق جنوب شرقي) is in Shadian District of Charuymaq County, East Azerbaijan province, Iran. Its capital is the village of Zaker Kandi.

== Demographics ==
=== Population ===
At the time of the 2006 National Census, the rural district's population was 5,155 in 933 households. There were 4,961 inhabitants in 1,166 households at the following census of 2011. The 2016 census measured the population of the rural district as 4,428 in 1,275 households. The most populous of its 51 villages was Agh Bolagh-e Kuranlu, with 597 people.

=== Other villages in the rural district ===
- Beyglar Kandi
- Qarah Safar
- Qelech Khan Kandi
- Qermezi Bagh
