= Charuymaq-e Sharqi Rural District =

Rural district in East Azerbaijan province, Iran

Charuymaq-e Sharqi Rural District Persian: دهستان چاراويماق شرقي
- Rural District
- Location within Iran
- Coordinates: 37°04′N 47°23′E
- Country: Iran
- Province: East Azerbaijan
- County: Charuymaq
- District: Shadian
- Established: 1987
- Capital: Aghcheh Rish

Population (2016)
  - Total: 6,939
- Time zone: UTC+3:30 (IRST)

Charuymaq-e Sharqi Rural District (Persian: دهستان چاراويماق شرقي) is in Shadian District of Charuymaq County, East Azerbaijan province, Iran. Its capital is the village of Aghcheh Rish.

== Demographics ==
=== Population ===
At the time of the 2006 National Census, the rural district's population was 7,630 in 1,269 households. There were 7,443 inhabitants in 1,687 households at the following census of 2011. The 2016 census measured the population of the rural district as 6,939 in 1,939 households. The most populous of its 52 villages was Owrtasu, with 1,201 people.

=== Other villages in the rural district ===
- Amuowghli-ye Sofla
- Davah Yataqi
- Qaleh-ye Hoseynabad
