= Shadian District =

District in East Azerbaijan province, Iran

Shadian District Persian: بخش شادیان
- District
- Location within Iran
- Coordinates: 37°01′N 47°20′E
- Country: Iran
- Province: East Azerbaijan
- County: Charuymaq
- Established: 2000
- Capital: Aghcheh Rish

Population (2016)
  - Total: 11,367
- Time zone: UTC+3:30 (IRST)

Shadian District (Persian: بخش شادیان) is in Charuymaq County, East Azerbaijan province, Iran. Its capital is the village of Aghcheh Rish.

== Demographics ==
=== Population ===
At the time of the 2006 National Census, the district's population was 12,785 in 2,202 households. The following census in 2011 counted 12,404 people in 2,853 households. The 2016 census measured the population of the district as 11,367 inhabitants, 3,214 households.

=== Administrative divisions ===
Shadian District Population
Administrative Divisions	2006	2011	2016
Charuymaq-e Jonubesharqi RD	5,155	4,961	4,428
Charuymaq-e Sharqi RD	7,630	7,443	6,939
Total	12,785	12,404	11,367
RD = Rural District
