= Qareh Poshtelu District =

District in Zanjan province, Iran

Qareh Poshtelu District Persian: بخش قره‌پشتلو
- District
- Location within Iran
- Coordinates: 37°00′N 48°20′E
- Country: Iran
- Province: Zanjan
- County: Zanjan
- Established: 2003
- Capital: Armaghankhaneh

Population (2016)
  - Total: 15,969
- Time zone: UTC+3:30 (IRST)

Qareh Poshtelu District (Persian: بخش قره‌پشتلو) is in Zanjan County, Zanjan province, Iran. Its capital is the city of Armaghankhaneh.

== History ==
The village of Armaghankhaneh was elevated to the status of a city in 2008. Soharin Rural District was created in the district in 2013.

== Demographics ==
=== Population ===
At the time of the 2006 census, the district's population was 17,153 in 3,934 households. The following census in 2011 counted 16,516 people in 4,421 households. The 2016 census measured the population of the district as 15,969 inhabitants in 4,788 households.

=== Administrative divisions ===
Qareh Poshtelu District Population
Administrative Divisions	2006	2011	2016
Qareh Poshtelu-e Bala RD	13,915	11,917	5,147
Qareh Poshtelu-e Pain RD	3,238	2,654	2,324
Soharin RD			6,349
Armaghankhaneh (city)		1,945	2,149
Total	17,153	16,516	15,969
RD = Rural District
