= Takht =

Takht may refer to:

== Places ==
=== Iran ===
- Takht-e Olya, a village in East Azerbaijan Province, Iran
- Takht-e Sofla, a village in East Azerbaijan Province, Iran
- Takht, Golestan, a village in Mindasht County, Golestan Province, Iran
- Takht, Hamadan, a village in Razan County, Hamadan Province, Iran
- Takht, Hormozgan, a village in Bandar Abbas County, Hormozgan Province, Iran
- Takht-e Goru, a village in Bastak County, Hormozgan Province, Iran
- Takht, Kurdistan, a village in Saqqez County, Kurdistan Province, Iran
- Takht, North Khorasan, a village in Shrivan County, North Khorasan Province, Iran
- Takht District, an administrative subdivision of Hormozgan Province, Iran
- Takht Rural District, an administrative subdivision of Hormozgan Province, Iran
- Takht-e Qeysar, a village in Khuzestan Province, Iran
- Takht-e Tuk, a village in Khuzestan Province, Iran
- Takht-e Soleymān, an archaeologically notable remains of an ancient temple and citadel in northwestern Iran

=== Pakistan ===
- Takht-i-Bahi, an archaeological site in Mardan
- Takht-e-Sulaiman – a mountain peak in Pakistan

== Other uses ==
- Takht (Sikhism), the temporal seat of power or throne of authority in Sikhism
- Takht (music), the representative small musical ensemble or orchestra of Arab music
- Takht., taxonomic author abbreviation used for the Soviet-Armenian botanist Armen Takhtajan when citing a botanical name
- Takht (film), an upcoming Indian Hindi-language period drama film
- Takht, historic Arabic term for sand tables, used for calculations

== See also ==
- Taht (disambiguation)
- Takhta (rural locality), Russia
