= Abdul Slili =

Moroccan writer

- Occupations: poet and writer

Abdul Slili (Arabic: عبد الرحيم سليلي) is a Moroccan poet and writer, and a member of the Moroccan Writers Union.

== His professional career ==
Abdul Slili is a member of the Moroccan Writers Union, editor-in-chief of the quarterly magazine “Qawafel Sijilmassa” for culture, education and creativity, and a researcher in the new poetic experience in the Arab world. He is also a consultant in one of the branches of the Rashidieh Moroccan Writers, Union and a high school principal. He is one of the 50 poets who contributed to the Diwan of the poems of Mufdi Zakaria poetry in the Maghreb issued as part of the activities of Algeria, the capital of Arab culture in 2007.

== His works ==
=== Short stories ===
- On burning sand.
- The wall.
- Clashes on the edge of an old wound.
- He was dancing oriental samba.
- In addition to a group of poems, studies and stories published in most Moroccan supplements and some specialized newspapers and magazines in the Arab world, such as the Cairo Poetry Magazine, several poems, Contemporary Writings magazine, Al-Shahid magazine, the Saudi cultural magazine, the Saudi Arabian magazine, the creative magazine in Dubai, the Kuwait magazine, the magazine Jordan Ideas, Al Jasra Magazine Qatar, and Al Waha Educational Magazine.

=== Poetical compositions ===
- Galaxy of Reveals: First Edition 2002 Second Edition Coming Soon.
- Angels in the Nebula: published in 2010, and publications of the Moroccan Writers Union, second edition in 2018.
- Showers: Released 2011.
- Clashes on the edge of an old wound.

=== Poems ===
- The sky is about to fall.

== Awards ==
- Al-Tayeb Salih Prize for the field of story, the ninth session, 2018–2019.
- Tangier Poetry Prize for Arabic Poetry, Federico Garcia Lorca, 2000.
- Mufdi Zakaria Prize for Maghreb poetry in Algeria in 2001.
- Innovators Award in Dubai city in 2004.
- Mention of the Moroccan Writers Union Award, two sessions, 1994–2001.
- In addition to many other national awards.
