= Tahat =

Tahat may refer to:

- Mount Tahat, a mountain in Algeria
- Tahart, a village in Algeria

== See also ==
- Taht (disambiguation)
