= Arab culture =

Culture of the Arab people

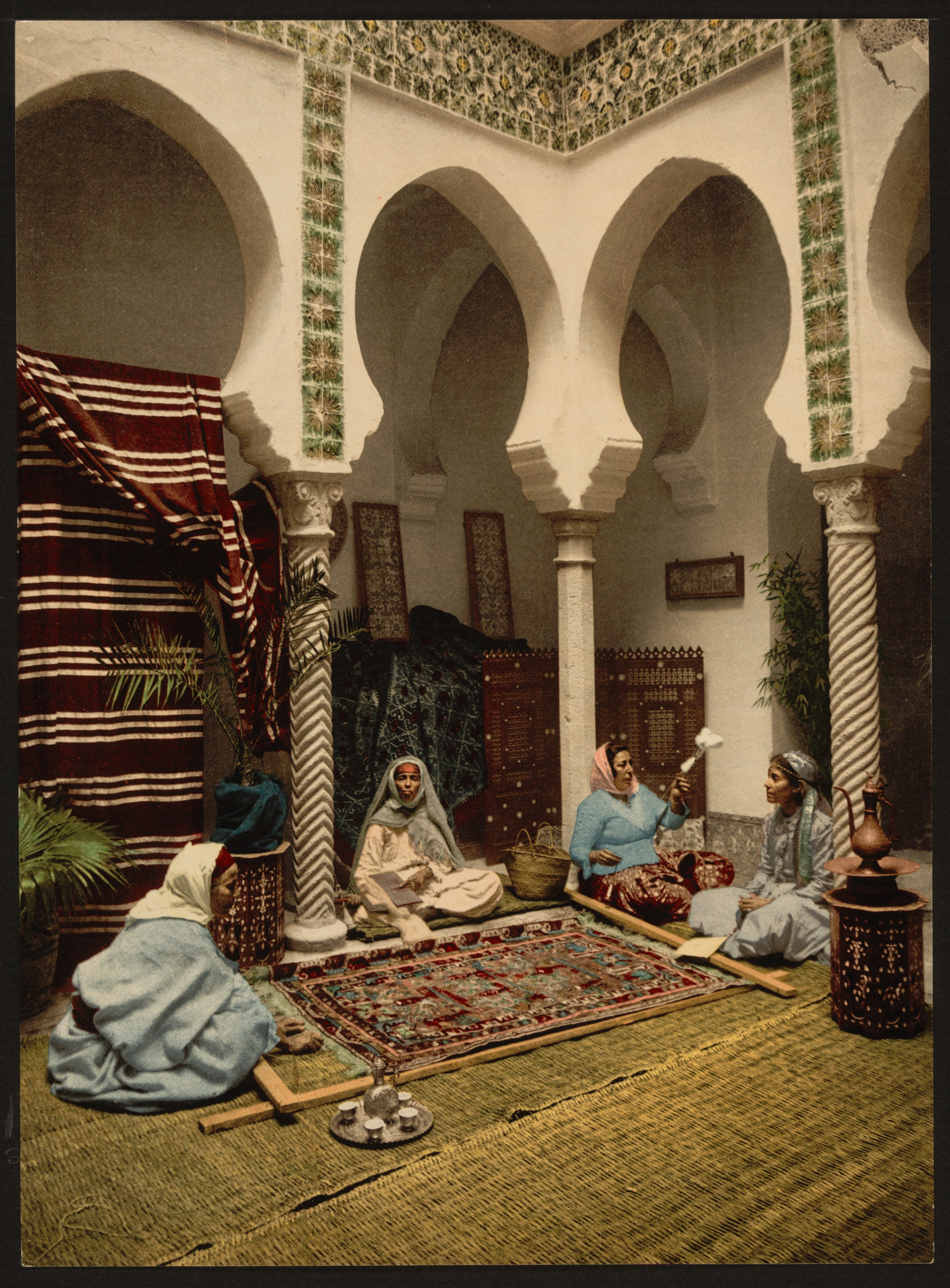
Making Arab carpets in Algiers, 1899

Arab culture is the culture of the Arabs, from the Atlantic Ocean in the west to the Arabian Sea in the east, in a region of the Middle East and North Africa known as the Arab world. The various religions the Arabs have adopted throughout their history and the various empires and kingdoms that have ruled and took lead of the civilization have contributed to the ethnogenesis and formation of modern Arab culture. Language, literature, gastronomy, art, architecture, music, spirituality, philosophy, and mysticism are all part of the cultural heritage of the Arabs.

The countries of the Arab world share a common culture, traditions, language and history that give the region a distinct identity and distinguish it from other parts of the Muslim world.

== Literature ==
Arabic literature is the writing produced, both prose and poetry, by speakers of the Arabic language. The Arabic word used for literature is adab which is derived from a word meaning "to invite someone for a meal" and implies politeness, culture and enrichment. Arabic literature emerged in the 6th century, with only fragments of the written language appearing before then. The Qur'an, from the 7th century, had a long-lasting effect on Arabic culture and literature.

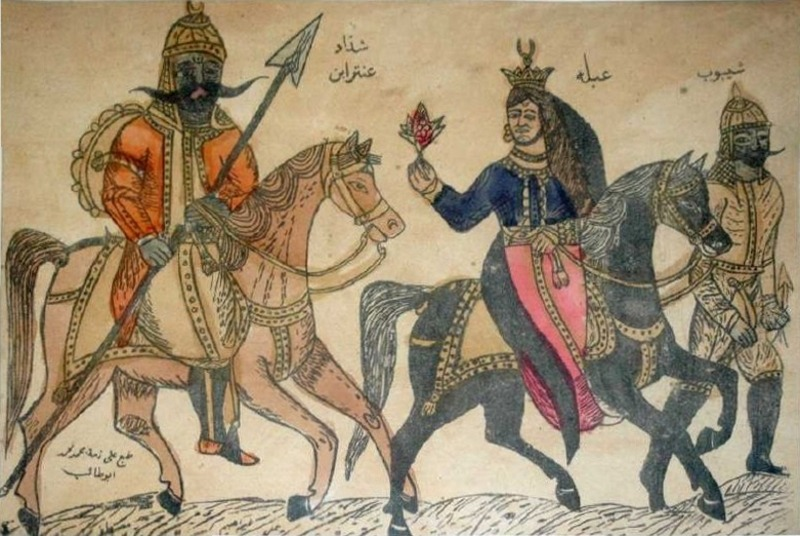
Antara and Abla

The Mu'allaqat (Arabic: المعلقات, [al-muʕallaqaːt]) is the name given to a series of seven Arabic poems or qasida that originated before the time of Islam. Each poem in the set has a different author, and is considered to be their best work. Mu'allaqat means "The Suspended Odes" or "The Hanging Poems," and comes from the poems being hung on the wall in the Kaaba at Mecca.

The seven authors, who span a period of around 100 years, are Imru' al-Qais, Tarafa, Zuhayr, Labīd, 'Antara Ibn Shaddad, 'Amr ibn Kulthum, and Harith ibn Hilliza. All of the Mu’allaqats contain stories from the authors’ lives and tribe politics. This is because poetry was used in pre-Islamic time to advertise the strength of a tribe's king, wealth and people.

The One Thousand and One Nights (Arabic: أَلْف لَيْلَة وَلَيْلَة ʾAlf layla wa-layla), is a medieval folk tale collection which tells the story of Scheherazade, a Sassanid queen who must relate a series of stories to her malevolent husband, King Shahryar (Šahryār), to delay her execution. The stories are told over a period of one thousand and one nights, and every night she ends the story with a suspenseful situation, forcing the King to keep her alive for another day. The individual stories were created over several centuries, by many people from a number of different lands.

During the reign of the Abbasid Caliph Harun al-Rashid in the 8th century, Baghdad had become an important cosmopolitan city. Merchants from Persia, China, India, Africa, and Europe were all found in Baghdad. During this time, many of the folk stories are thought to have been collected orally and later compiled into a single book. The compiler and ninth-century translator into Arabic is reputedly the storyteller Abu Abd-Allah Muhammad el-Gahshigar. The frame story of Shahrzad seems to have been added in the 14th century.

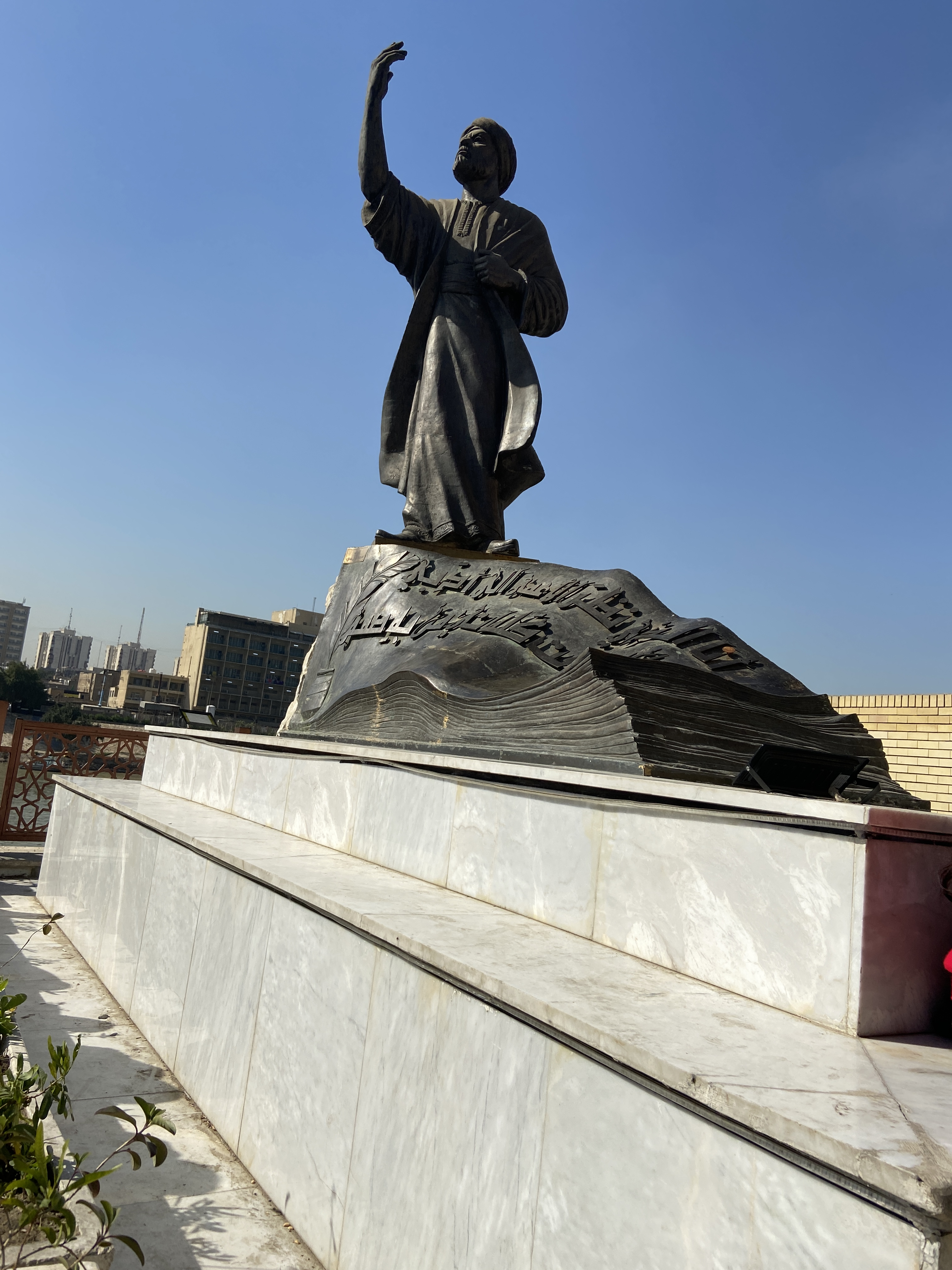
A statue of the Abbasid-era Arab poet Al-Mutanabbi

An example of modern poetry in classical Arabic style with themes of Pan-Arabism is the work of Aziz Pasha Abaza. He came from Abaza family which produced notable Arabic literary figures including Ismail Pasha Abaza, Fekry Pasha Abaza, novelist Tharwat Abaza, and Desouky Bek Abaza, among others.

== Music ==
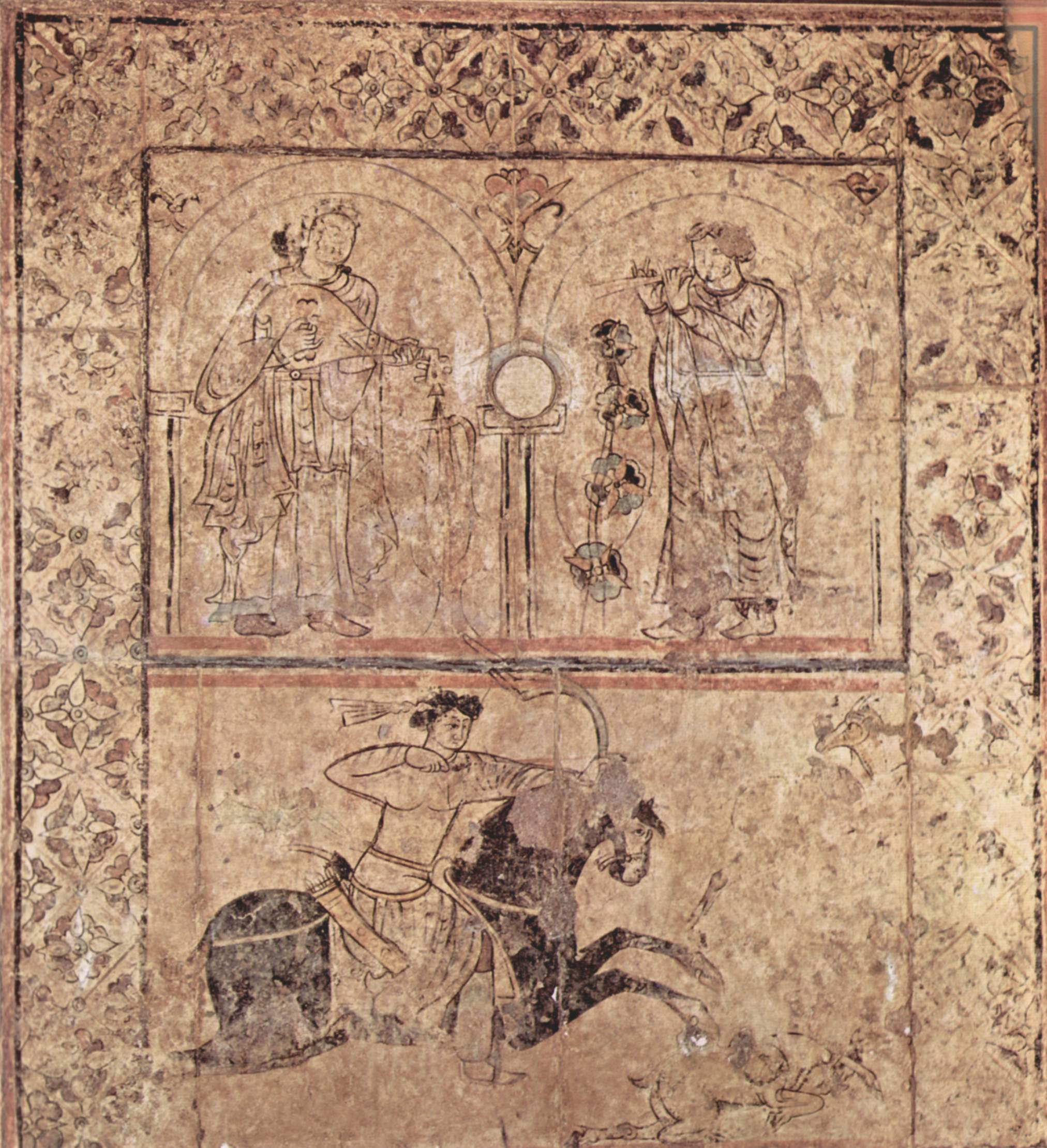
Fresco from Qasr al-Hayr al-Gharbî, Syria, Umayyad caliph's Palace, built in the early 7th century

Arabic music is the music of Arabs, especially those centered around the Arabian Peninsula. The world of Arab music has long been dominated by Cairo, a cultural center, though musical innovation and regional styles abound from Tunisia to Saudi Arabia. Beirut has, in recent years, also become a major center of Arabic music. Classical Arab music is extremely popular across the population, especially a small number of superstars known throughout the Arab world. Regional styles of popular music include Iraqi el Maqaam, Algerian raï, Kuwaiti sawt and Egyptian el gil.

"The common style that developed is usually called 'Islamic' or 'Arab', though in fact it transcends religious, ethnic, geographical, and linguistic boundaries" and it is suggested that it be called the Near East (from Morocco to Afghanistan) style.

Habib Hassan Touma lists "five components" which "characterize the music of the Arabs: The Arab tone system (a musical tuning system) with specific interval structures, invented by al-Farabi in the 10th century (p. 170). a) Rhythmic-temporal structures that produce a rich variety of rhythmic patterns, awzan, used to accompany the metered vocal and instrumental genres and give them form. b) Musical instruments that are found throughout the Arabian world and that represent a standardized tone system, are played with standardized performance techniques, and exhibit similar details in construction and design. c) Specific social contexts for the making of music, whereby musical genres can be classified as urban (music of the city inhabitants), rural (music of the country inhabitants), or Bedouin (music of the desert inhabitants). d) A musical mentality that is responsible for the aesthetic homogeneity of the tonal-spatial and rhythmic-temporal structures in Arabian music, whether composed or improvised, instrumental or vocal, secular or sacred.

The Arab musical mentality is defined by the maqām phenomenon; the predominance of vocal music, the predilection for small instrumental ensembles, the mosaiclike stringing together of musical form elements, that is, the arrangement in a sequence of small and smallest melodic elements, and their repetition, combination, and permutation within the framework of the tonal-spatial model; the absence of polyphony, polyrhythm, and motivic development. Arabian music is, however, very familiar with the ostinato, as well as with a more instinctive heterophonic way of making music; the alternation between a free rhythmic-temporal and fixed tonal-spatial organization on the one hand and a fixed rhythmic-temporal and free tonal-spatial structure on the other. This alternation... results in exciting contrasts."

Arab music is characterized by an emphasis on melody and rhythm rather than harmony, which makes it homophonic in nature. Some genres are polyphonic (as the instrument Kanoun is based upon the idea of playing two-note chords) but quintessentially, Arabic music is melodic. The basis of Arabic music is the maqam (pl. maqamat). The maqam has a "tonal" note on which the piece must end (unless modulation occurs).

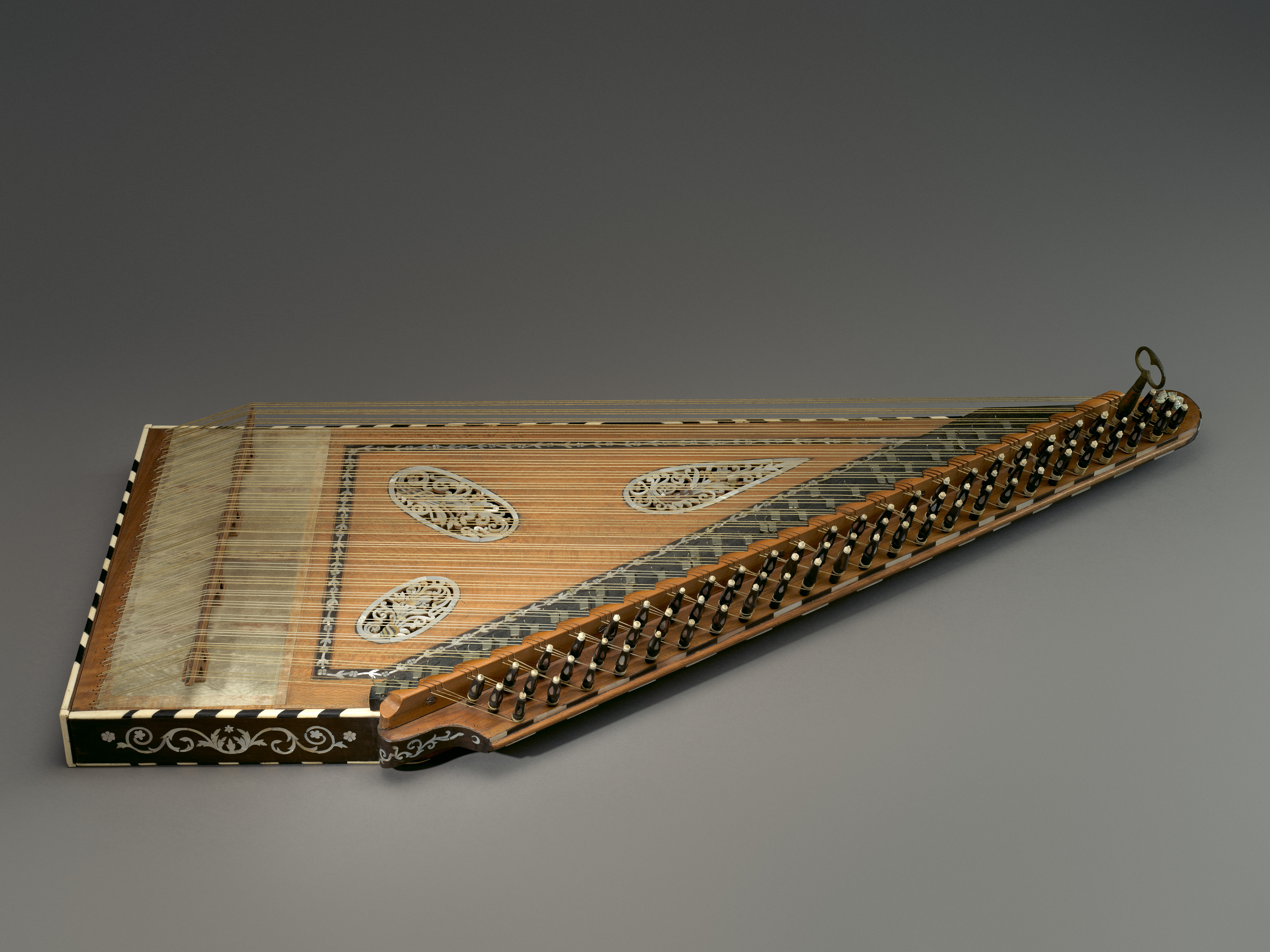
The qanun is widely used in Arabic music

The maqam consists of at least two jins, or scale segments. "Jins" in Arabic comes from the ancient Greek word "genus," meaning type. In practice, a jins (pl. ajnas) is either a trichord, a tetrachord, or a pentachord. The trichord is three notes, the tetrachord four, and the pentachord five. The maqam usually covers only one octave (two jins), but sometimes more. Like the melodic minor scale and Indian ragas, some maqamat have different ajnas, and thus notes, while descending or ascending. In practice most musicians agree on the 8 most frequently used ajnas: Rast, Bayat, Sikah, Hijaz, Saba, Kurd, Nahawand, and Ajam — and a few of the most commonly used variants: Nakriz, Athar Kurd, Sikah Beladi, Saba Zamzama. Mukhalif is a rare jins used exclusively in Iraq and does not occur in combination with other ajnas.

The main difference between the western chromatic scale and the Arabic scales is the existence of many in-between notes, which are sometimes referred to as quarter tones for the sake of practicality. However, while in some treatments of theory the quarter tone scale or all twenty four tones should exist, according to Yūsuf Shawqī (1969) in practice there are many fewer tones. In 1932, at International Convention on Arabic music held in Cairo, Egypt (attended by such Western luminaries as Béla Bartók and Henry George Farmer), experiments were done which determined conclusively that the notes in actual use differ substantially from an even-tempered 24-tone scale, and furthermore that the intonation of many of those notes differ slightly from region to region (Egypt, Turkey, Syria, Iraq). The commission's recommendation is as follows: "The tempered scale and the natural scale should be rejected. In Egypt, the Egyptian scale is to be kept with the values, which were measured with all possible precision. The Turkish, Syrian, and Iraqi scales should remain what they are...". Both in modern practice, and based on the evidence from recorded music over the course of the last century, there are several differently tuned "E"s in between the E♭ and E♮ of the Western Chromatic scale, depending on the maqam or jins in use, and depending on the region.

Musicians refer to these in-between notes as "quarter-tones" ("half-flat" or "half-sharp") for ease of nomenclature, but perform and teach the exact values of intonation in each jins or maqam by ear. It should also be added, in reference to Touma's comment above, that these "quarter-tones" are not used everywhere in the maqamat: in practice, Arabic music does not modulate to 12 different tonic areas like the Well-Tempered Klavier, and so the most commonly used "quarter tones" are on E (between E♭ and E♮), A, B, D, F (between F♮ and F♯) and C.

The prototypical Arab ensemble in Egypt and Syria is known as the takht, which includes, (or included at different time periods) instruments such as the 'oud, qanún, rabab, nay, violin (which was introduced in the 1840s or 50s), riq and dumbek. In Iraq, the traditional ensemble, known as the chalghi, includes only two melodic instruments—the jowza (similar to the rabab but with four strings) and santur—with riq and dumbek.

== Dance ==
Arab dance, also referred to as Oriental dance, Middle-Eastern dance and Eastern dance, refers to the traditional folk dances in Arab world (Middle East and North Africa). The term "Arabic dance" is often associated with the belly dance. However, there are many styles of traditional Arab dance, and many of them have a long history. These may be folk dances, or dances that were once performed as rituals or as entertainment spectacle, and some may have been performed in the imperial court. Coalescence of oral storytelling, poetry recital, and performative music and dance as long-standing traditions in Arab history. Among the best-known of the Arab traditional dances are the belly dance and the Dabke.

Belly dance, also referred to as Eastern dance (Arabic: رقص شرقي, romanized: Raqs sharqi), is an Arab expressive dance, which emphasizes complex movements of the torso. Many boys and girls in countries where belly dancing is popular will learn how to do it when they are young. The dance involves movement of many different parts of the body; usually in a circular way.

== Family honor ==
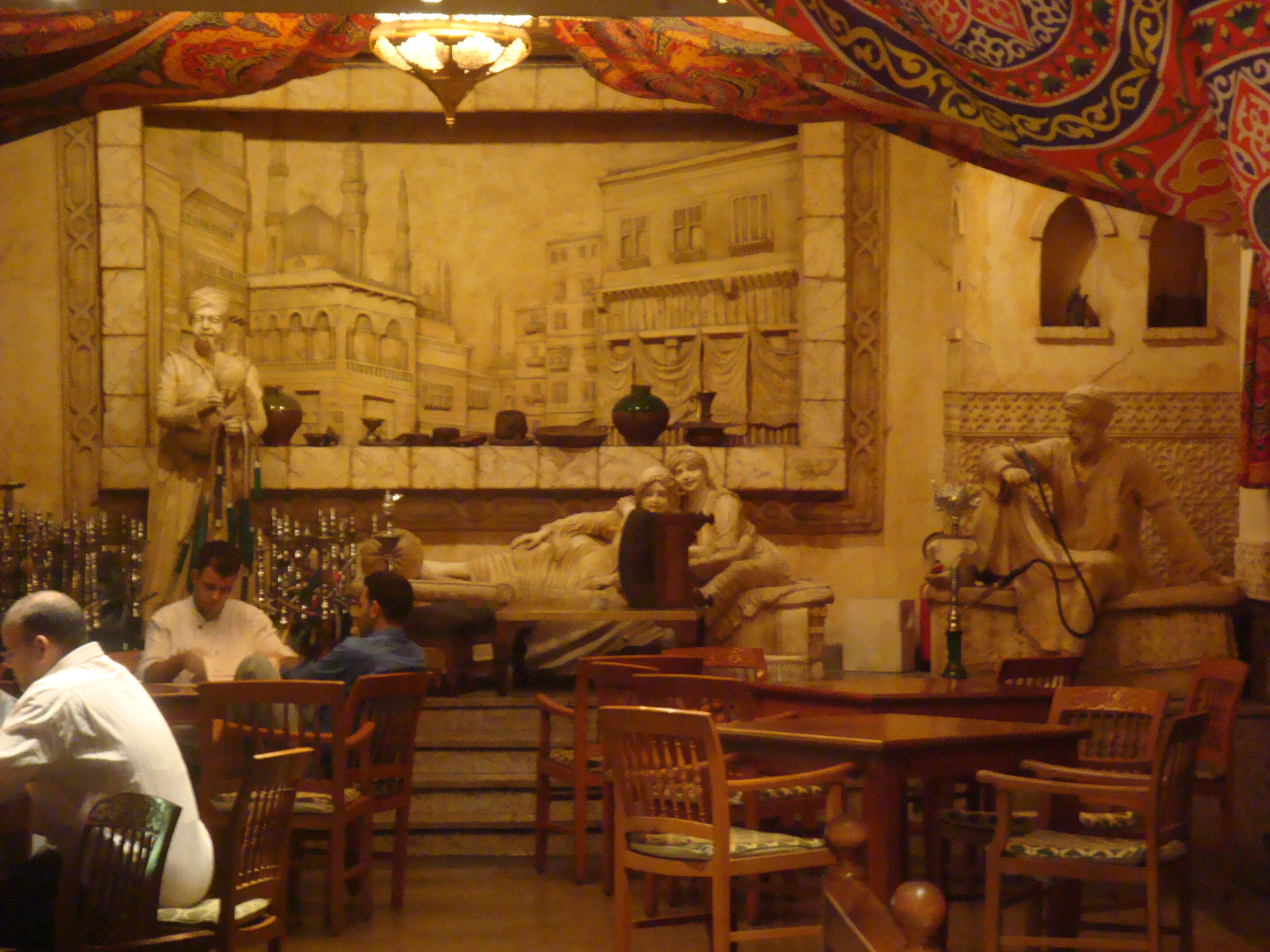
A café in Cairo

Family is one of the most important aspects of the Arab society. While self-reliance, individuality, and responsibility are taught by Arabic parents to their children, family loyalty is the greatest lesson taught in Arab families. "Unlike the extreme individualism we see in North America (every person for him or herself, individual rights, families living on their own away from relatives, and so on), Arab society emphasizes the importance of the group. Arab culture teaches that the needs of the group are more important than the needs of one person." In the Bedouin tribes of Saudi Arabia, "intense feelings of loyalty and dependence are fostered and preserved" by the family. Margaret Nydell, in her book Understanding Arabs: A Guide for Modern Times, writes "family loyalty and obligations take precedence over loyalty to friends or demands of a job." She goes on to state that "members of a family are expected to support each other in disputes with outsiders. Regardless of personal antipathy among relatives, they must defend each other's honor, counter criticism, and display group cohesion..." Of all members of the family, however, the most revered member is the mother.

According to Margaret Nydell, social exchanges between men and women happen very seldom outside of the work place. Men and women refrain from being alone together. They have to be very careful in social situations because those interactions can be interpreted negatively and cause gossip, which can tarnish the reputation of women. Women are able to socialize freely with other women and male family members, but have to have family members present to socialize with men that are not part of the family. These conservative practices are put into place to protect the reputation of women. Bad behavior not only affects women but her family's honor. Practices differ between countries and families. Saudi Arabia has stricter practices when it comes to men and women and will even require marriage documents if a woman and man are seen together alone.

Some of the most important values for Arabs are honor and loyalty. Margaret Nydell, in her book Understanding Arabs: A Guide for Modern Times says that Arabs can be defined as, humanitarian, loyal and polite. Tarek Mahfouz explains in the book Arab Culture that it is common for Arabs in dinner situations to insist on guests to eat the last piece of food or to fight over who will pay the bill at a restaurant.

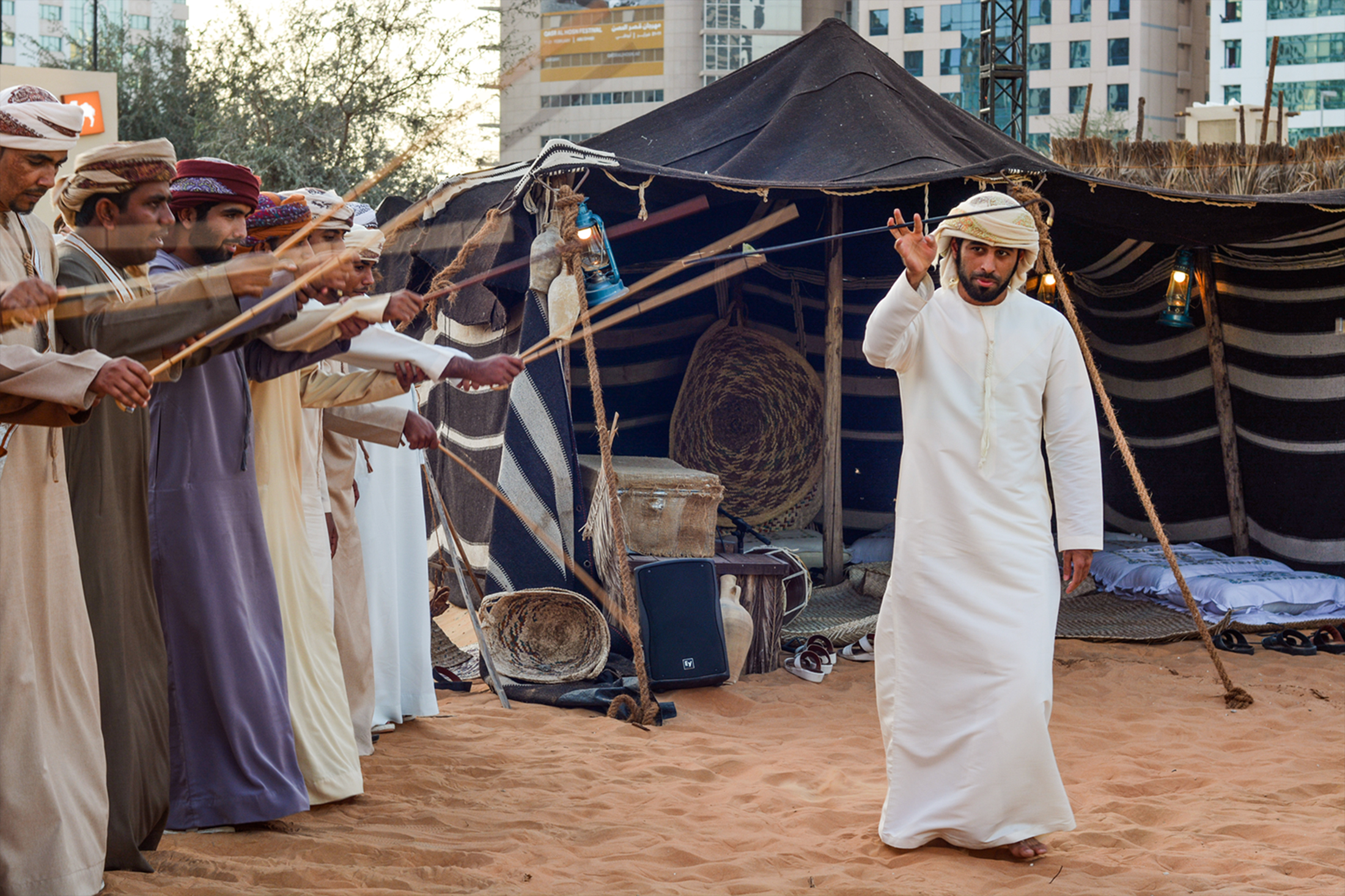
The Emirati kandura comes in different styles in winter.

The Arabian Peninsula is considered one of the oldest Arab cultural centers, historically linked to the desert and semi-desert environment, and the resulting tribal structures and social values based on kinship, hospitality, and tribal loyalty. This region includes the Gulf states and Yemen, where internal differences exist between coastal societies with their commercial and maritime character, and the Bedouin or agricultural societies in the interior. The discovery of oil in the 20th century contributed to profound transformations in the social and economic structure, while local traditions continue to be present in cultural and linguistic practices.

== Media in Arab culture ==
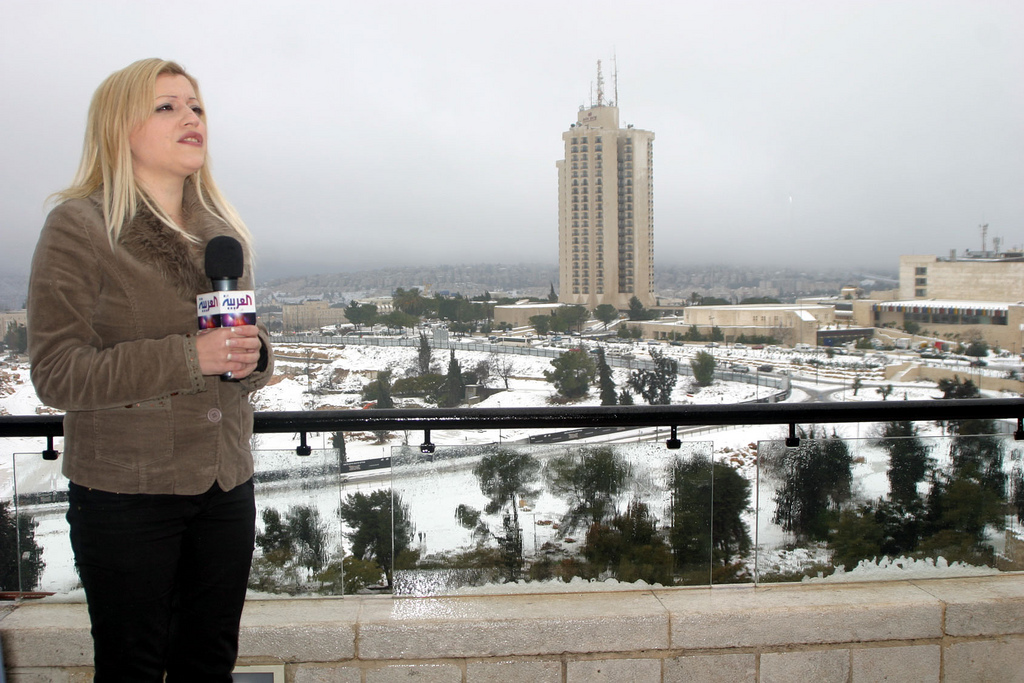
An anchor on Al-Arabiya Television, in Jerusalem

Arabic poetry once described the achievements of tribes and defeats of enemies and served as a tool for propaganda. Imams played a role in disseminating information and relaying news from the authorities to the people. The suq or marketplace gossip and interpersonal relationships played an important role in spreading news. Colonial powers and Christian Missionaries in Lebanon introduced the printing press but the first newspapers began to appear in the 19th century, mainly in Egypt and Lebanon, which had the most newspapers per capita.

During French rule in Egypt in the time of Napoleon Bonaparte, the first newspaper was published, in French. There is debate over when the first Arabic language newspaper was published; according to Arab scholar Abu Bakr, it was Al Tanbeeh (1800), published in Egypt, or it was Junral Al Iraq (1816), published in Iraq, according to other researchers. In the mid-19th century, the Ottoman Empire dominated the first newspapers.

The first newspapers were limited to official content and included accounts of relations with other countries and civil trials. In the following decades Arab media blossomed due to journalists mainly from Syria and Lebanon, who were intellectuals and published their newspapers without the intention of making a profit. Because of government restrictions these intellectuals were forced to flee their respective countries but had gained a following.

The first émigré Arab newspaper, Mar’at al Ahwal, was published in Turkey in 1855 by Rizqallah Hassoun Al Halabi. It was criticized by the Ottoman Empire and shut down after only one year. Intellectuals in the Arab world soon realized the power of the press. Some countries' newspapers were government-run and had political agendas in mind. Independent newspapers began to spring up which expressed opinions and were a place for the public to out their views on the state. Illiteracy rates in the Arab world played a role in the formation of media, and due to the low reader rates newspapers were forced to get political parties to subsidize their publications, giving them input to editorial policy.

The introduction of the Internet in Middle East has promoted political, cultural, and social change. The internet has brought economic prosperity and development, but bloggers have been incarcerated for their opinions and views on their regimes. On the other hand, the internet has provided a public shield for bloggers since they have the ability to engage public sympathy on a large scale.

Each country or region in the Arab world has colloquial dialects used for everyday speech, yet their presence in the media world is discouraged. Prior to the establishment of Modern Standard Arabic (MSA), during the 19th century, the language of the media was stylized and resembled literary language of the time, proving to be ineffective in relaying information. Currently MSA is used by Arab media, including newspapers, books and some television stations, in addition to all formal writing. Vernaculars are however present in certain forms of media including satires, dramas, music videos and other local programs.

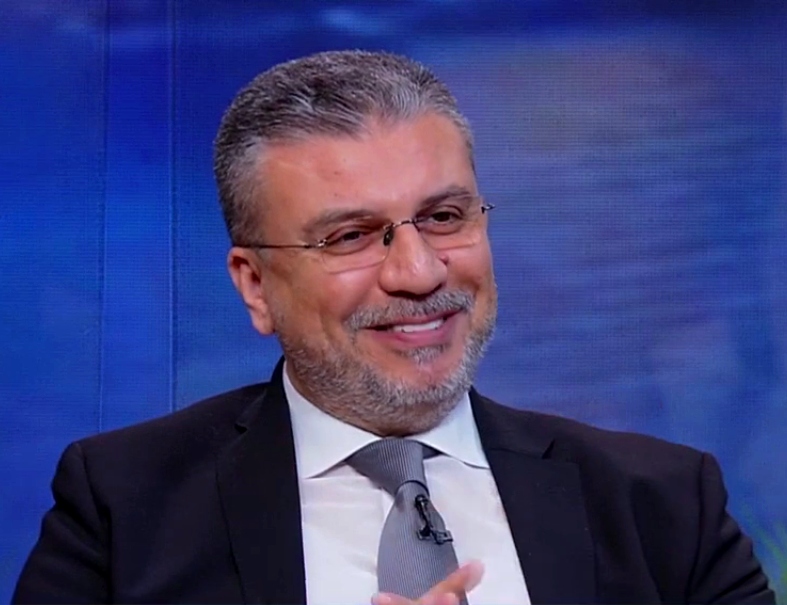
Amr el-Leithy, television and radio presenter

Journalism ethics is a system of values that determines what constitutes "good" and "bad" journalism. A system of media values consists of and is constructed by journalists' and other actors' decisions about issues like what is "newsworthy," how to frame the news, and whether to observe topical "red lines." Such a system of values varies over space and time, and is embedded within the existing social, political, and economic structures in a society. William Rugh states, "There is an intimate, organic relationship between media institutions and society in the way that those institutions are organized and controlled. Neither the institution nor the society in which it functions can be understood properly without reference to the other. This is certainly true in the Arab world." Media values in the Arab world therefore vary between and within countries. In the words of Lawrence Pintak and Jeremy Ginges (2008), “The Arab media are not a monolith.”

Kuldip Roy Rampal's study of journalist training programs in North Africa led him to the conclusion that "the most compelling dilemma faced by professional journalists, increasingly graduates of journalism degree programs, in the four Maghreb states is how to reconcile their preference for press freedom and objectivity with constraints imposed by political and legal factors that point to a pro-government journalism." Iyotika Ramaprasad and Naila Nabil Hamdy state, “A new trend toward objectivity and impartiality as a value in Arab journalism seems to be emerging, and the values of Arab and Western journalism in this field have started to converge.” Further, many journalists in the Arab world express their desires for the media to become a fourth estate akin to the media in the West. In a survey of 601 journalists in the Arab world, 40% of them viewed investigation of the government as part of their job.

Some Arab journalists see no conflict between objectivity and support for political causes. Ramprasad and Hamdy's sample of 112 Egyptian journalists gave the highest importance to supporting Arabism and Arab values, which included injunctions such as “defend Islamic societies, traditions and values” and “support the cause of the Palestinians.” Sustaining democracy through “examining government policies and decisions critically,” ranked a close second.

Other journalists reject the notion of media ethics because they see it as a mechanism of control. Kai Hafez states, “Many governments in the Arab world have tried to hijack the issue of media ethics and have used it as yet another controlling device, with the result that many Arab journalists, while they love to speak about the challenges of their profession, hate performing under the label of media ethics.”

Historically, news in the Arab world was used to inform, guide, and publicize the actions of political practitioners. The power of news as political tool became evident in the early 19th century, with the purchase of shares from Le Temps a French newspaper by Ismail the grandson of Muhammad Ali. Doing so allowed Ismail to publicize his policies. Arab Media coming to modernity flourished and with it its responsibilities to the political figures that have governed its role. Ami Ayalon argues in his history of the press in the Arab Middle East that, “Private journalism began as an enterprise with very modest objectives, seeking not to defy authority but rather to serve it, to collaborate and coexist cordially with it. The demand for freedom of expression, as well as for individual political freedom, a true challenge to the existing order, came only later, and hesitantly at that, and was met by a public response that can best be described as faint."

Media researchers stress that the moral and social responsibility of newspeople dictates that they should not agitate public opinion, but rather keep the status quo. It is also important to preserve national unity by not stirring up ethnic or religious conflict.

The value of media in the Arab world has changed with the emergence of “new media," such as news websites, blogs, and satellite television stations like Al Arabiya. The founding of the Qatari Al Jazeera network in 1996 blurred the line between private- and state- run news. Mohamed Zayani and Sofiane Sabraoui state, “Al Jazeera is owned by the government, but has an independent editorial policy; it is publicly funded, but independent minded.” The Al Jazeera media network espouses a clear mission and strategy, and was one of the first news organizations in the Arab world to release a code of ethics. Despite its government ties, it seeks to “give no priority to commercial or political over professional consideration” and to “cooperate with Arab and international journalistic unions and associations to defend freedom of the press.” With a motto of “the view and the other view,” it purports to “present the diverse points of view and opinions without bias and partiality.” It has sought to fuse these ostensibly Western media norms with a wider “Arab orientation,” evocative of the social responsibility discussed by scholars such as Noha Mellor above.

Recent assessments of Al Jazeera have criticized it for a lack of credibility in the wake of the Arab Spring. Criticism has come from within the Arab Middle East, including from state governments. Independent commentators have criticized its neutrality vis-a-vis the Syrian Civil War.

Media values are not the only variable that affects news output in Arab society. Hafez states, “The interaction of political, economic, and social environments with individual and collective professional ethics is the driving force behind journalism.” In most Arab countries, newspapers cannot be published without a government-issued license. Most Arab countries also have press laws, which impose boundaries on what can and cannot be said in print.

Censorship plays a significant role in journalism in the Arab world. Censorship comes in a variety of forms: Self-censorship, Government Censorship (governments struggle to control through technological advances in ex. the internet), Ideology/Religious Censorship, and Tribal/Family/Alliances Censorship. Because Journalism in the Arab world comes with a range of dangers – journalists throughout the Arab world can be imprisoned, tortured, and even killed in their line of work – self-censorship is extremely important for many Arab journalists. A study conducted by the Center for Defending Freedom of Journalists (CDFJ) in Jordan, for example, found that the majority of Jordanian journalists exercise self-censorship. CPJ found that 34 journalists were killed in the region in 2012, 72 were imprisoned on December 1, 2012, and 126 were in exile from 2007 to 2012.

Newspapers in the Arab world can be divided into three categories: government owned, partisan owned, and independently owned. Newspaper, radio, and television patronization in the Arab world has heretofore been primarily a function of governments. "Now, newspaper ownership has been consolidated in the hands of powerful chains and groups. Yet, profit is not the driving force behind the launching of newspapers; publishers may establish a newspaper to ensure a platform for their political opinions, although it is claimed that this doesn't necessarily influence the news content". In the Arab world, as far as content is concerned, news is politics. Arab states are intimately involved in the economic well-being of many Arab news organizations so they apply pressure in several ways, most notably through ownership or advertising.

Some analysts hold that cultural and societal pressures determine journalists' news output in the Arab world. For example, to the extent that family reputation and personal reputation are fundamental principles in Arabian civilization, exposes of corruption, examples of weak moral fiber in governors and policy makers, and investigative journalism may have massive consequences. In fact, some journalists and media trainers in the Arab world nevertheless actively promote the centrality of investigative journalism to the media's larger watchdog function. In Jordan, for example, where the degree of government and security service interference in the media is high, non-governmental organizations such as the Center for Defending the Freedom of Journalists (CDFJ) and Arab Reporters for Investigative Journalism (ARIJ) train journalists to undertake investigative journalism projects.

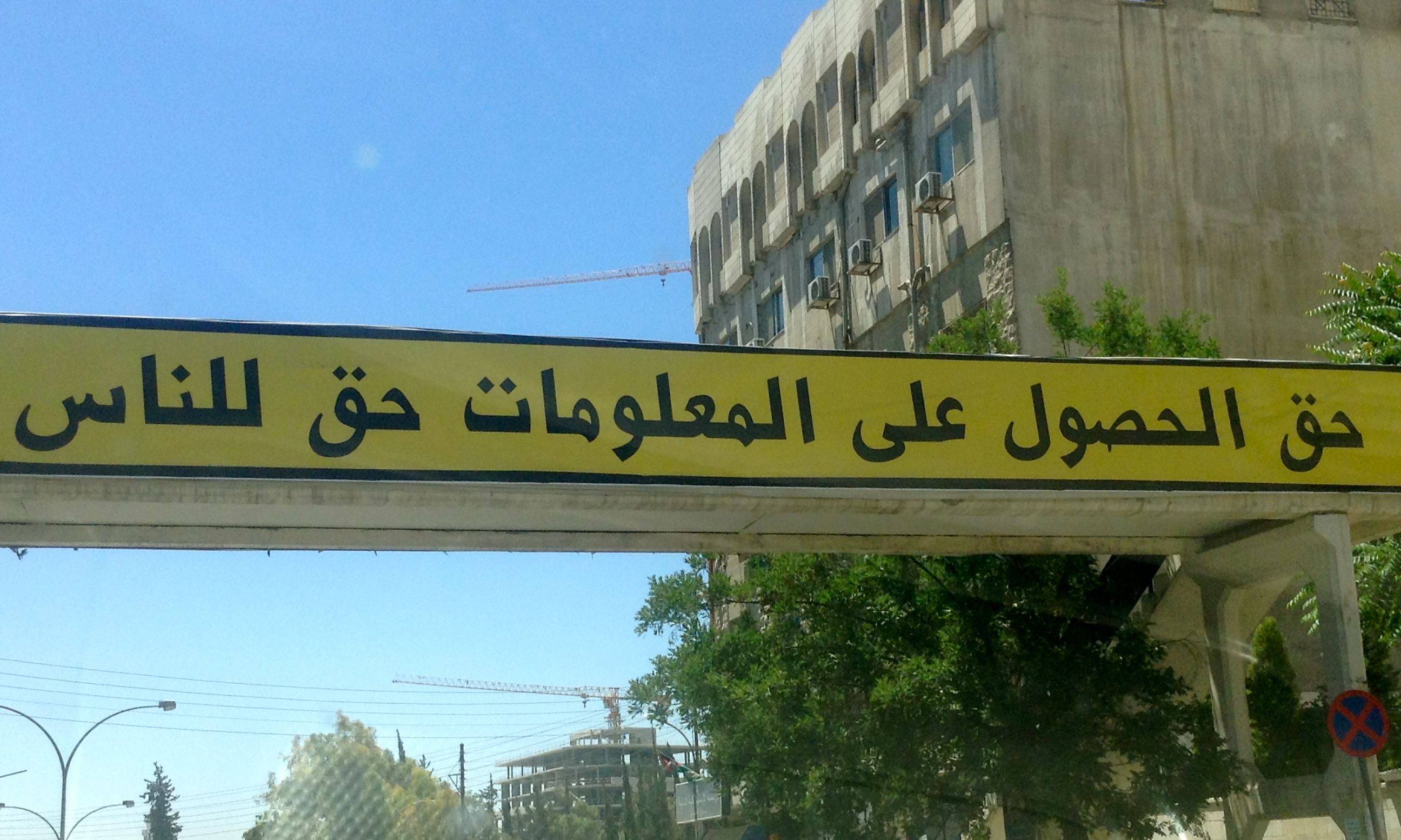
The Jordanian Center for Defending Freedom of Journalists (CDFJ) posted this sign in protest of the country's 2012 Press and Publications law. It reads, "The right to obtain information is a right for all people".

Some Saudi journalists stress the importance of enhancing Islam through the media. The developmental role of media was acknowledged by an overwhelming majority of Saudi journalists, while giving the readers what they want was not regarded as a priority. However, journalism codes, as an important source for the study of media values, complicate this notion. Kai Hafez states, “The possible hypothesis that Islamic countries might not be interested in ‘truth’ and would rather propagate ‘Islam’ as the single truth cannot be verified completely because even a code that limits journalists’ freedom of expression to Islamic objectives and values, the Saudi Arabian code, demands that journalists present real facts.” In addition, Saudi journalists operate in an environment in which anti-religious talk is likely to be met with censorship.

Patterns of consumption also affect media values. People in the Arab world rely on newspapers, magazines, radio, television, and the Internet to differing degrees and to meet a variety of ends. For Rugh, the proportion of radio and television receivers to Arab populations relative to UNESCO minimum standards suggests that radio and television are the most widely consumed media. He estimates that television reaches well over 100 million people in the region, and this number has likely grown since 2004. By contrast, he supposes that Arab newspapers are designed more for elite-consumption on the basis of their low circulation. He states, "Only five Arab countries have daily newspapers which distribute over 60,000 copies and some have dailies only in the under-10,000 range. Only Egypt has dailies which distribute more than a half million copies." Estimating newspaper readership is complicated, however, by the fact that single newspapers can change hands many times in a day. Finally, the internet continues to be a fairly common denominator in Arab societies. A report by the Dubai School of Government and Bayt.com estimates that there are more than 125 million Internet users in the region, and that more than 53 million of them actively use social media. They caution, however, that while "the internet has wide-ranging benefits, these benefits do not reach large segments of societies in the Arab region. The digital divide remains a significant barrier for many people. In many parts of the Arab world levels of educational attainment, economic activity, standards of living and internet costs still determine a person's access to life-changing technology. Further, according to Leo Gher and Hussein Amin, the Internet and other modern telecommunication services may serve to counter the effects of private and public ownership and patronage of the press. They state, "Modern international telecommunications services now assist in the free flow of information, and neither inter-Arab conflicts nor differences among groups will affect the direct exchange of services provided by global cyberspace networks."

== Magazines ==
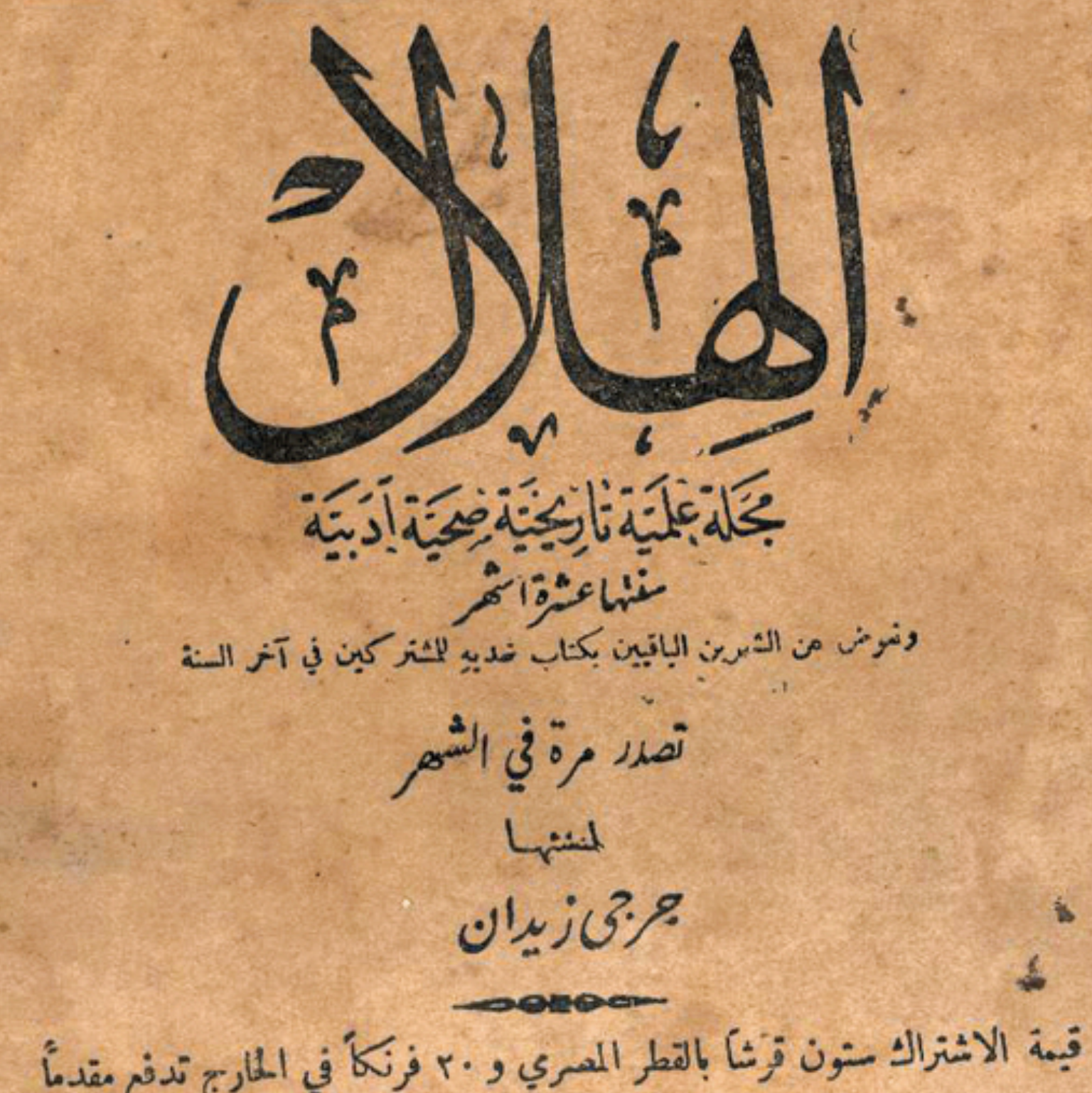
cover of Al-Hilal (magazine) among the oldest magazines dealing with arts in the Arab world.

In most Arabian countries, magazines cannot be published without a government-issued license. Magazines in the Arabian world, like many of the magazines in the Western world, are geared towards women. However, the number of magazines in the Arab world is significantly smaller than that of the Western world. The Arab world is not as advertisement driven as the Western world. Advertisers fuel the funding for most Western magazines to exist. Thus, a lesser emphasis on advertisement in the Arabian world plays into the low number of magazines.

== Radio ==
There are 40 private radio stations throughout the Middle East.

Arab radio broadcasting began in the 1920s, but only a few Arab countries had their own broadcasting stations before World War II. After 1945, most Arab states began to create their own radio broadcasting systems, although it was not until 1970, when Oman opened its radio transmissions, that every one of them had its own radio station.

Egypt has been a leader in radio broadcasting from the beginning. Broadcasting began in Egypt in the 1920s with private commercial radio. In 1947, however, the Egyptian government declared radio a government monopoly and began investing in its expansion. By the 1970s, Egyptian radio had fourteen different broadcast services with a total air time of 1,200 hours per week. Egypt is ranked third in the world among radio broadcasters. The programs were all government controlled, and much of the motivation for the government's investment in radio was due to the aspirations of President Gamal Abdel Nasser to be the recognized leader of the Arab world.

Egypt's "Voice of the Arabs" station, which targeted other Arab countries with a constant stream of news and political features and commentaries, became the most widely heard station in the region. Only after the June 1967 war, when it was revealed that this station had misinformed the public about what was happening, did it lose some credibility; nevertheless it retained a large listenership.

On the Arabian Peninsula, radio was slower to develop. In Saudi Arabia, radio broadcasts started in the Jidda-Mecca area in 1948, but they did not start in the central or eastern provinces until the 1960s. Neighboring Bahrain had radio by 1955, but Qatar, Abu Dhabi, and Oman did not start indigenous radio broadcasting until nearly a quarter century later.

== Television ==
Almost all television channels in the Arab world were government-owned and strictly controlled prior to the 1990s. In the 1990s the spread of satellite television began changing television in Arab countries. Often noted as a pioneer, Al Jazeera represents a shift towards a more professional approach to news and current affairs. Financed by the Qatar government and established in 1996, Al Jazeera was the first Arabic channel to deliver extensive live news coverage, going so far as to send reporters to "unthinkable" places like Israel. Breaking the mold in more ways than one, Al Jazeera's discussion programs raised subjects that had long been prohibited. However, in 2008, Egypt and Saudi Arabia called for a meeting to approve a charter to regulate satellite broadcasting. The Arab League Satellite Broadcasting Charter (2008) lays out principles for regulating satellite broadcasting in the Arab world.

Other satellite channels include Al Arabiya: established in 2003; based in Dubai; offshoot of MBC; Alhurra ("The Free One"), established in 2004 by the United States to counter-perceives biases in Arab news media; and Al Manar, owned by Hezbollah, Lebanese-based and highly controversial.

"Across the Middle East, new television stations, radio stations and websites are sprouting like incongruous electronic mushrooms in what was once a media desert. Meanwhile, newspapers are aggressively probing the red lines that have long contained them". Technology is playing a significant role in the changing Arab media. Pintak furthers, "Now, there are 263 free-to-air (FTA) satellite television stations in the region, according to Arab Advisors Group. That's double the figure as of just two years ago". Freedom of speech and money have little to do with why satellite television is sprouting up everywhere. Instead, "A desire for political influence is probably the biggest factor driving channel growth. But ego is a close second". The influence of the West is very apparent in Arab media, especially in television. Arab soap operas and the emerging popularity of reality TV are evidence of this notion.

"In the wake of controversy triggered by Super Star and Star Academy, some observers have hailed reality television as a harbinger of democracy in the Arab world." Star Academy in Lebanon is strikingly similar to American Idol mixed with The Real World. Star Academy began in 2003 in the Arab world. "Reality television entered Arab public discourse in the last five years at a time of significant turmoil in the region: escalating violence in Iraq, contested elections in Egypt, the struggle for women's political rights in Kuwait, political assassinations in Lebanon, and the protracted Arab–Israeli conflict. This geo-political crisis environment that currently frames Arab politics and Arab–Western relations is the backdrop to the controversy surrounding the social and political impact of Arab reality television, which assumes religious, cultural or moral manifestations."

== Cinema ==
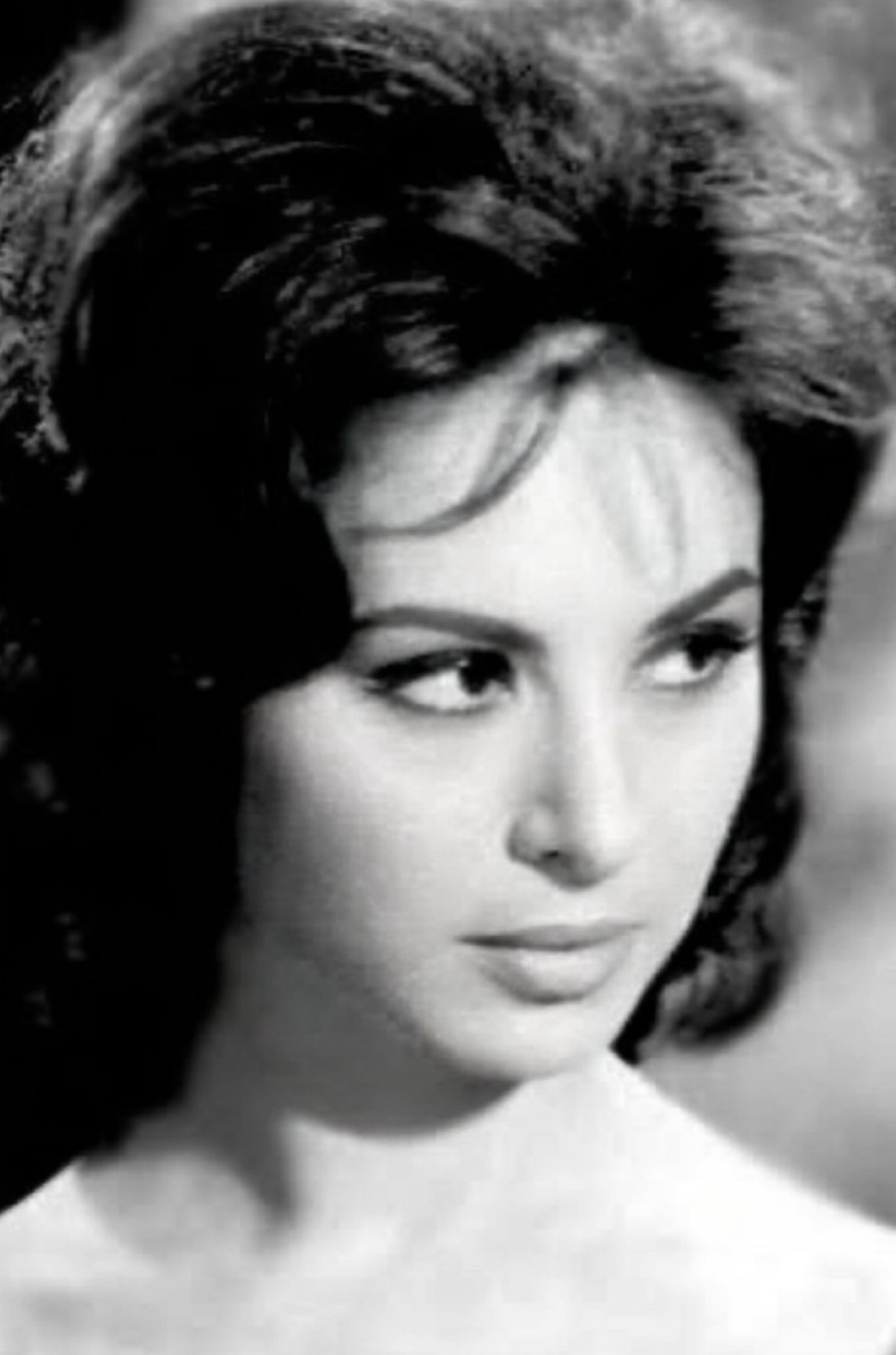
Faten Hamama (1931–2015), Egyptian film star

Most Arab countries did not produce films before independence, except for Egypt. In Sudan, Libya, Saudi Arabia, and the United Arab Emirates, production is even now confined to short films or television. Bahrain witnessed the production of its first and only full-length feature film in 1989. In Jordan, national production has barely exceeded half a dozen feature films. Iraq has produced approximately 100 films and Syria some 150. Lebanon, owing to an increased production during the 1950s and 1960s, has made some 180 feature films. Only Egypt has far exceeded these countries, with a production of more than 2,500 feature films (all meant for cinema, not television). As with most aspects of Arab media, censorship plays a large art of creating and distributing films. "In most Arab countries, film projects must first pass a state committee, which grants or denies permission to shoot. Once this permission is obtained, another official license, a so-called visa, is necessary in order to exploit the film commercially. This is normally approved by a committee of the Ministry of Information or a special censorship authority". The most significant taboo topics under state supervision are consistent with those of other forms of media: religion, sex, and politics.

== Internet ==
The Internet in the Arab world is powerful source of expression and information as it is in other places in the world. While some believe that it is the harbinger of freedom in media to the Middle East, others think that it is a new medium for censorship. Both are true. The Internet has created a new arena for discussion and the dissemination of information for the Arab world just as it has in the rest of the world. The youth in particular are accessing and utilizing the tools. People are encouraged and enabled to join in political discussion and critique in a manner that was not previously possible. Those same people are also discouraged and blocked from those debates as the differing regimes try to restrict access based on religious and state objections to certain material.

This was posted on a website operated by the Muslim Brotherhood:

The internet in the Arab world has a snowball effect; now that the snowball is rolling, it can no longer be stopped. Getting bigger and stronger, it is bound to crush down all obstacles. In addition, to the stress caused by the Arab bloggers, a new forum was opened for Arab activists; Facebook. Arab activists have been using Facebook in the utmost creative way to support the democracy movement in the region, a region that has one of the highest rates of repression in the world. Unlike other regions where oppressive countries (like China, Iran and Burma) represent the exception, oppression can be found everywhere in the Arab world. The number of Arab internet users interested in political affairs does not exceed a few thousands, mainly represented by internet activists and bloggers, out of 58 million internet users in the Arab world. As few as they are, they have succeeded in shedding some light on the corruption and repression of the Arab governments and dictatorships.

In the Arab world Internet access began in the early 1990s, with Tunisia reportedly being first in 1991. Kuwait joined in 1992, and in 1993, Iraq and the UAE came online. In 1994 Jordan joined the Internet, and Saudi Arabia and Syria followed in the late 1990s. Financial considerations and the lack of widespread availability of services are factors in the slower growth in the Arab world, but taking into consideration the popularity of internet cafes, the numbers online are much larger than the subscription numbers would reveal.

The use of the Internet in the Arab world is very political in the nature of posts and sites read and visited. The Internet has brought a medium to Arabs that allows for a freedom of expression not allowed or accepted before. For those who can get online, there are blogs to read and write and access to worldwide outlets of information once unobtainable. With this access, regimes have attempted to curtail what people are able to read, but the Internet is a medium not as easily manipulated as telling a newspaper what it can or cannot publish. The Internet can be reached via proxy server, mirror, and other means. Those who are thwarted with one method will find 12 more methods around the blocked site. Bloggers are often imprisoned for expressing their views. However, there is a worldwide audience witnessing this crackdown and watching as laws are created and recreated to attempt to control the vastness of the Internet.

== Sports ==
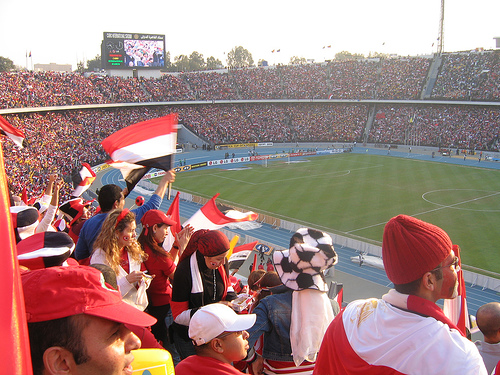
Crowd in Cairo Stadium

The Pan Arab Games are a regional multi-sport event held between nations from the Arab world. The first Games were held in 1953 in Alexandria, Egypt. Intended to be held every four years since, political turmoil as well as financial difficulties has made the event an unstable one. Women were first allowed to compete in 1985. By the 11th Pan Arab Games, the number of countries participating reached all 22 members of the Arab League, with roughly over 8,000 Arab athletes participating, it was considered the largest in the Games' history, with the Doha Games in 2011 expected to exceed that number.

== Cuisine ==
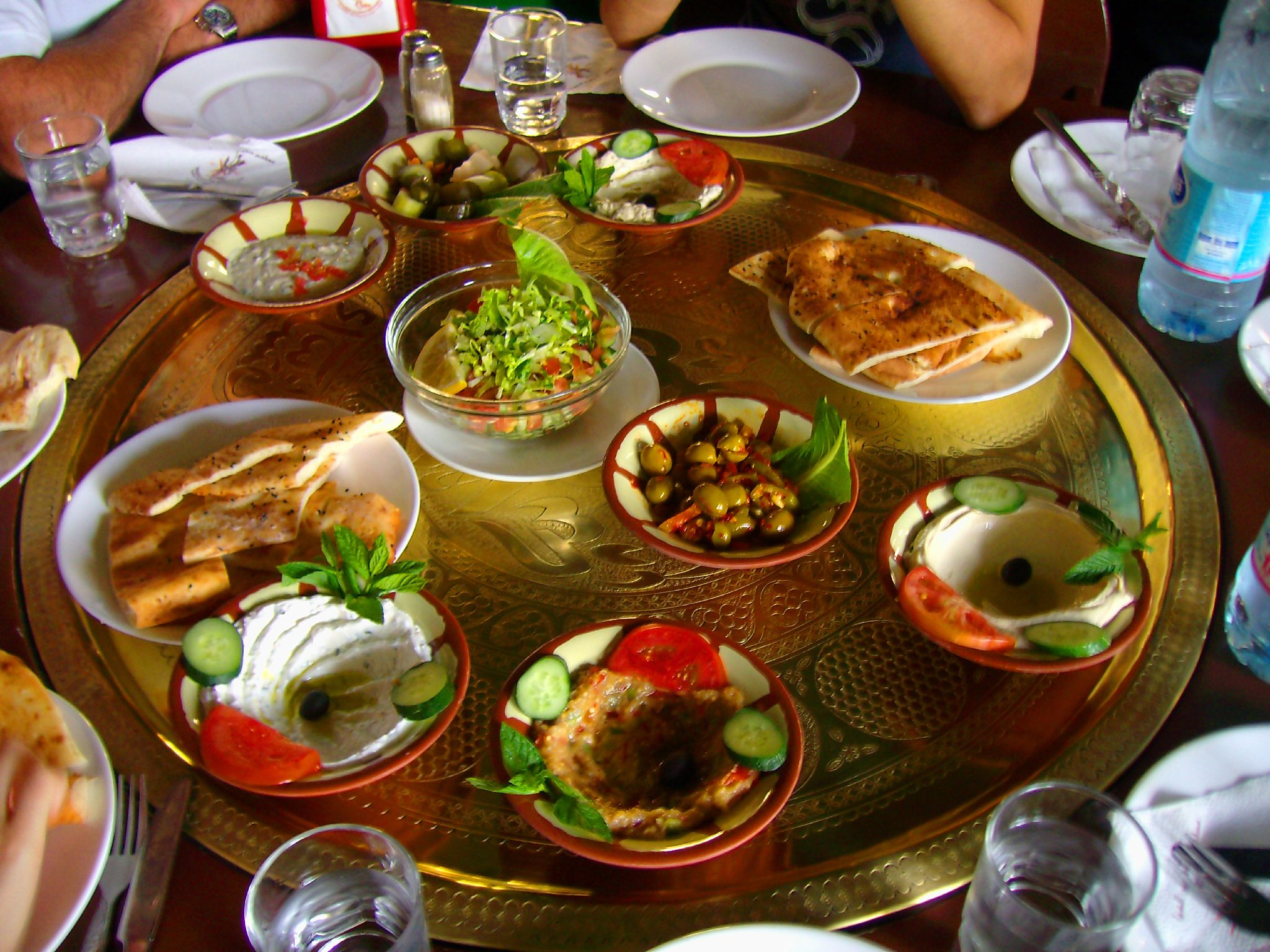
A selection of Jordanian mezze, appetizers or small dishes, in Petra, Jordan.

Originally, the Arabs of the Arabian Peninsula relied heavily on a diet of dates, wheat, barley, rice and meat, with little variety, with a heavy emphasis on yoghurt products, such as leben (لبن) (yoghurt without butterfat). Arabian cuisine today is the result of a combination of richly diverse cuisines, spanning the Arab world and incorporating Levantine, Egyptian, and others. It has also been influenced to a degree by the cuisines of India, Turkey, Berber, and others. In an average Arab household in Eastern Arabia, a visitor might expect a dinner consisting of a very large platter, shared commonly, with a vast mountain of rice, incorporating lamb or chicken, or both, as separate dishes, with various stewed vegetables, heavily spiced, sometimes with a tomato sauce. Most likely, there would be several other items on the side, less hearty. Tea would certainly accompany the meal, as it is almost constantly consumed. Coffee would be included as well.

Tea is a very important drink in the Arab world, it is usually served with breakfast, after lunch, and with dinner. For Arabs tea is a hospitality drink that is served to guests. It is also common for Arabs to drink tea with dates.

== Dress ==
=== Men ===
Arab dress for men ranges from the traditional flowing robes to blue jeans, T-shirts and business suits. The robes allow for maximum circulation of air around the body to help keep it cool, and the head dress provides protection from the sun. At times, Arabs mix the traditional garb with western clothes.

Thawb: In the Arabian Peninsula men usually wear their national dress that is called "thawb" or "thobe" but can be also called "Dishdasha" in Kuwait or "Kandoura" (UAE). Thawbs differ slightly from state to state within the Gulf, but the basic ones are white. This is the traditional attire that Arabs wear in formal occasions.

Headdress: The male headdress is known as a keffiyeh. In the Arabian Peninsula it is known as a guthra. It is usually worn with a black cord called an "agal", which keeps it on the wearer's head.

- The Qatari guthra is heavily starched and it is known for its "cobra" shape.
- The Saudi guthra is a square shaped cotton fabric. The traditional is white but the white and red (shemagh) is also very common in Saudi Arabia.
- The Emirati guthra is usually white and can be used as a wrapped turban or traditionally with the black agal.

Headdress pattern might be an indicator of which tribe, clan, or family the wearer comes from. However, this is not always the case. While in one village, a tribe or clan might have a unique headdress, in the next town over an unrelated tribe or clan might wear the same headdress.

- Checkered headdresses relate to type and government and participation in the Hajj, or a pilgrimage to Mecca.
- Red and white checkered headdress – Generally of Jordanian origin. Wearer has made Hajj and comes from a country with a Monarch.
- Black and white checkered headdress – The pattern is historically of Palestinian origin.
- Black and grey represent Presidential rule and completion of the Hajj.

=== Women ===
Adherence to traditional dress varies across Arab societies. Saudi Arabia is more traditional, while Egypt is less so. Traditional Arab dress features the full length body cover (abaya, jilbāb, or chador) and veil (hijab). Women are only required to wear abayas in Saudi Arabia, although that restriction has been eased since 2015. The veil is not as prevalent in most countries outside the Arabian peninsula.

The historical evolution, changes, and Arabic names of modes of dress over 1400 years in the Middle East, North Africa, and medieval Islamic Spain is described in the book Arab Dress: A Short History: From the Dawn of Islam to Modern Times.

== See also ==
- Arab Capital of Culture
