= Firqa =

Firqa (Arabic: فرقة, plural: فرق; firaq English: band), is a musical ensemble or orchestra in Middle Eastern music. While a similar ensemble called takht typically comprised between two and five musicians, the firqa generally numbers eight or more.

Since the firqa incorporates a substantial number of western instruments including the violin and piano accordion, in 1940s Egypt the popularity of this expanded ensemble caused it to displace the takht as the ensemble of choice. From there the firqa became popular throughout the Arabic world including Eastern and Northern Africa.

Beginning in the 1930s, the Egyptian singer Umm Kulthum was accompanied by a firqa.

== See also ==
- Takht (music)
