= Taht =

Taht may refer to:

- Thoth, an ancient Egyptian deity
- Taht, Bayburt, a village in Turkey
- Robert Täht, Estonian volleyball player
- Dave Täht, American network engineer

== See also ==
- Takht (disambiguation)
- Tahat (disambiguation)
