= Tahmilah =

Type of instrumental piece in Arabic music

A taḥmīlah (Arabic: التحميلة) is a type of instrumental piece in Arabic music. Often played by a takht ensemble, the tahmilah features the alternation between solo instruments and the full ensemble.

== See also ==
- Concerto grosso
