= Takht-e Qeysar =

Takht-e Qeysar تخت قيصر
- Village
- Location within Iran
- Coordinates: 32°03′33″N 48°52′03″E
- Country: Iran
- Province: Khuzestan
- County: Shushtar
- Bakhsh: Central
- Rural District: Shahid Modarres

Population (2006)
  - Total: 1,266
- Time zone: UTC+3:30 (IRST)
  - Summer (DST): UTC+4:30 (IRDT)

Takht-e Qeysar (Persian: تخت قيصر, also Romanized as Takht-e Qeyşar; also known as Takht-e Āzādī) is a village in Shahid Modarres Rural District, in the Central District of Shushtar County, Khuzestan Province, Iran. At the 2006 census, its population was 1,266, in 246 families.
