= Takht-e Sofla =

Takht-e Sofla تخت سفلي
- Village
- Location within Iran
- Coordinates: 37°08′58″N 47°12′37″E
- Country: Iran
- Province: East Azerbaijan
- County: Charuymaq
- Bakhsh: Shadian
- Rural District: Charuymaq-e Sharqi

Population (2006)
  - Total: 87
- Time zone: UTC+3:30 (IRST)
  - Summer (DST): UTC+4:30 (IRDT)

Takht-e Sofla (Persian: تخت سفلي, also Romanized as Takht-e Soflá; also known as Takht and Takht-e Pā’īn) is a village in Charuymaq-e Sharqi Rural District, Shadian District, Charuymaq County, East Azerbaijan Province, Iran. At the 2006 census, its population was 87, in 15 families.
