= Takhta (rural locality) =

Takhta (Russian: Тахта) is the name of several rural area localities in Russia:

- Takhta, Khabarovsk Krai, a selo in Ulchsky District of Khabarovsk Krai
- Takhta, Stavropol Krai, a selo in Takhtinsky Selsoviet of Ipatovsky District of Stavropol Krai
