= Takht (music) =

Small ensemble in Arabic music

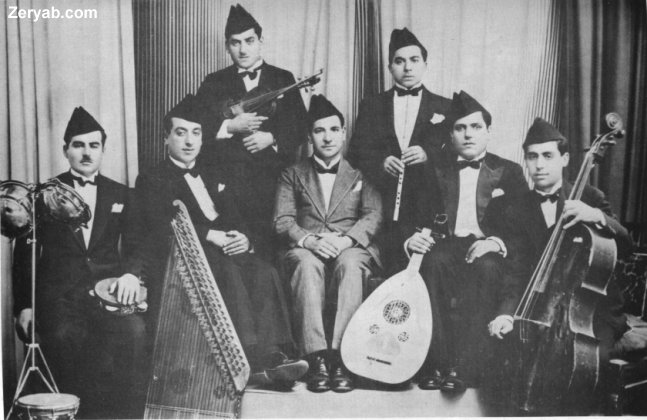

Takht (alternatively spelled Takhat) is the representative musical ensemble, the orchestra, of Middle Eastern music. In Egypt, Syria, Lebanon, Palestine, and Jordan, the ensemble consists of the oud, the qanun, the kamanjah (or now alternatively violin), the ney, the riq, and the darabukkah .

The melody instruments may play heterophonically in octaves or perform solos. Instrumental forms include bashraf, sama'i, tahmilah, and dulab. The ensemble may be joined by a male or female vocalist and a group of four to six singers who provide the refrain sections. Vocal genres performed include dawr, muwashshah, layali, ma'luf, qasidah, and mawwal.

While the takht typically comprises between two and five musicians, a similar, but larger ensemble (numbering eight or more) is called a firqa in Arabic.
